= Eure (river) =

River in France

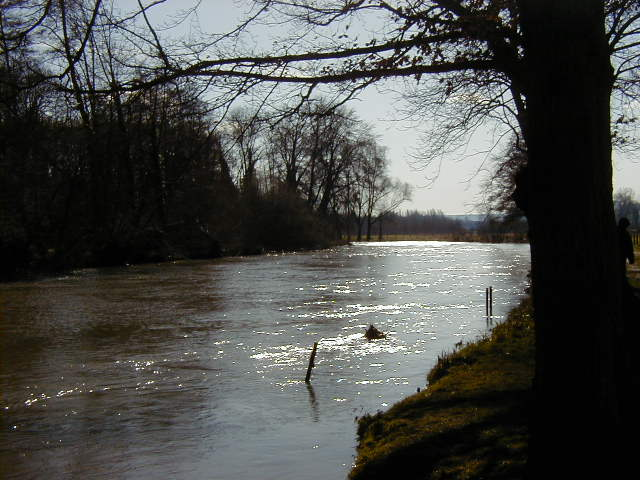
- The Eure

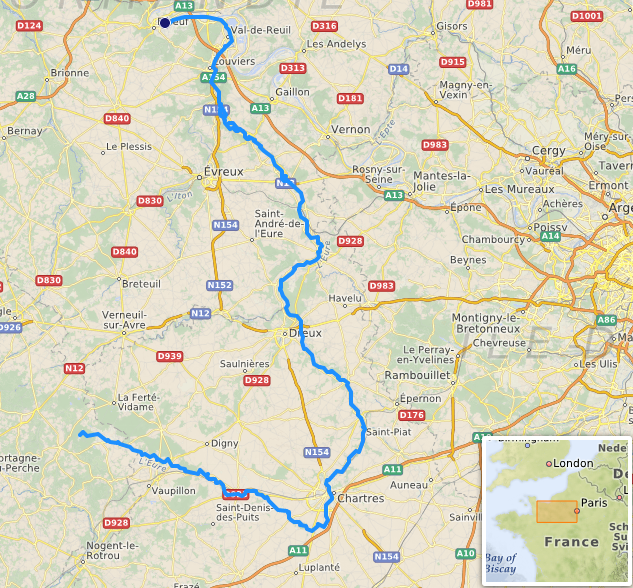

Location
- Country: France

Physical characteristics
- Source
  - location: Normandy
  - elevation: 240 m (790 ft)
- Mouth
  - location: Seine
  - coordinates: 49°17′42″N 1°02′27″E
- Length: 229 km (142 mi)
- Basin size: 5,935 square kilometres (2,292 mi^{2})
- Discharge
  - average: 26 m^{3}/s (920 cu ft/s)

Basin features
- Progression: Seine→ English Channel

The Eure (English: /ɜːr/ ur; French pronunciation: [œʁ]) is a river between Normandy and Centre-Val de Loire in north-western France, left tributary of the Seine. It is 229 km (142 mi) long. It rises at Longny les Villages in the Orne department and joins the Seine near Pont-de-l'Arche. Two departments are named after the Eure, namely Eure and Eure-et-Loir.

Places along the river:

- Orne (61): Longny les Villages, Les Menus.
- Eure-et-Loir (28): Courville-sur-Eure, Saint-Georges-sur-Eure, Fontenay-sur-Eure, Chartres, Saint-Prest, Maintenon, Nogent-le-Roi, Mézières-en-Drouais, Cherisy, Anet.
- Eure (27): Évreux, Ivry-la-Bataille, Garennes-sur-Eure, Bueil, Merey, Pacy-sur-Eure, Ménilles, Chambray, Croisy-sur-Eure, Autheuil-Authouillet, Acquigny, Louviers, Le Vaudreuil, Val de Reuil, Pont-de-l'Arche, Martot.

Its main tributaries are the Avre, the Iton and the Blaise from the left and the Voise, the Drouette and the Vesgre from the right.
