= René Ronsil =

French naturalist (1908–1956)

René Henri Ronsil (18 April 1908, Ménilles – 17 October 1956, Louveciennes) was a French naturalist who specialised in ornithology especially the bibliography of bird literature. He was also an operatic tenor.
