= Hécourt =

Hécourt may refer to the following places in France:

- Hécourt, Eure, a commune in the Eure department
- Hécourt, Oise, a commune in the Oise department
