= Fontaine-sous-Jouy =

- Commune
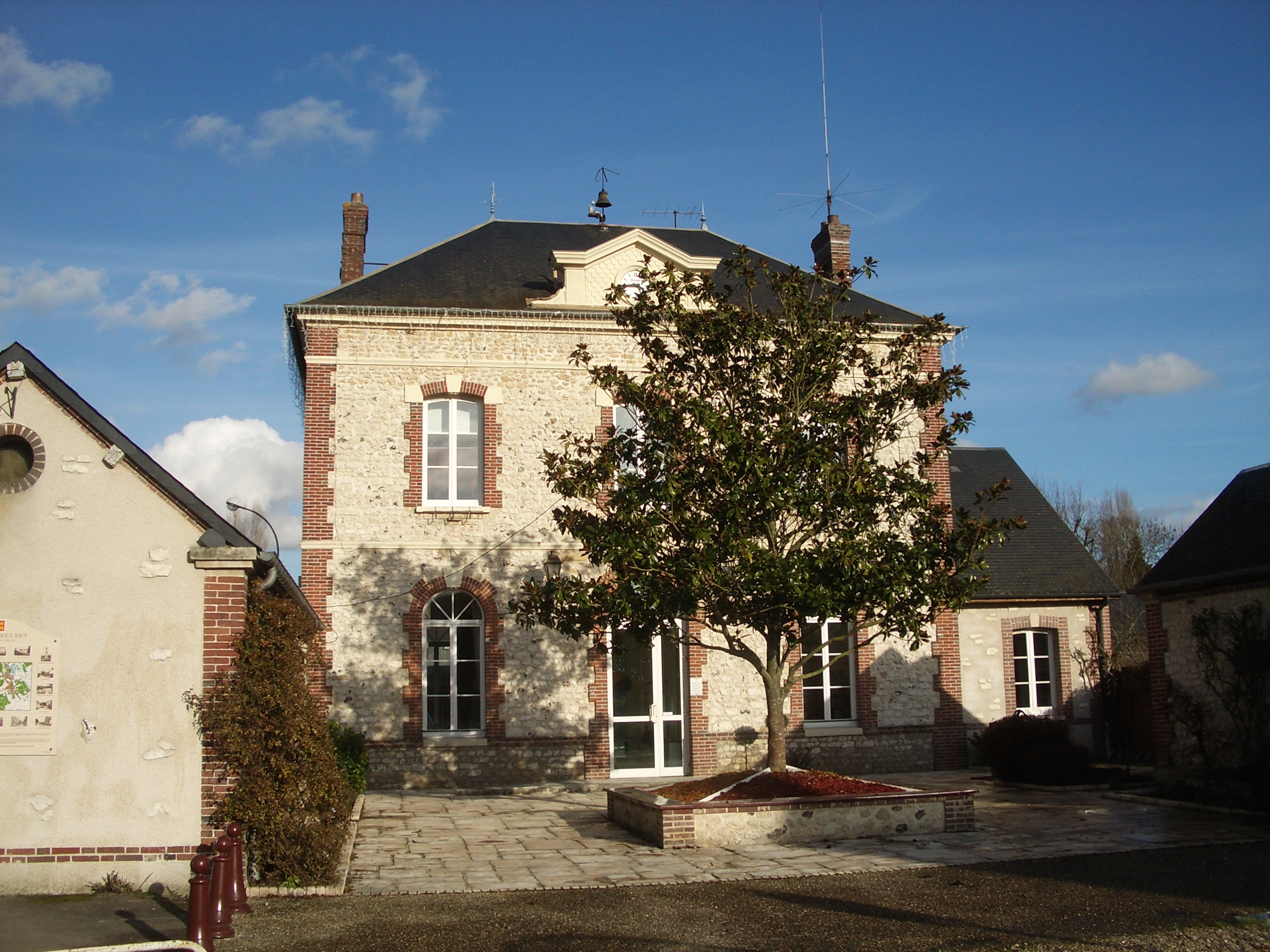
- Town hall
- Location of Fontaine-sous-Jouy
- Location within France Location within Normandy
- Coordinates: 49°04′03″N 1°17′34″E
- Country: France
- Region: Normandy
- Department: Eure
- Arrondissement: Les Andelys
- Canton: Pacy-sur-Eure
- Intercommunality: Évreux Portes de Normandie

Government
  - Mayor (2020–2026): Raphaël Norblin
- Area^{1}: 7.33 km^{2} (2.83 sq mi)
- Elevation: 140 m (460 ft)
- Highest elevation: 134 m (440 ft)
- Lowest elevation: 29 m (95 ft)
- Population (2023): 849
  - Density: 116/km^{2} (300/sq mi)
- Time zone: UTC+01:00 (CET)
  - Summer (DST): UTC+02:00 (CEST)
- INSEE/Postal code: 27254 /27120
- ^{1} French Land Register data, which excludes lakes, ponds, glaciers > 1 km^{2} (0.386 sq mi or 247 acres) and river estuaries.

Fontaine-sous-Jouy (French pronunciation: [fɔ̃tɛn su ʒwi], literally Fontaine under Jouy) is a commune in the Eure department in the Normandy region in northern France.

== Population ==
Historical population
Year	Pop.	±% p.a.
1968	394	—
1975	438	+1.52%
1982	478	+1.26%
1990	618	+3.26%
1999	749	+2.16%
2007	829	+1.28%
2012	801	−0.68%
2017	873	+1.74%
2023	849	−0.46%
Source: INSEE

== See also ==
- Communes of the Eure department
