= Villegats, Eure =

Villegats
- Commune
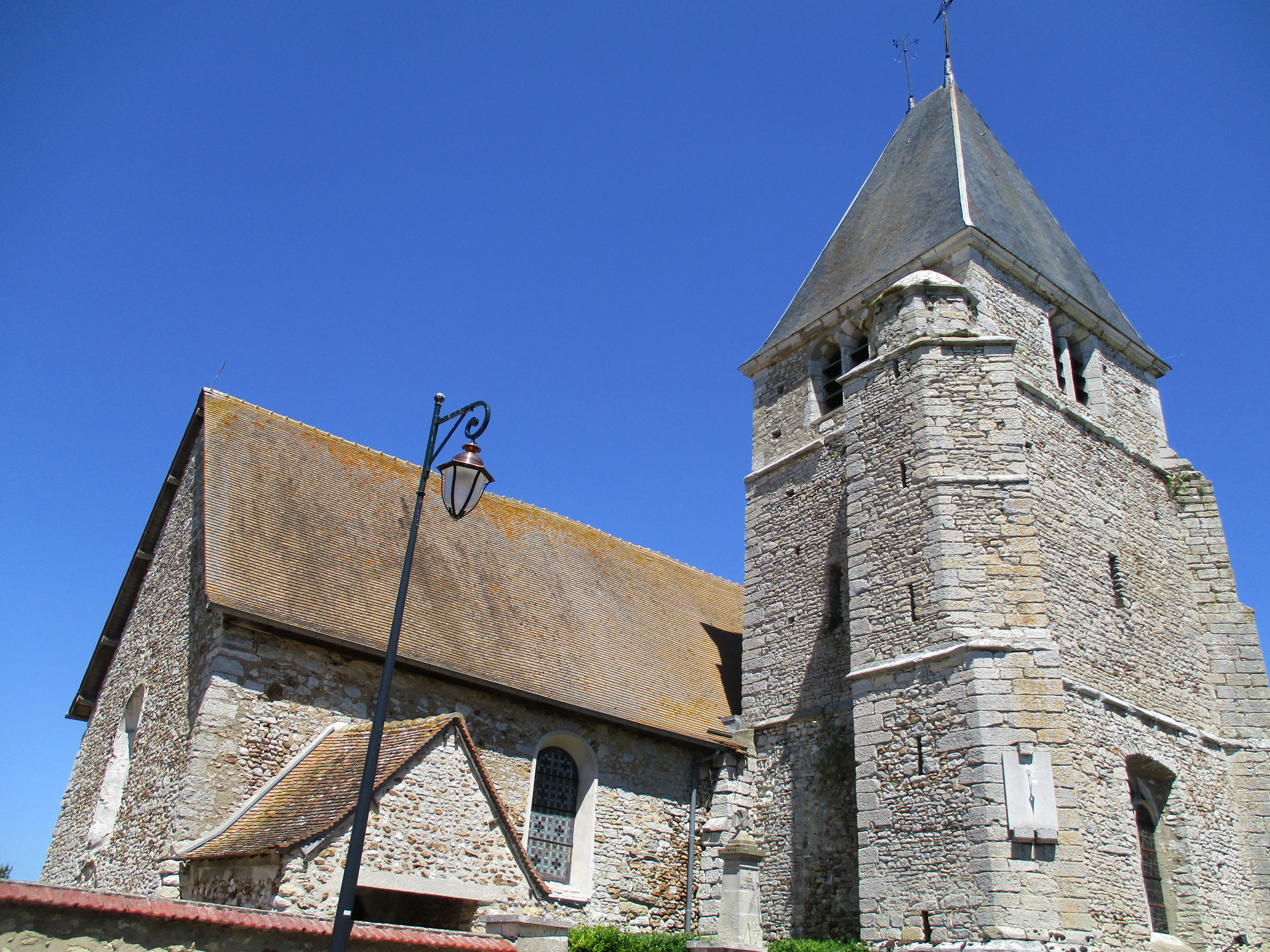
- The church in Villegats
- Location of Villegats
- Location within France Location within Normandy
- Coordinates: 49°00′02″N 1°27′47″E
- Country: France
- Region: Normandy
- Department: Eure
- Arrondissement: Les Andelys
- Canton: Pacy-sur-Eure
- Intercommunality: Seine Normandie Agglomération

Government
  - Mayor (2020–2026): Lysianne Élie-Parquet
- Area^{1}: 3.58 km^{2} (1.38 sq mi)
- Elevation: 144 m (472 ft)
- Highest elevation: 157 m (515 ft)
- Lowest elevation: 86 m (282 ft)
- Population (2023): 360
  - Density: 100/km^{2} (260/sq mi)
- Time zone: UTC+01:00 (CET)
  - Summer (DST): UTC+02:00 (CEST)
- INSEE/Postal code: 27689 /27120
- ^{1} French Land Register data, which excludes lakes, ponds, glaciers > 1 km^{2} (0.386 sq mi or 247 acres) and river estuaries.

Villegats (French pronunciation: [vilɡa]) is a commune in the Eure department in Normandy in northern France.

== Population ==
Historical population
Year	Pop.	±% p.a.
1968	151	—
1975	167	+1.45%
1982	135	−2.99%
1990	261	+8.59%
1999	297	+1.45%
2007	333	+1.44%
2012	341	+0.48%
2017	350	+0.52%
2023	360	+0.47%
Source: INSEE

== See also ==
- Communes of the Eure department
