= Houlbec-Cocherel =

- Commune
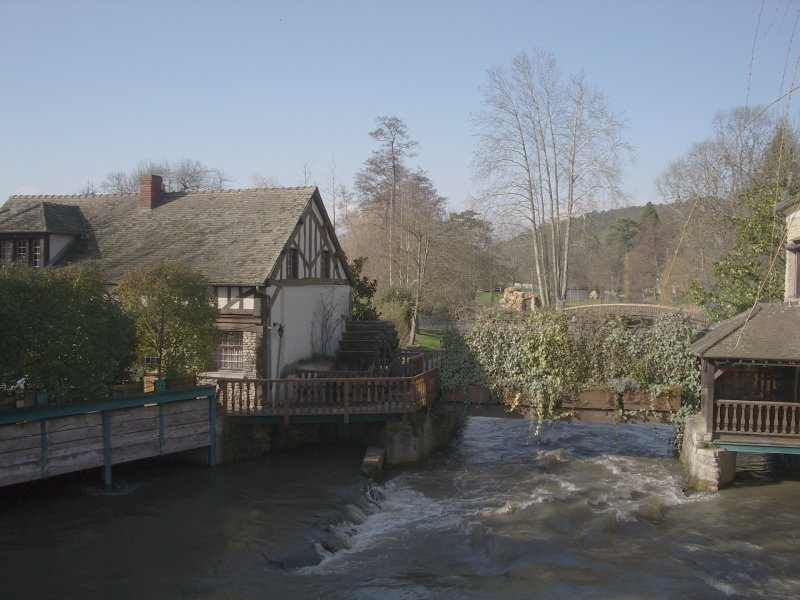
- Mill of Cocherel

- Coat of arms
- Location of Houlbec-Cocherel
- Location within France Location within Normandy
- Coordinates: 49°04′29″N 1°21′53″E
- Country: France
- Region: Normandy
- Department: Eure
- Arrondissement: Les Andelys
- Canton: Pacy-sur-Eure
- Intercommunality: Seine Normandie Agglomération

Government
  - Mayor (2023–2026): Serge Fontaine
- Area^{1}: 11.64 km^{2} (4.49 sq mi)
- Elevation: 142 m (466 ft)
- Highest elevation: 143 m (469 ft)
- Lowest elevation: 35 m (115 ft)
- Population (2023): 1,280
  - Density: 110/km^{2} (285/sq mi)
- Time zone: UTC+01:00 (CET)
  - Summer (DST): UTC+02:00 (CEST)
- INSEE/Postal code: 27343 /27120
- ^{1} French Land Register data, which excludes lakes, ponds, glaciers > 1 km^{2} (0.386 sq mi or 247 acres) and river estuaries.

Houlbec-Cocherel (French pronunciation: [ulbɛk kɔʃʁɛl]) is a commune in the Eure department in Normandy in northern France. The town is located 80 km away from the capital and most populous city in France, Paris.

== History ==
The Battle of Cocherel, an event of the Hundred Years' War that occurred on 16 May 1364.

== Population ==
Historical population
Year	Pop.	±% p.a.
1968	407	—
1975	460	+1.76%
1982	859	+9.33%
1990	1,127	+3.45%
1999	1,188	+0.59%
2007	1,344	+1.55%
2012	1,352	+0.12%
2017	1,305	−0.71%
2023	1,280	−0.32%
Source: INSEE

== See also ==
- Communes of the Eure department
