= La Heunière =

- Commune
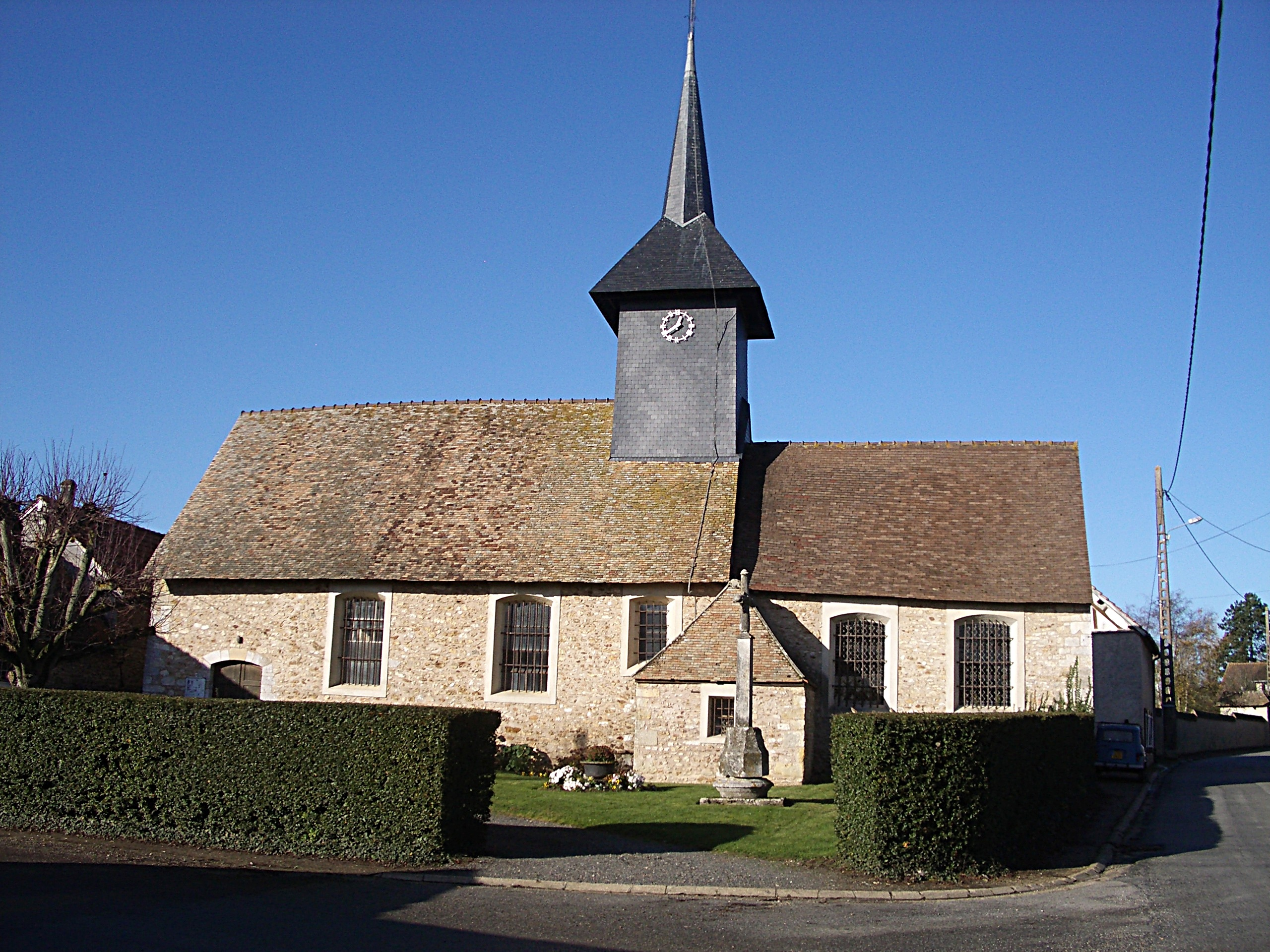
- The church of Saint-Jean-Baptiste in La Heunière

- Coat of arms
- Location of La Heunière
- Location within France Location within Normandy
- Coordinates: 49°03′44″N 1°24′54″E
- Country: France
- Region: Normandy
- Department: Eure
- Arrondissement: Les Andelys
- Canton: Pacy-sur-Eure
- Intercommunality: Seine Normandie Agglomération

Government
  - Mayor (2020–2026): Jérôme Foucher
- Area^{1}: 3.07 km^{2} (1.19 sq mi)
- Elevation: 142 m (466 ft)
- Highest elevation: 143 m (469 ft)
- Lowest elevation: 122 m (400 ft)
- Population (2023): 450
  - Density: 150/km^{2} (380/sq mi)
- Time zone: UTC+01:00 (CET)
  - Summer (DST): UTC+02:00 (CEST)
- INSEE/Postal code: 27336 /27950
- ^{1} French Land Register data, which excludes lakes, ponds, glaciers > 1 km^{2} (0.386 sq mi or 247 acres) and river estuaries.

La Heunière (French pronunciation: [la œnjɛʁ]) is a commune in the Eure department in northern France.

== Population ==
Historical population
Year	Pop.	±% p.a.
1968	126	—
1975	135	+0.99%
1982	195	+5.39%
1990	234	+2.31%
1999	241	+0.33%
2007	252	+0.56%
2012	263	+0.86%
2017	367	+6.89%
2023	450	+3.46%
Source: INSEE

== See also ==
- Communes of the Eure department
