= Villiers-en-Désœuvre =

- Commune
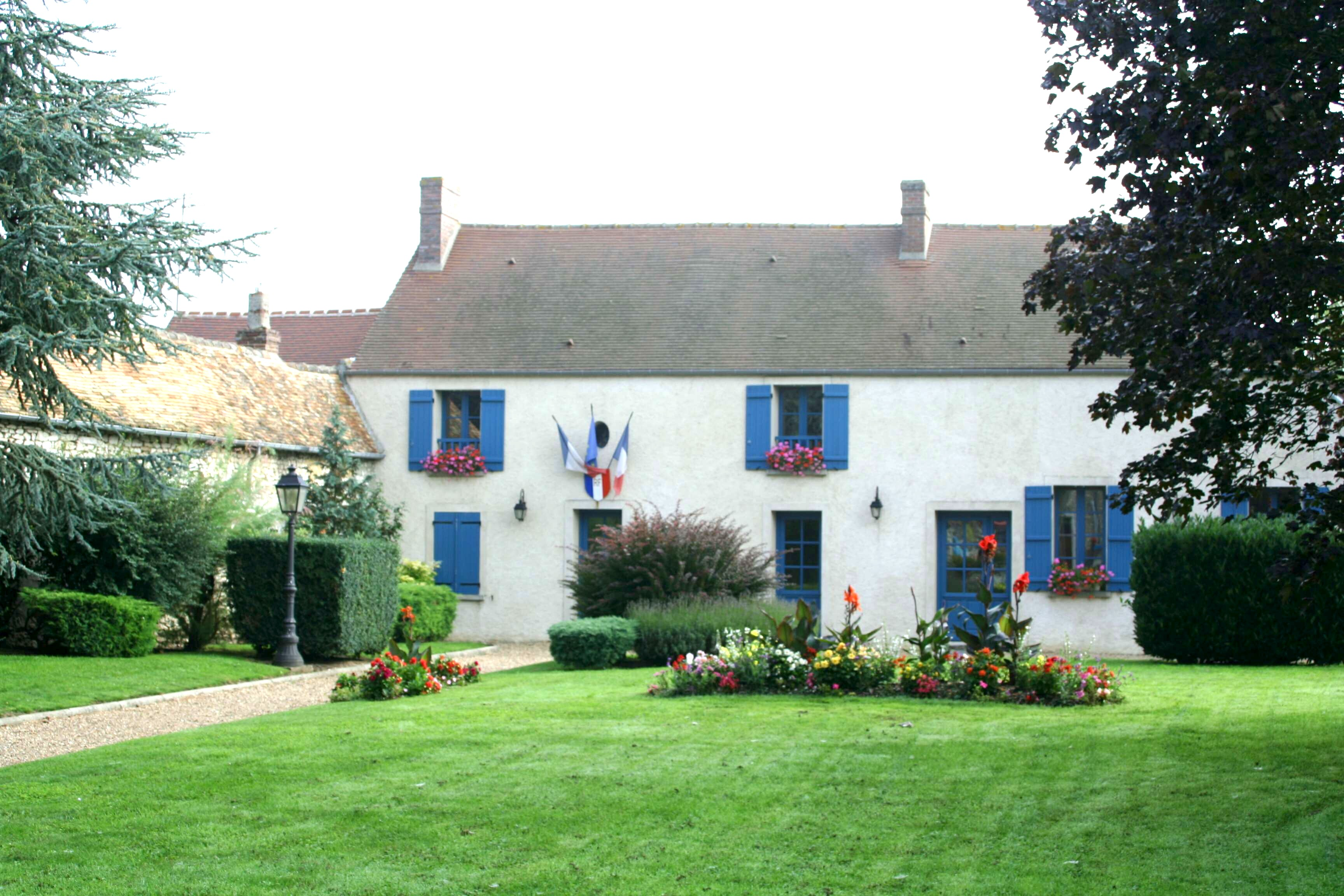
- Town hall
- Location of Villiers-en-Désœuvre
- Location within France Location within Normandy
- Coordinates: 48°56′54″N 1°29′19″E
- Country: France
- Region: Normandy
- Department: Eure
- Arrondissement: Les Andelys
- Canton: Pacy-sur-Eure
- Intercommunality: Seine Normandie Agglomération

Government
  - Mayor (2020–2026): Christian Bidot
- Area^{1}: 14.65 km^{2} (5.66 sq mi)
- Elevation: 139 m (456 ft)
- Highest elevation: 167 m (548 ft)
- Lowest elevation: 82 m (269 ft)
- Population (2023): 853
  - Density: 58.2/km^{2} (151/sq mi)
- Time zone: UTC+01:00 (CET)
  - Summer (DST): UTC+02:00 (CEST)
- INSEE/Postal code: 27696 /27640
- ^{1} French Land Register data, which excludes lakes, ponds, glaciers > 1 km^{2} (0.386 sq mi or 247 acres) and river estuaries.

Villiers-en-Désœuvre (French pronunciation: [vilje ɑ̃ dezœvʁ]) is a commune in the Eure department in Normandy in northern France.

== Population ==
Historical population
Year	Pop.	±% p.a.
1968	461	—
1975	439	−0.70%
1982	552	+3.33%
1990	687	+2.77%
1999	802	+1.73%
2007	916	+1.68%
2012	870	−1.03%
2017	937	+1.49%
2023	853	−1.55%
Source: INSEE

== See also ==
- Communes of the Eure department
