= Neuilly, Eure =

Neuilly
- Commune
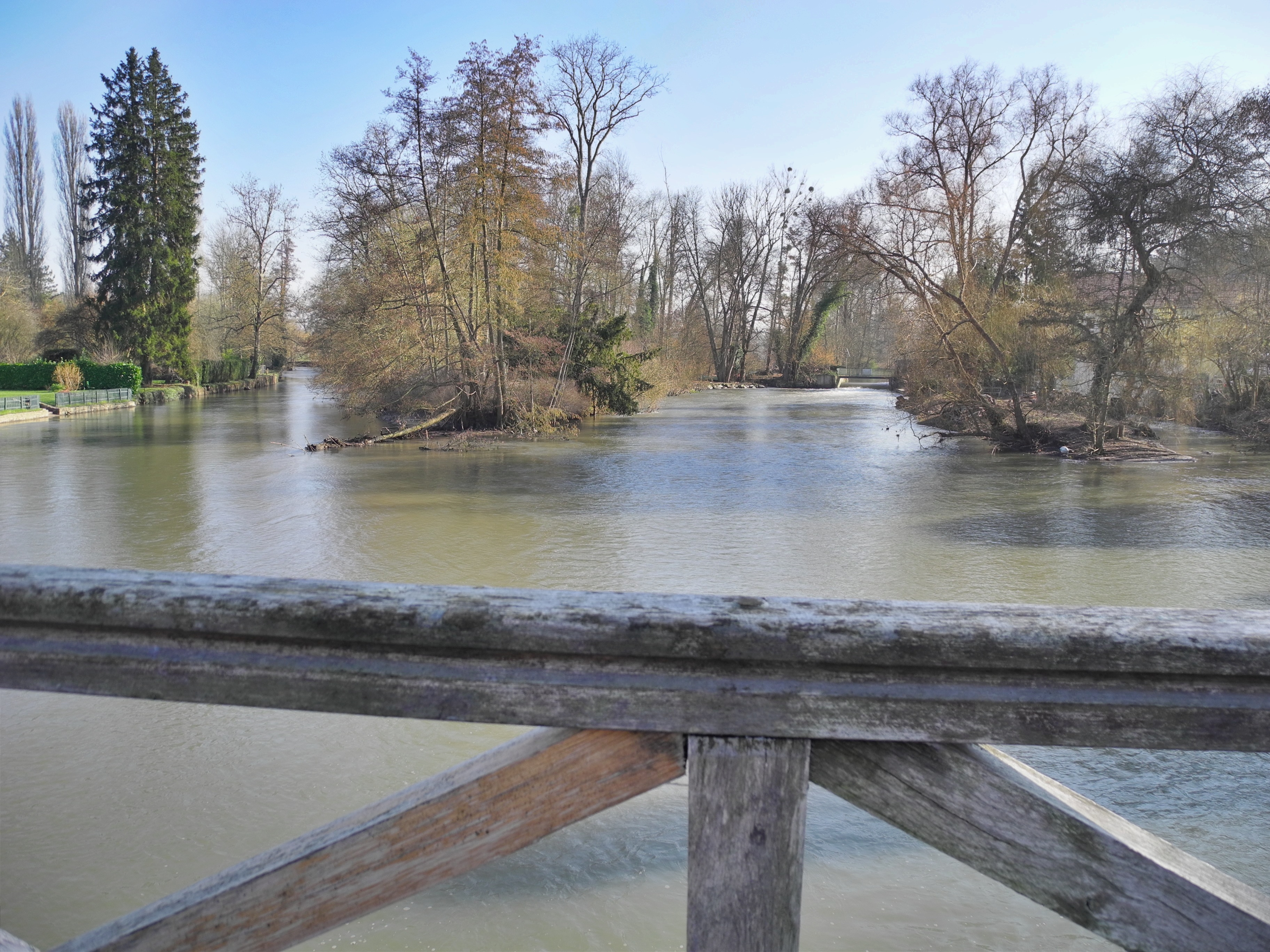
- The Eure river in Neuilly

- Coat of arms
- Location of Neuilly
- Location within France Location within Normandy
- Coordinates: 48°55′59″N 1°25′14″E
- Country: France
- Region: Normandy
- Department: Eure
- Arrondissement: Les Andelys
- Canton: Pacy-sur-Eure
- Intercommunality: Seine Normandie Agglomération

Government
  - Mayor (2020–2026): Pascal Gimonet
- Area^{1}: 4.71 km^{2} (1.82 sq mi)
- Elevation: 50 m (160 ft)
- Highest elevation: 137 m (449 ft)
- Lowest elevation: 47 m (154 ft)
- Population (2023): 168
  - Density: 35.7/km^{2} (92.4/sq mi)
- Time zone: UTC+01:00 (CET)
  - Summer (DST): UTC+02:00 (CEST)
- INSEE/Postal code: 27429 /27730
- ^{1} French Land Register data, which excludes lakes, ponds, glaciers > 1 km^{2} (0.386 sq mi or 247 acres) and river estuaries.

Neuilly (French pronunciation: [nœji]) is a commune in the Eure department in Normandy in northern France.

== Population ==
Historical population
Year	Pop.	±% p.a.
1968	120	—
1975	117	−0.36%
1982	107	−1.27%
1990	118	+1.23%
1999	120	+0.19%
2007	137	+1.67%
2012	152	+2.10%
2017	178	+3.21%
2023	168	−0.96%
Source: INSEE

== See also ==
- Communes of the Eure department
