= Gadencourt =

- Commune
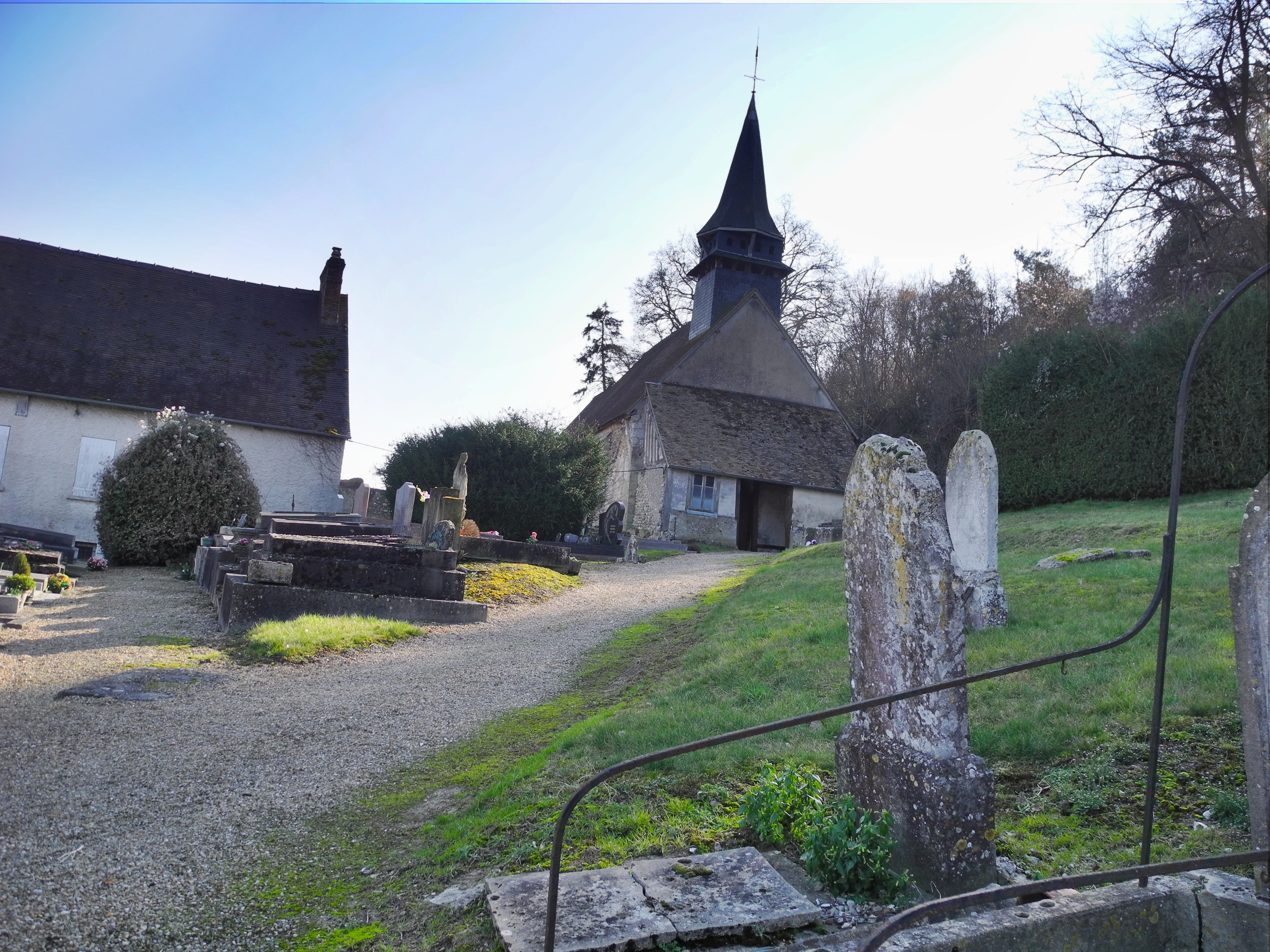
- The church in Gadencourt
- Location of Gadencourt
- Location within France Location within Normandy
- Coordinates: 48°59′00″N 1°24′12″E
- Country: France
- Region: Normandy
- Department: Eure
- Arrondissement: Les Andelys
- Canton: Pacy-sur-Eure
- Intercommunality: Seine Normandie Agglomération

Government
  - Mayor (2020–2026): Xavier Pucheta
- Area^{1}: 3.89 km^{2} (1.50 sq mi)
- Elevation: 45 m (148 ft)
- Highest elevation: 120 m (390 ft)
- Lowest elevation: 42 m (138 ft)
- Population (2023): 364
  - Density: 93.6/km^{2} (242/sq mi)
- Time zone: UTC+01:00 (CET)
  - Summer (DST): UTC+02:00 (CEST)
- INSEE/Postal code: 27273 /27120
- ^{1} French Land Register data, which excludes lakes, ponds, glaciers > 1 km^{2} (0.386 sq mi or 247 acres) and river estuaries.

Gadencourt (French pronunciation: [ɡadɑ̃kuʁ]) is a commune in the Eure department in northern France.

== Population ==
Historical population
Year	Pop.	±% p.a.
1968	161	—
1975	181	+1.69%
1982	144	−3.21%
1990	280	+8.67%
1999	343	+2.28%
2007	394	+1.75%
2012	387	−0.36%
2017	382	−0.26%
2023	364	−0.80%
Source: INSEE

== See also ==
- Communes of the Eure department
