= Seine Normandie Agglomération =

- Communauté d'agglomération
- Interactive map of Seine Normandie Agglomération
- Coordinates: 49°10′N 01°25′E
- Country: France
- Region: Normandy
- Department: Eure
- No. of communes: {{{nbcomm}}}
- Established: 2017
- Area: 696.6 km^{2} (269.0 sq mi)
- Population (2019): 82,408
  - Density: 118.3/km^{2} (306.4/sq mi)
- Website: www.sna27.fr

Seine Normandie Agglomération is the communauté d'agglomération, an intercommunal structure, centred on the town of Vernon. It is located in the Eure department, in the Normandy region, northwestern France. Created in 2017, its seat is in Vernon. Its area is 660.1 km^{2}. Its population was 82,408 in 2019, of which 23,727 in Vernon proper.

== Composition ==
The communauté d'agglomération consists of the following 61 communes:

1. Aigleville
2. Les Andelys
3. Bois-Jérôme-Saint-Ouen
4. Boisset-les-Prévanches
5. La Boissière
6. Bouafles
7. Breuilpont
8. Bueil
9. Caillouet-Orgeville
10. Chaignes
11. Chambray
12. La Chapelle-Longueville
13. Le Cormier
14. Croisy-sur-Eure
15. Cuverville
16. Daubeuf-près-Vatteville
17. Douains
18. Écouis
19. Fains
20. Frenelles-en-Vexin
21. Gadencourt
22. Gasny
23. Giverny
24. Guiseniers
25. Hardencourt-Cocherel
26. Harquency
27. Hécourt
28. Hennezis
29. Heubécourt-Haricourt
30. La Heunière
31. Heuqueville
32. Houlbec-Cocherel
33. Ménilles
34. Mercey
35. Merey
36. Mesnil-Verclives
37. Mézières-en-Vexin
38. Muids
39. Neuilly
40. Notre-Dame-de-l'Isle
41. Pacy-sur-Eure
42. Le Plessis-Hébert
43. Port-Mort
44. Pressagny-l'Orgueilleux
45. La Roquette
46. Rouvray
47. Sainte-Colombe-près-Vernon
48. Sainte-Geneviève-lès-Gasny
49. Saint-Marcel
50. Saint-Vincent-des-Bois
51. Suzay
52. Le Thuit
53. Tilly
54. Vatteville
55. Vaux-sur-Eure
56. Vernon
57. Vexin-sur-Epte
58. Vézillon
59. Villegats
60. Villez-sous-Bailleul
61. Villiers-en-Désœuvre
