= Villez-sous-Bailleul =

- Commune
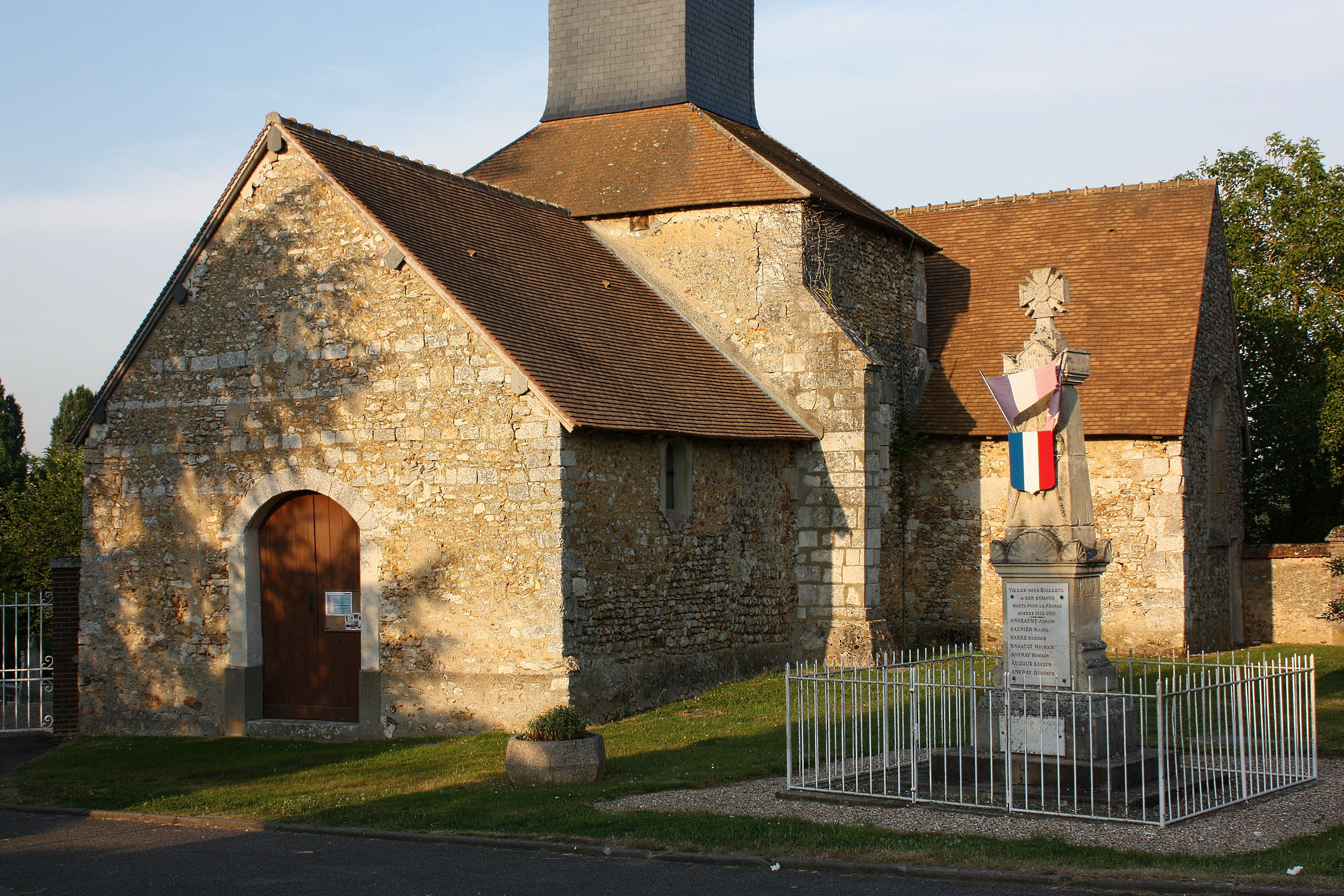
- The church in Villez-sous-Bailleul
- Location of Villez-sous-Bailleul
- Location within France Location within Normandy
- Coordinates: 49°06′43″N 1°22′36″E
- Country: France
- Region: Normandy
- Department: Eure
- Arrondissement: Les Andelys
- Canton: Pacy-sur-Eure
- Intercommunality: Seine Normandie Agglomération

Government
  - Mayor (2020–2026): Marie-Odile Andrieu
- Area^{1}: 4.36 km^{2} (1.68 sq mi)
- Elevation: 112 m (367 ft)
- Highest elevation: 136 m (446 ft)
- Lowest elevation: 58 m (190 ft)
- Population (2023): 312
  - Density: 71.6/km^{2} (185/sq mi)
- Time zone: UTC+01:00 (CET)
  - Summer (DST): UTC+02:00 (CEST)
- INSEE/Postal code: 27694 /27950
- ^{1} French Land Register data, which excludes lakes, ponds, glaciers > 1 km^{2} (0.386 sq mi or 247 acres) and river estuaries.

Villez-sous-Bailleul (French pronunciation: [vile su bajœl]) is a commune in the Eure department in Normandy in northern France.

== Population ==
Historical population
Year	Pop.	±% p.a.
1968	204	—
1975	225	+1.41%
1982	225	+0.00%
1990	248	+1.22%
1999	275	+1.15%
2007	310	+1.51%
2012	314	+0.26%
2017	312	−0.13%
2023	312	+0.00%
Source: INSEE

== See also ==
- Communes of the Eure department
