= Le Plessis-Hébert =

- Commune
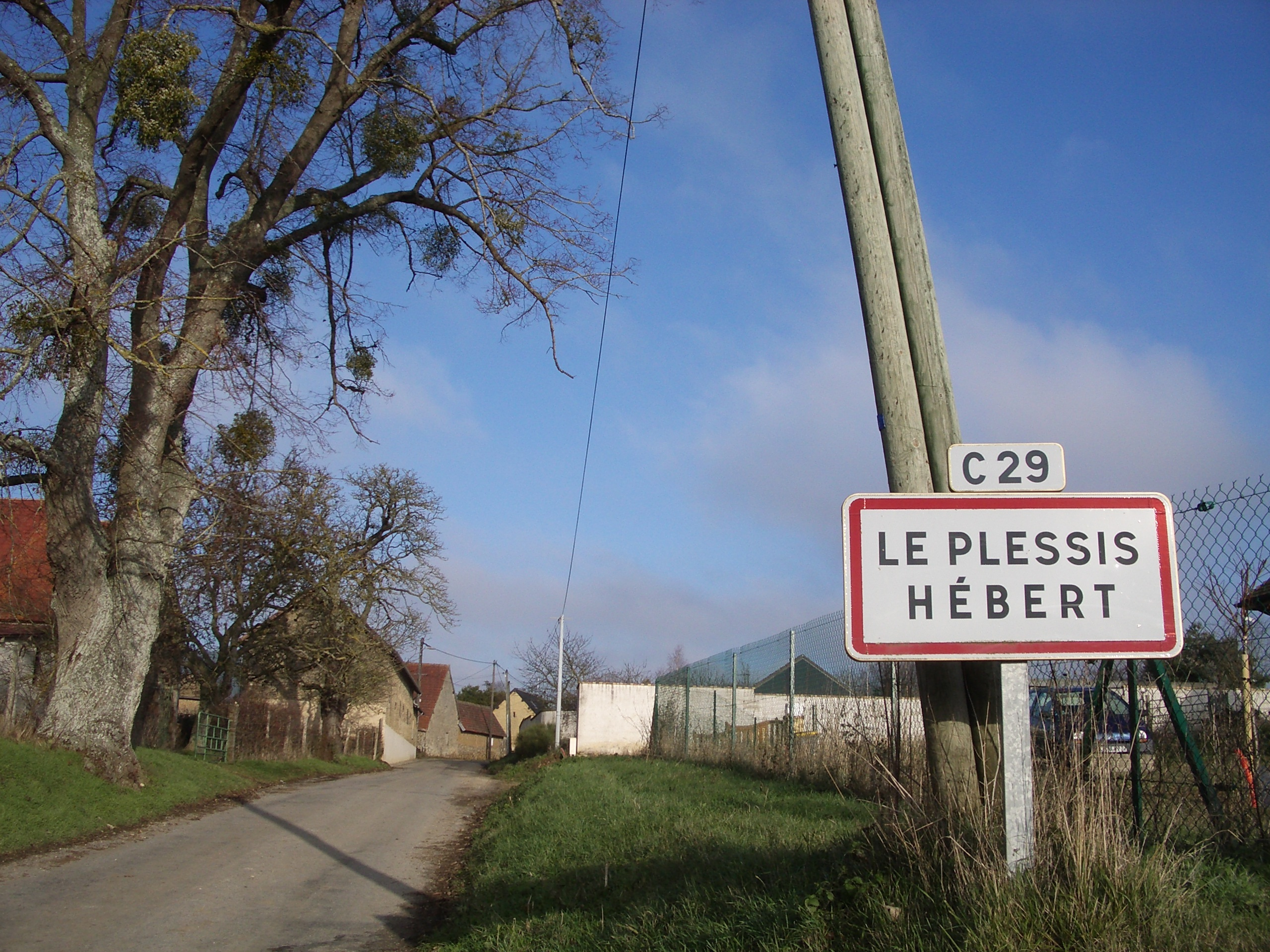
- One of the roads into Le Plessis-Hébert

- Coat of arms
- Location of Le Plessis-Hébert
- Location within France Location within Normandy
- Coordinates: 48°59′24″N 1°21′09″E
- Country: France
- Region: Normandy
- Department: Eure
- Arrondissement: Les Andelys
- Canton: Pacy-sur-Eure
- Intercommunality: Seine Normandie Agglomération

Government
  - Mayor (2021–2026): Laurence Mention
- Area^{1}: 11.73 km^{2} (4.53 sq mi)
- Elevation: 129 m (423 ft)
- Highest elevation: 133 m (436 ft)
- Lowest elevation: 55 m (180 ft)
- Population (2023): 404
  - Density: 34.4/km^{2} (89.2/sq mi)
- Time zone: UTC+01:00 (CET)
  - Summer (DST): UTC+02:00 (CEST)
- INSEE/Postal code: 27465 /27120
- ^{1} French Land Register data, which excludes lakes, ponds, glaciers > 1 km^{2} (0.386 sq mi or 247 acres) and river estuaries.

Le Plessis-Hébert (French pronunciation: [lə plɛsi ebɛʁ]) is a commune in the Eure department in Normandy in northern France.

== Population ==
Historical population
Year	Pop.	±% p.a.
1968	201	—
1975	192	−0.65%
1982	258	+4.31%
1990	318	+2.65%
1999	345	+0.91%
2007	411	+2.21%
2012	398	−0.64%
2017	400	+0.10%
2023	404	+0.17%
Source: INSEE

== See also ==
- Communes of the Eure department
