= Rouvray, Eure =

Rouvray
- Commune
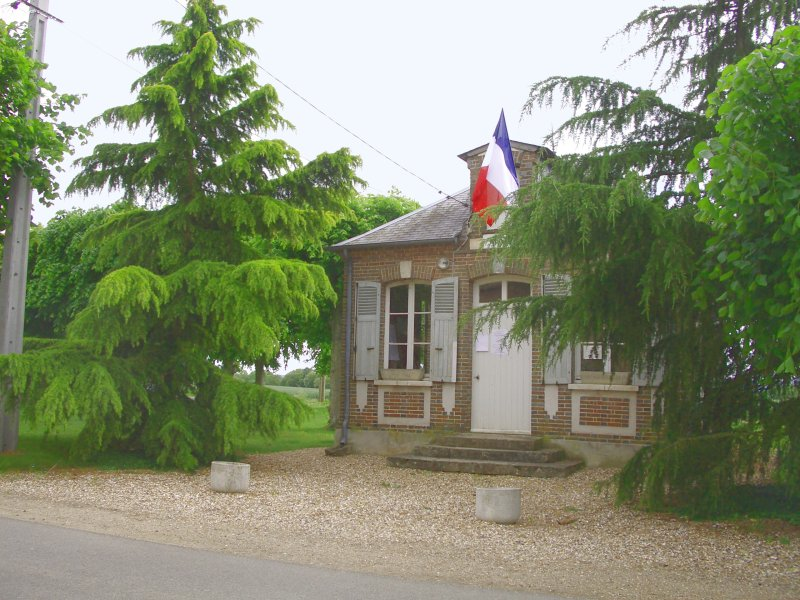
- Town hall

- Coat of arms
- Location of Rouvray
- Location within France Location within Normandy
- Coordinates: 49°03′57″N 1°20′19″E
- Country: France
- Region: Normandy
- Department: Eure
- Arrondissement: Les Andelys
- Canton: Pacy-sur-Eure
- Intercommunality: Seine Normandie Agglomération

Government
  - Mayor (2020–2026): Dominique Desjardins-Brosseau
- Area^{1}: 2.51 km^{2} (0.97 sq mi)
- Elevation: 188 m (617 ft)
- Highest elevation: 127 m (417 ft)
- Lowest elevation: 77 m (253 ft)
- Population (2023): 256
  - Density: 102/km^{2} (264/sq mi)
- Time zone: UTC+01:00 (CET)
  - Summer (DST): UTC+02:00 (CEST)
- INSEE/Postal code: 27501 /27120
- ^{1} French Land Register data, which excludes lakes, ponds, glaciers > 1 km^{2} (0.386 sq mi or 247 acres) and river estuaries.

Rouvray (French pronunciation: [ʁuvʁɛ]) is a commune in the Eure department in northern France.

== Population ==
Historical population
Year	Pop.	±% p.a.
1968	55	—
1975	59	+1.01%
1982	54	−1.26%
1990	111	+9.42%
1999	166	+4.57%
2007	250	+5.25%
2012	276	+2.00%
2017	263	−0.96%
2023	256	−0.45%
Source: INSEE

== Sights ==
The Rouvray chapel rises along the road to the hamlet of Cocherel. Local tradition suggests that the chapel was part of a bigger church that was demolished. Dedicated to St. Martin, the chapel dates from the late fifteenth or early sixteenth century, but from the eleventh century, a church belonging to the monks of Jumièges is known to have existed at Rouvray.

== See also ==
- Communes of the Eure department
