= Chambray =

- Commune
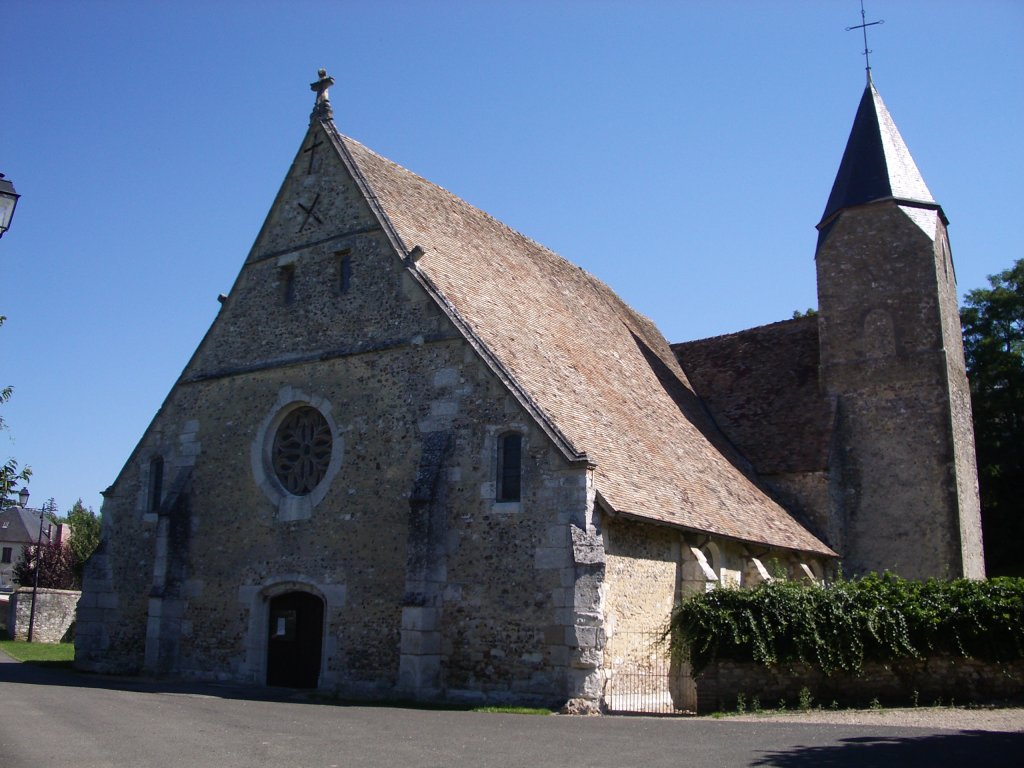
- The church in Chambray
- Location of Chambray
- Location within France Location within Normandy
- Coordinates: 49°04′33″N 1°18′25″E
- Country: France
- Region: Normandy
- Department: Eure
- Arrondissement: Les Andelys
- Canton: Pacy-sur-Eure
- Intercommunality: Seine Normandie Agglomération

Government
  - Mayor (2020–2026): Renée Matringe
- Area^{1}: 8.42 km^{2} (3.25 sq mi)
- Elevation: 33 m (108 ft)
- Highest elevation: 135 m (443 ft)
- Lowest elevation: 30 m (98 ft)
- Population (2023): 391
  - Density: 46.4/km^{2} (120/sq mi)
- Demonym(s): Chambraysien, Chambraysienne
- Time zone: UTC+01:00 (CET)
  - Summer (DST): UTC+02:00 (CEST)
- INSEE/Postal code: 27140 /27120
- ^{1} French Land Register data, which excludes lakes, ponds, glaciers > 1 km^{2} (0.386 sq mi or 247 acres) and river estuaries.

Chambray (French pronunciation: [ʃɑ̃bʁɛ]) is a French commune in the department of Eure, and the region of Normandy, northern France, 13 km (8.1 mi) northeast of Évreux on the north bank of the river Eure.

The Château de Chambray, in the north of the commune, is the ancestral home of the Marquis de Venevelles d'Espagne.

== Population ==
Historical population
Year	Pop.	±% p.a.
1968	300	—
1975	336	+1.63%
1982	383	+1.89%
1990	372	−0.36%
1999	372	+0.00%
2007	458	+2.63%
2012	450	−0.35%
2017	423	−1.23%
2023	391	−1.30%
Source: INSEE

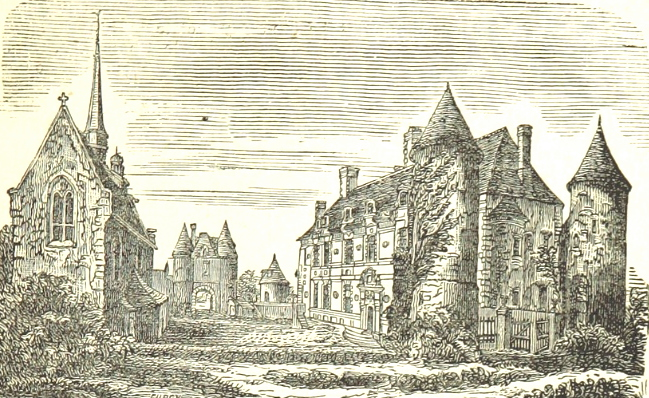
Château de Chambray - image from 1868

== See also ==
- Communes of the Eure department
