= Aigleville =

- Commune
- Location of Aigleville
- Location within France Location within Normandy
- Coordinates: 49°00′29″N 1°25′16″E
- Country: France
- Region: Normandy
- Department: Eure
- Arrondissement: Les Andelys
- Canton: Pacy-sur-Eure
- Intercommunality: Seine Normandie Agglomération

Government
  - Mayor (2020–2026): Patrick Ménard
- Area^{1}: 3.24 km^{2} (1.25 sq mi)
- Elevation: 140 m (460 ft)
- Highest elevation: 137 m (449 ft)
- Lowest elevation: 75 m (246 ft)
- Population (2023): 414
  - Density: 128/km^{2} (331/sq mi)
- Time zone: UTC+01:00 (CET)
  - Summer (DST): UTC+02:00 (CEST)
- INSEE/Postal code: 27004 /27120
- ^{1} French Land Register data, which excludes lakes, ponds, glaciers > 1 km^{2} (0.386 sq mi or 247 acres) and river estuaries.

Aigleville (French pronunciation: [ɛɡləvil]) is a commune in the Eure department in Normandy in northern France.

== Population ==
Historical population
Year	Pop.	±% p.a.
1968	74	—
1975	92	+3.16%
1982	75	−2.88%
1990	104	+4.17%
1999	248	+10.14%
2007	314	+2.99%
2012	351	+2.25%
2017	409	+3.11%
2023	414	+0.20%
Source: INSEE

== See also ==
- Communes of the Eure department
