= Chaignes =

- Commune
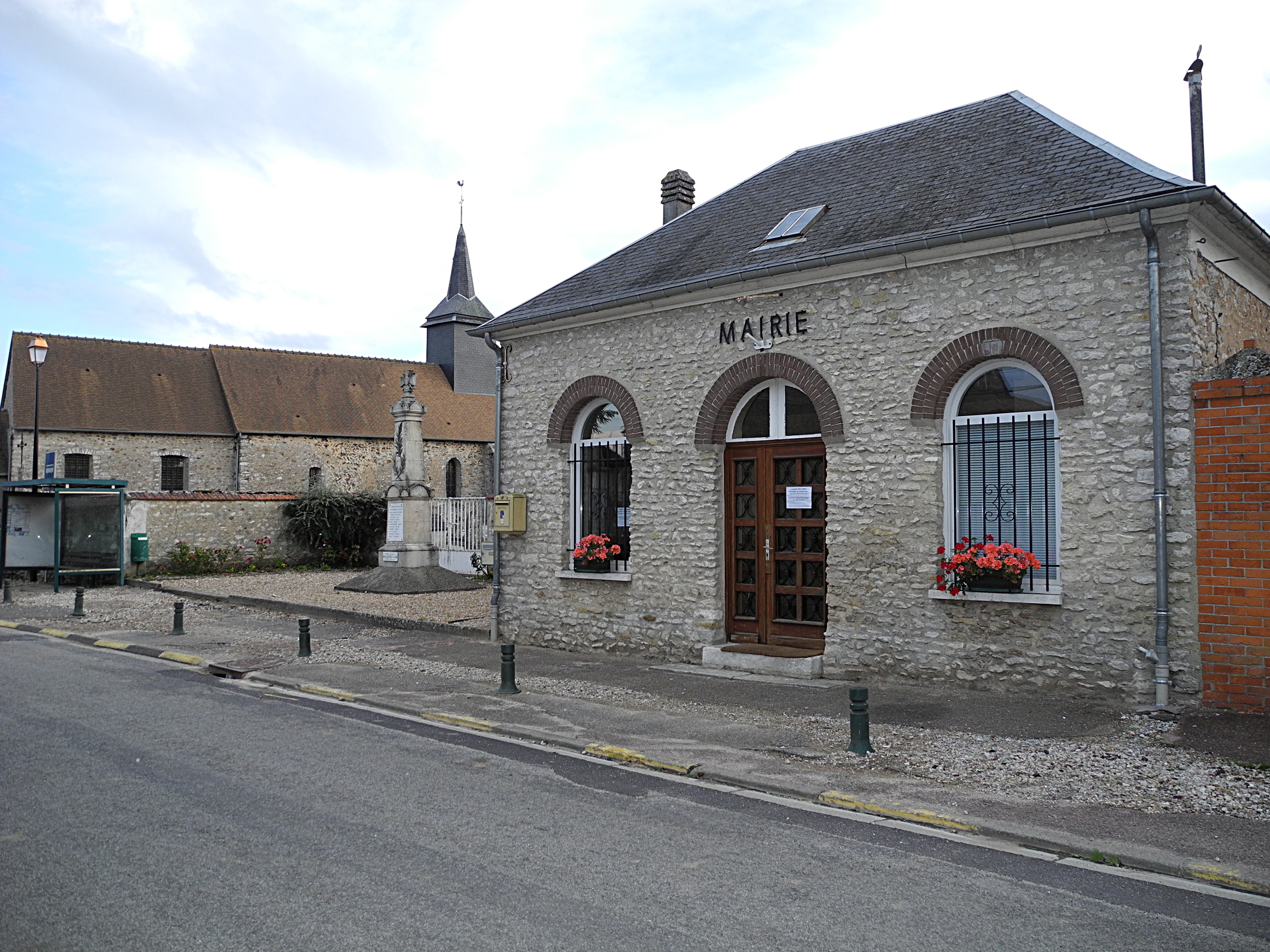
- Town hall
- Location of Chaignes
- Location within France Location within Normandy
- Coordinates: 49°01′02″N 1°26′27″E
- Country: France
- Region: Normandy
- Department: Eure
- Arrondissement: Les Andelys
- Canton: Pacy-sur-Eure
- Intercommunality: Seine Normandie Agglomération

Government
  - Mayor (2020–2026): Guillaume Grimm
- Area^{1}: 6.41 km^{2} (2.47 sq mi)
- Elevation: 148 m (486 ft)
- Highest elevation: 151 m (495 ft)
- Lowest elevation: 97 m (318 ft)
- Population (2023): 270
  - Density: 42/km^{2} (110/sq mi)
- Time zone: UTC+01:00 (CET)
  - Summer (DST): UTC+02:00 (CEST)
- INSEE/Postal code: 27136 /27120
- ^{1} French Land Register data, which excludes lakes, ponds, glaciers > 1 km^{2} (0.386 sq mi or 247 acres) and river estuaries.

Chaignes (French pronunciation: [ʃɛɲ]) is a commune in the Eure department in northern France.

== Population ==
Historical population
Year	Pop.	±% p.a.
1968	180	—
1975	153	−2.29%
1982	179	+2.27%
1990	233	+3.35%
1999	252	+0.87%
2007	302	+2.29%
2012	264	−2.65%
2017	277	+0.97%
2023	270	−0.43%
Source: INSEE

== See also ==
- Communes of the Eure department
