= Sainte-Colombe-près-Vernon =

- Commune
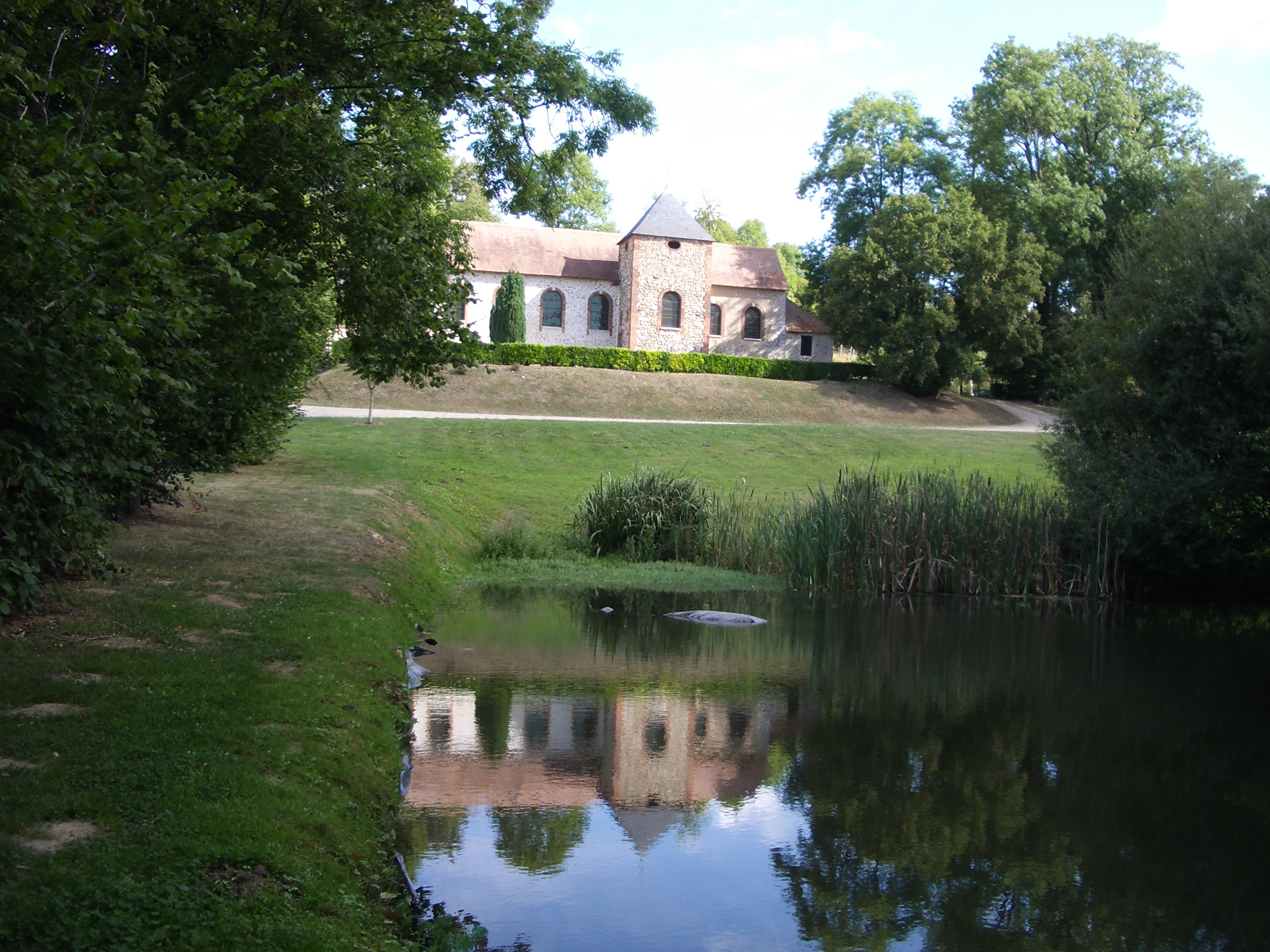
- The church in Sainte-Colombe-près-Vernon

- Coat of arms
- Location of Sainte-Colombe-près-Vernon
- Location within France Location within Normandy
- Coordinates: 49°05′50″N 1°20′21″E
- Country: France
- Region: Normandy
- Department: Eure
- Arrondissement: Les Andelys
- Canton: Pacy-sur-Eure
- Intercommunality: Seine Normandie Agglomération

Government
  - Mayor (2023–2026): Erika Simek
- Area^{1}: 2.69 km^{2} (1.04 sq mi)
- Elevation: 140 m (460 ft)
- Highest elevation: 135 m (443 ft)
- Lowest elevation: 85 m (279 ft)
- Population (2023): 312
  - Density: 116/km^{2} (300/sq mi)
- Time zone: UTC+01:00 (CET)
  - Summer (DST): UTC+02:00 (CEST)
- INSEE/Postal code: 27525 /27950
- ^{1} French Land Register data, which excludes lakes, ponds, glaciers > 1 km^{2} (0.386 sq mi or 247 acres) and river estuaries.

Sainte-Colombe-près-Vernon (French pronunciation: [sɛ̃t kɔlɔ̃b pʁɛ vɛʁnɔ̃], literally Sainte-Colombe near Vernon) is a commune in the Eure department in the Normandy region in northern France.

== Population ==
Historical population
Year	Pop.	±% p.a.
1968	90	—
1975	102	+1.80%
1982	168	+7.39%
1990	221	+3.49%
1999	197	−1.27%
2007	237	+2.34%
2012	316	+5.92%
2017	309	−0.45%
2023	312	+0.16%
Source: INSEE

== See also ==
- Communes of the Eure department
