= Le Cormier =

- Commune
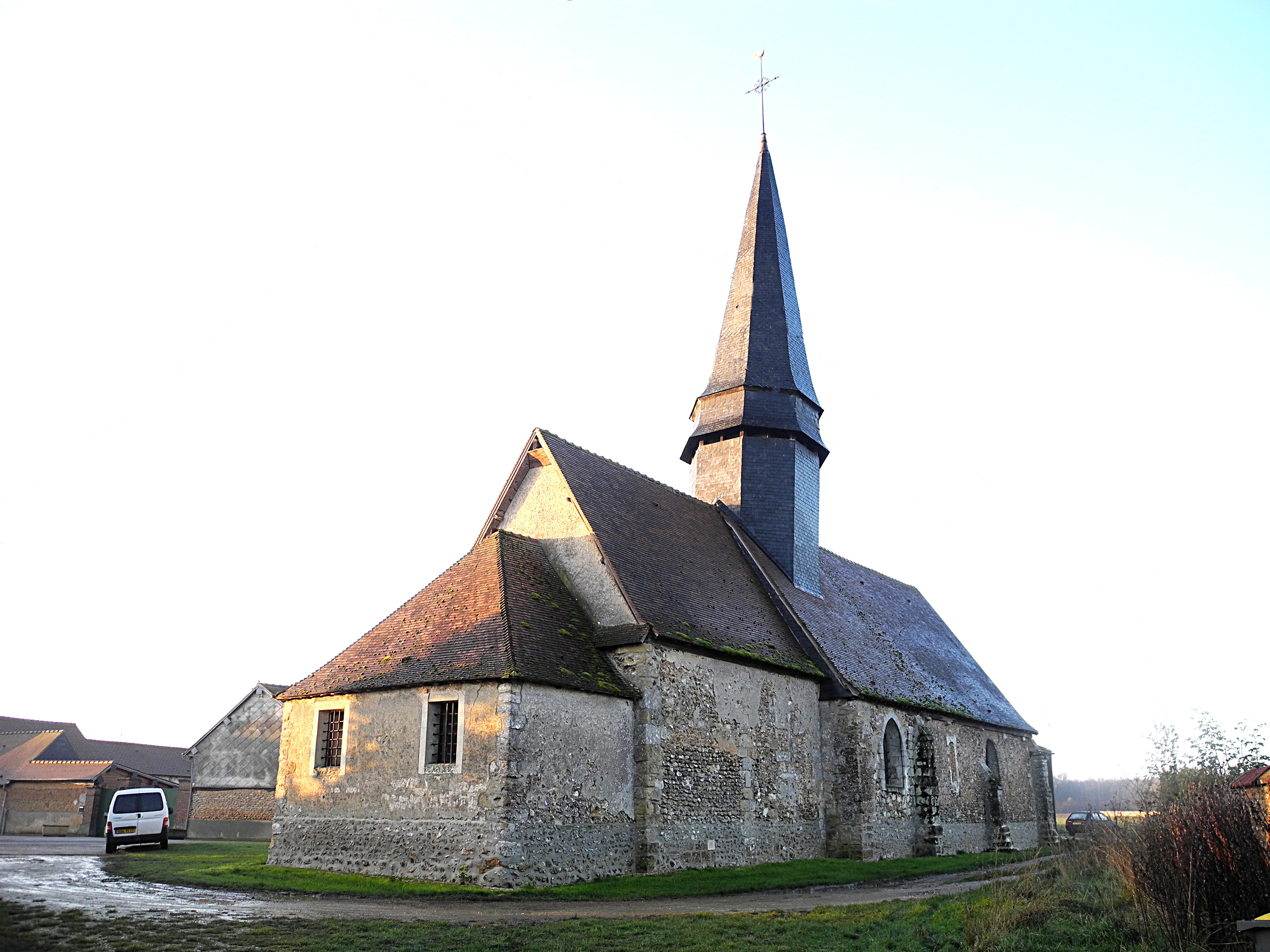
- The church in Le Cormier
- Location of Le Cormier
- Location within France Location within Normandy
- Coordinates: 48°58′38″N 1°18′32″E
- Country: France
- Region: Normandy
- Department: Eure
- Arrondissement: Les Andelys
- Canton: Pacy-sur-Eure
- Intercommunality: Seine Normandie Agglomération

Government
  - Mayor (2020–2026): Sylvain Bignon
- Area^{1}: 10.48 km^{2} (4.05 sq mi)
- Elevation: 137 m (449 ft)
- Highest elevation: 145 m (476 ft)
- Lowest elevation: 72 m (236 ft)
- Population (2023): 361
  - Density: 34.4/km^{2} (89.2/sq mi)
- Time zone: UTC+01:00 (CET)
  - Summer (DST): UTC+02:00 (CEST)
- INSEE/Postal code: 27171 /27120
- ^{1} French Land Register data, which excludes lakes, ponds, glaciers > 1 km^{2} (0.386 sq mi or 247 acres) and river estuaries.

Le Cormier (French pronunciation: [lə kɔʁmje]) is a commune in the Eure department in northern France.

== Population ==
Historical population
Year	Pop.	±% p.a.
1968	221	—
1975	227	+0.38%
1982	289	+3.51%
1990	307	+0.76%
1999	339	+1.11%
2007	387	+1.67%
2012	403	+0.81%
2017	408	+0.25%
2023	361	−2.02%
Source: INSEE

== See also ==
- Communes of the Eure department
