= Saint-Marcel, Eure =

Saint-Marcel
- Commune
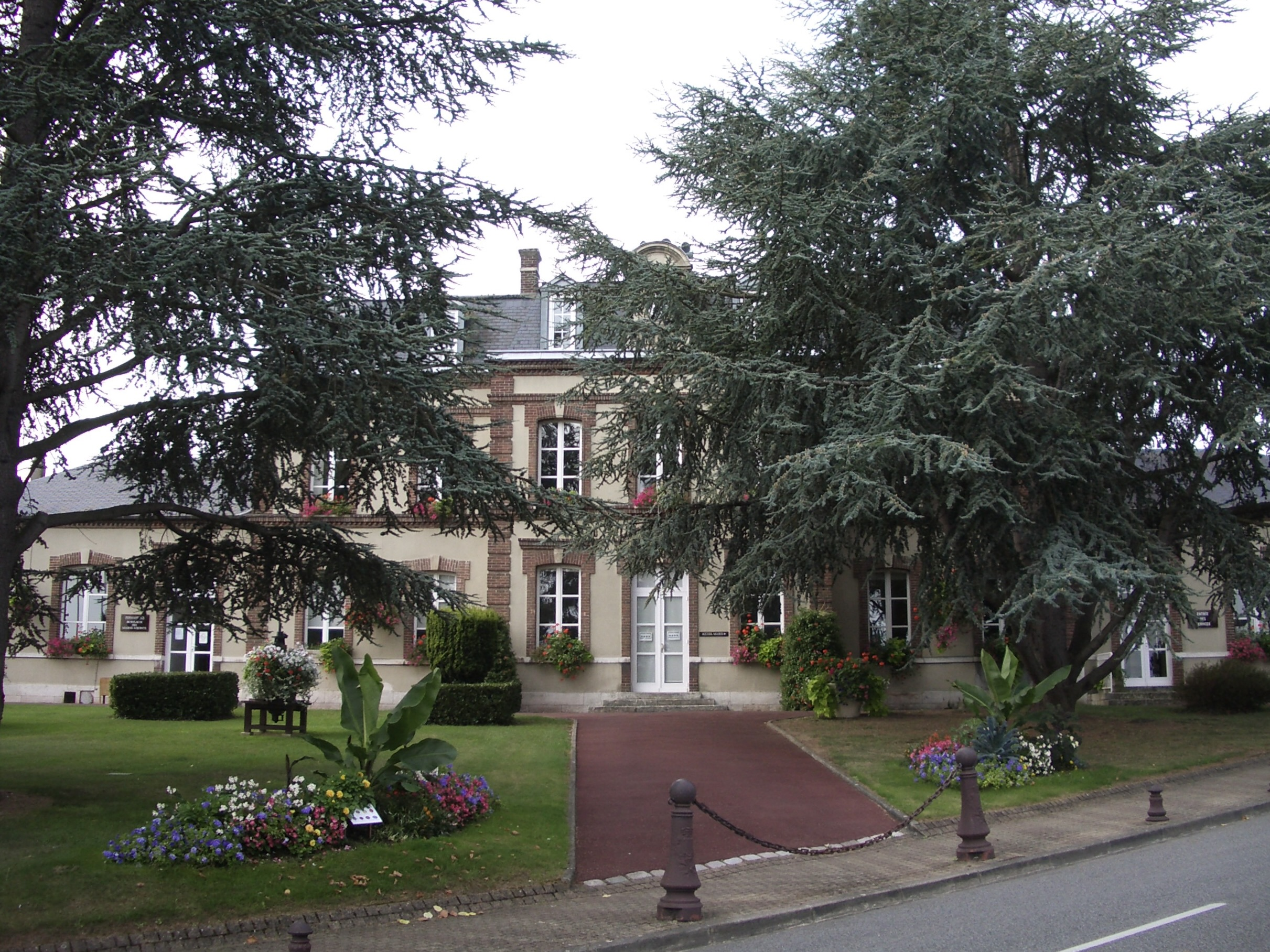
- The town hall in Saint-Marcel

- Coat of arms
- Location of Saint-Marcel
- Location within France Location within Normandy
- Coordinates: 49°05′49″N 1°26′47″E
- Country: France
- Region: Normandy
- Department: Eure
- Arrondissement: Les Andelys
- Canton: Pacy-sur-Eure
- Intercommunality: Seine Normandie Agglomération

Government
  - Mayor (2020–2026): Hervé Podraza
- Area^{1}: 9.93 km^{2} (3.83 sq mi)
- Elevation: 85 m (279 ft)
- Highest elevation: 141 m (463 ft)
- Lowest elevation: 12 m (39 ft)
- Population (2023): 4,512
  - Density: 454/km^{2} (1,180/sq mi)
- Time zone: UTC+01:00 (CET)
  - Summer (DST): UTC+02:00 (CEST)
- INSEE/Postal code: 27562 /27950
- ^{1} French Land Register data, which excludes lakes, ponds, glaciers > 1 km^{2} (0.386 sq mi or 247 acres) and river estuaries.

Saint-Marcel (French pronunciation: [sɛ̃ maʁsɛl]) is a commune in the Eure department in Normandy in northern France.

== Population ==
Historical population
Year	Pop.	±% p.a.
1968	3,470	—
1975	4,198	+2.76%
1982	4,434	+0.78%
1990	4,398	−0.10%
1999	4,982	+1.39%
2007	4,969	−0.03%
2012	4,708	−1.07%
2017	4,493	−0.93%
2023	4,512	+0.07%
Source: INSEE

== See also ==
- Communes of the Eure department
