= Saint-Vincent-des-Bois =

- Commune
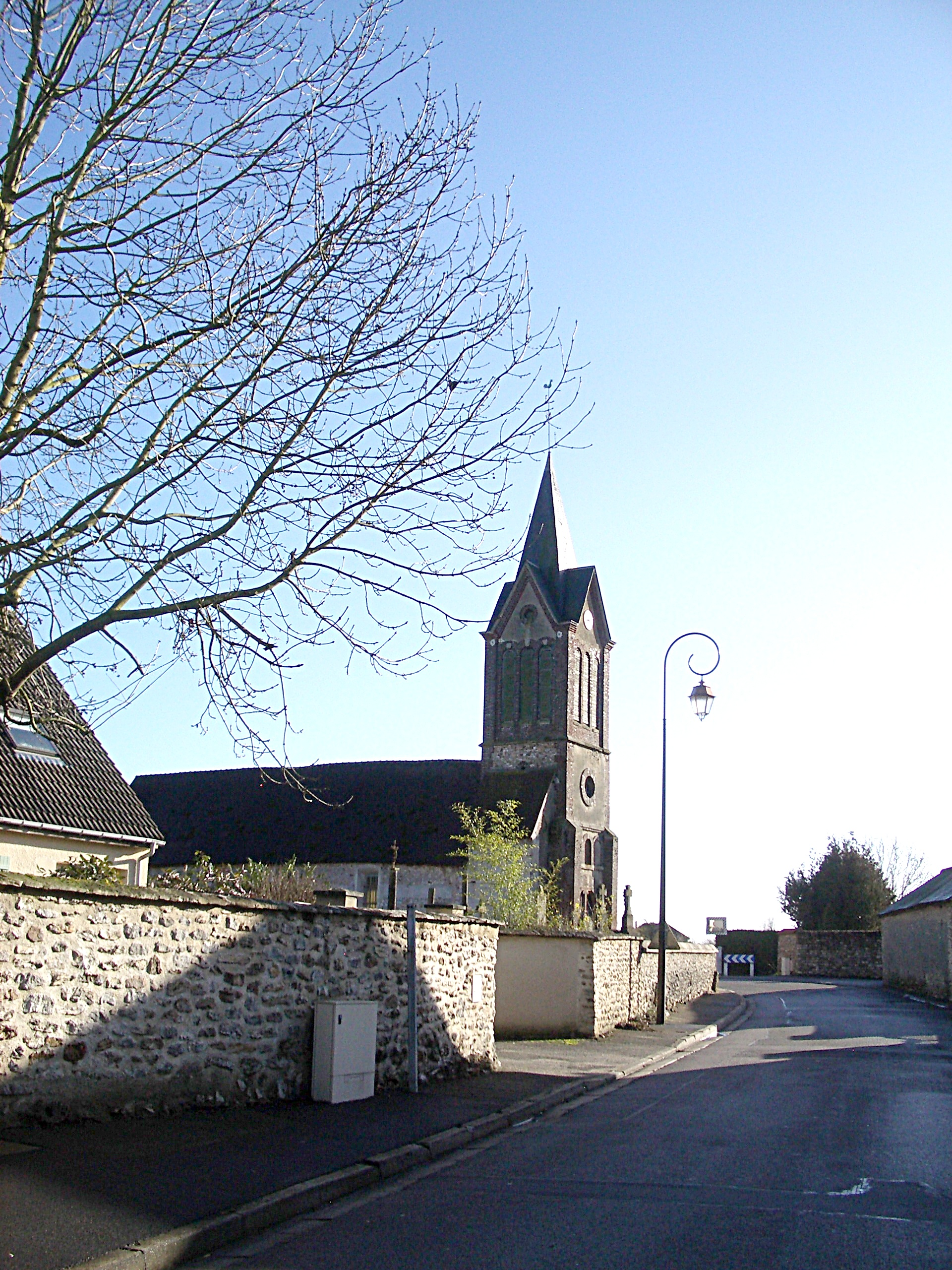
- The church in Saint-Vincent-des-Bois

- Coat of arms
- Location of Saint-Vincent-des-Bois
- Location within France Location within Normandy
- Coordinates: 49°04′20″N 1°23′59″E
- Country: France
- Region: Normandy
- Department: Eure
- Arrondissement: Les Andelys
- Canton: Pacy-sur-Eure
- Intercommunality: Seine Normandie Agglomération

Government
  - Mayor (2020–2026): Thierry Huiban
- Area^{1}: 5.29 km^{2} (2.04 sq mi)
- Elevation: 144 m (472 ft)
- Highest elevation: 146 m (479 ft)
- Lowest elevation: 113 m (371 ft)
- Population (2023): 344
  - Density: 65.0/km^{2} (168/sq mi)
- Time zone: UTC+01:00 (CET)
  - Summer (DST): UTC+02:00 (CEST)
- INSEE/Postal code: 27612 /27950
- ^{1} French Land Register data, which excludes lakes, ponds, glaciers > 1 km^{2} (0.386 sq mi or 247 acres) and river estuaries.

Saint-Vincent-des-Bois (French pronunciation: [sɛ̃ vɛ̃sɑ̃ de bwa]) is a commune in the Eure department in Normandy in northern France.

== Population ==
Historical population
Year	Pop.	±% p.a.
1968	151	—
1975	168	+1.54%
1982	225	+4.26%
1990	243	+0.97%
1999	261	+0.80%
2007	287	+1.19%
2012	341	+3.51%
2017	334	−0.41%
2023	344	+0.49%
Source: INSEE

== See also ==
- Communes of the Eure department
