= Boisset-les-Prévanches =

- Commune
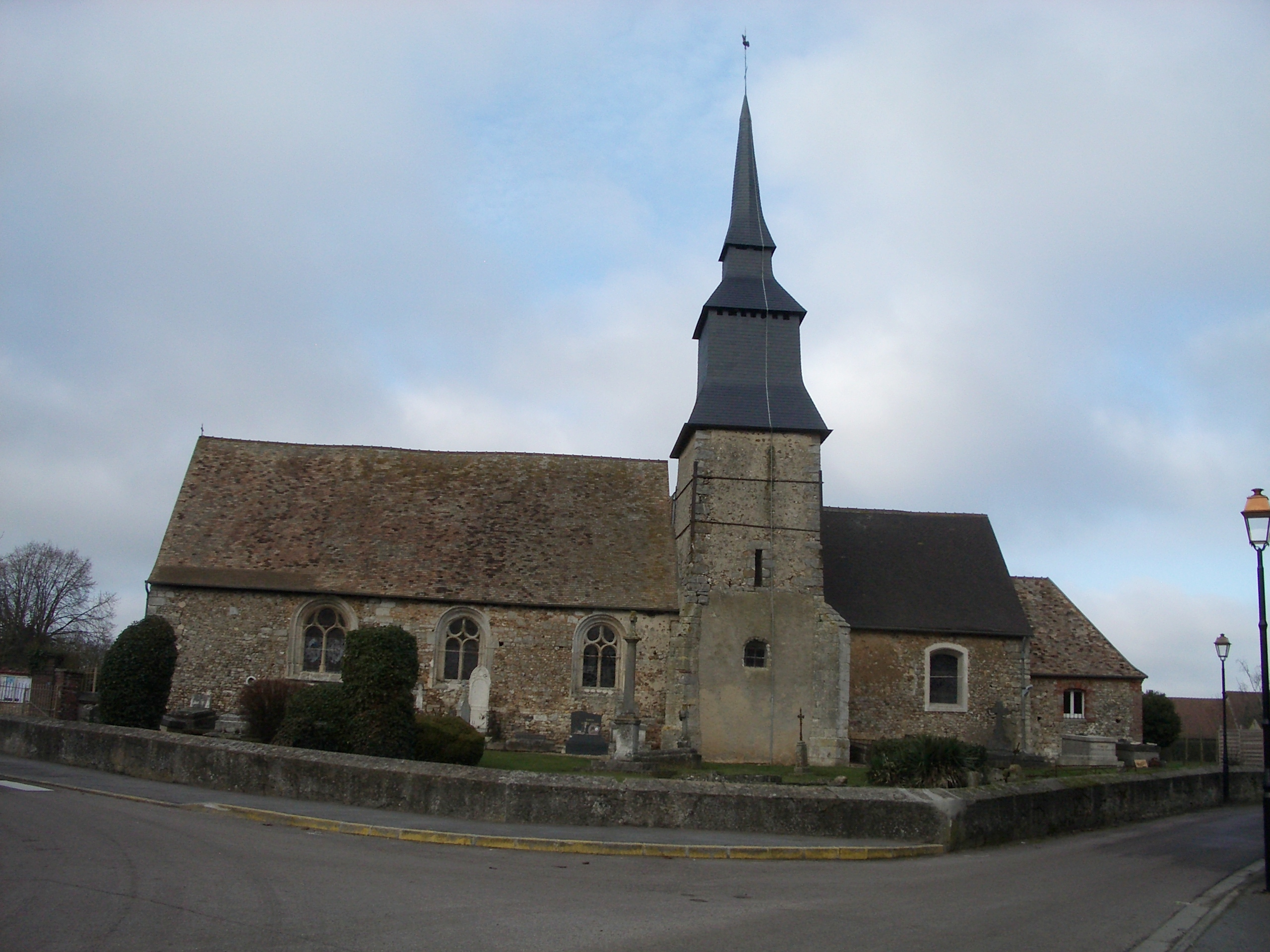
- The church in Boisset-les-Prévanches

- Coat of arms
- Location of Boisset-les-Prévanches
- Location within France Location within Normandy
- Coordinates: 48°58′08″N 1°19′47″E
- Country: France
- Region: Normandy
- Department: Eure
- Arrondissement: Les Andelys
- Canton: Pacy-sur-Eure
- Intercommunality: Seine Normandie Agglomération

Government
  - Mayor (2020–2026): Geneviève Carof
- Area^{1}: 7.46 km^{2} (2.88 sq mi)
- Elevation: 144 m (472 ft)
- Highest elevation: 147 m (482 ft)
- Lowest elevation: 66 m (217 ft)
- Population (2023): 476
  - Density: 63.8/km^{2} (165/sq mi)
- Time zone: UTC+01:00 (CET)
  - Summer (DST): UTC+02:00 (CEST)
- INSEE/Postal code: 27076 /27120
- ^{1} French Land Register data, which excludes lakes, ponds, glaciers > 1 km^{2} (0.386 sq mi or 247 acres) and river estuaries.

Boisset-les-Prévanches (French pronunciation: [bwasɛ le pʁevɑ̃ʃ]) is a commune in the Eure department in Normandy in northern France.

== Population ==
Historical population
Year	Pop.	±% p.a.
1968	323	—
1975	294	−1.33%
1982	292	−0.10%
1990	364	+2.79%
1999	392	+0.83%
2007	431	+1.19%
2012	444	+0.60%
2017	468	+1.06%
2023	476	+0.28%
Source: INSEE

== See also ==
- Communes of the Eure department
