= Hardencourt-Cocherel =

- Commune
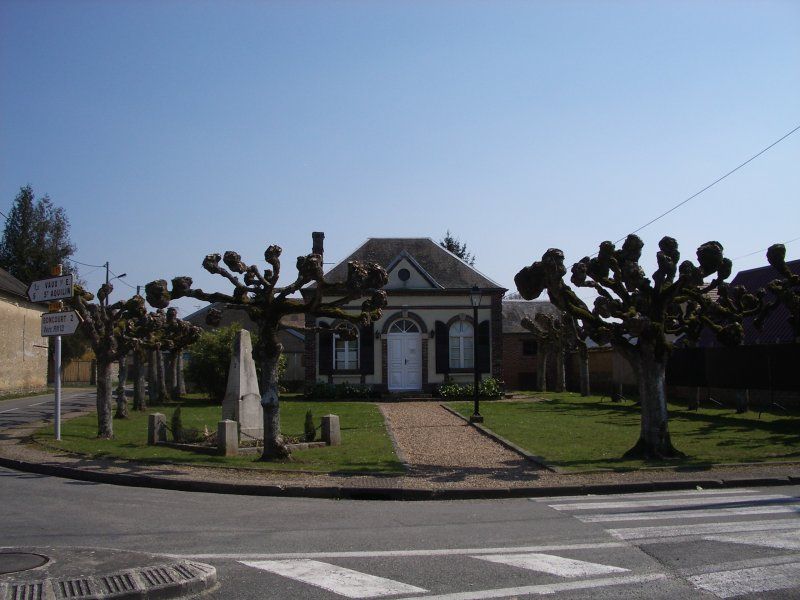
- Town hall
- Location of Hardencourt-Cocherel
- Location within France Location within Normandy
- Coordinates: 49°02′36″N 1°19′13″E
- Country: France
- Region: Normandy
- Department: Eure
- Arrondissement: Les Andelys
- Canton: Pacy-sur-Eure
- Intercommunality: Seine Normandie Agglomération

Government
  - Mayor (2020–2026): Lorraine Leprest
- Area^{1}: 4.93 km^{2} (1.90 sq mi)
- Highest elevation: 129 m (423 ft)
- Lowest elevation: 33 m (108 ft)
- Population (2023): 298
  - Density: 60.4/km^{2} (157/sq mi)
- Time zone: UTC+01:00 (CET)
  - Summer (DST): UTC+02:00 (CEST)
- INSEE/Postal code: 27312 /27120
- ^{1} French Land Register data, which excludes lakes, ponds, glaciers > 1 km^{2} (0.386 sq mi or 247 acres) and river estuaries.

Hardencourt-Cocherel (French pronunciation: [aʁdɑ̃kuʁ kɔʃʁɛl]) is a commune in the Eure department in northern France.

== Population ==
Historical population
| Year | Pop. | ±% p.a. |
|---|---|---|
| 1968 | 137 | — |
| 1975 | 156 | +1.87% |
| 1982 | 130 | −2.57% |
| 1990 | 207 | +5.99% |
| 1999 | 235 | +1.42% |
| 2007 | 274 | +1.94% |
| 2012 | 266 | −0.59% |
| 2017 | 259 | −0.53% |
| 2023 | 298 | +2.37% |
Source: INSEE

== See also ==
- Communes of the Eure department
