= Canton of Pacy-sur-Eure =

Coordinates: 49.02°N 1.38°E

The canton of Pacy-sur-Eure is an administrative division of the Eure department, northern France. Its borders were modified at the French canton reorganisation which came into effect in March 2015. Its seat is in Pacy-sur-Eure.

It consists of the following communes:

1. Aigleville
2. Boisset-les-Prévanches
3. La Boissière
4. Breuilpont
5. Bueil
6. Caillouet-Orgeville
7. Chaignes
8. Chambray
9. La Chapelle-Longueville
10. Le Cormier
11. Croisy-sur-Eure
12. Douains
13. Fains
14. Fontaine-sous-Jouy
15. Gadencourt
16. Hardencourt-Cocherel
17. Hécourt
18. La Heunière
19. Houlbec-Cocherel
20. Jouy-sur-Eure
21. Ménilles
22. Mercey
23. Merey
24. Neuilly
25. Pacy-sur-Eure
26. Le Plessis-Hébert
27. Rouvray
28. Sainte-Colombe-près-Vernon
29. Saint-Marcel
30. Saint-Vincent-des-Bois
31. Vaux-sur-Eure
32. Villegats
33. Villez-sous-Bailleul
34. Villiers-en-Désœuvre
