= La Boissière, Eure =

La Boissière
- Commune
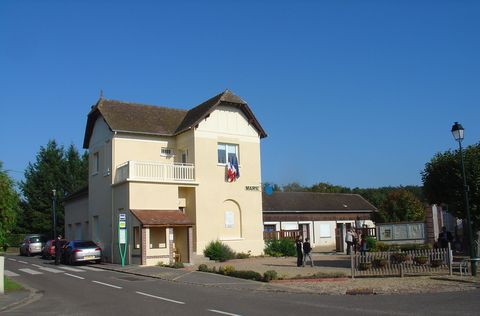
- Town hall

- Coat of arms
- Location of La Boissière
- Location within France Location within Normandy
- Coordinates: 48°56′46″N 1°22′08″E
- Country: France
- Region: Normandy
- Department: Eure
- Arrondissement: Les Andelys
- Canton: Pacy-sur-Eure
- Intercommunality: Seine Normandie Agglomération

Government
  - Mayor (2020–2026): Michel Patez
- Area^{1}: 3.45 km^{2} (1.33 sq mi)
- Elevation: 142 m (466 ft)
- Highest elevation: 146 m (479 ft)
- Lowest elevation: 98 m (322 ft)
- Population (2023): 259
  - Density: 75.1/km^{2} (194/sq mi)
- Time zone: UTC+01:00 (CET)
  - Summer (DST): UTC+02:00 (CEST)
- INSEE/Postal code: 27078 /27220
- ^{1} French Land Register data, which excludes lakes, ponds, glaciers > 1 km^{2} (0.386 sq mi or 247 acres) and river estuaries.

La Boissière (French pronunciation: [la bwasjɛʁ]) is a commune in the Eure department in Normandy in northern France.

== Population ==
Historical population
| Year | Pop. | ±% p.a. |
|---|---|---|
| 1968 | 101 | — |
| 1975 | 86 | −2.27% |
| 1982 | 121 | +5.00% |
| 1990 | 176 | +4.80% |
| 1999 | 225 | +2.77% |
| 2007 | 254 | +1.53% |
| 2012 | 269 | +1.15% |
| 2017 | 273 | +0.30% |
| 2023 | 259 | −0.87% |
Source: INSEE

== See also ==
- Communes of the Eure department
