= Vaux-sur-Eure =

- Commune
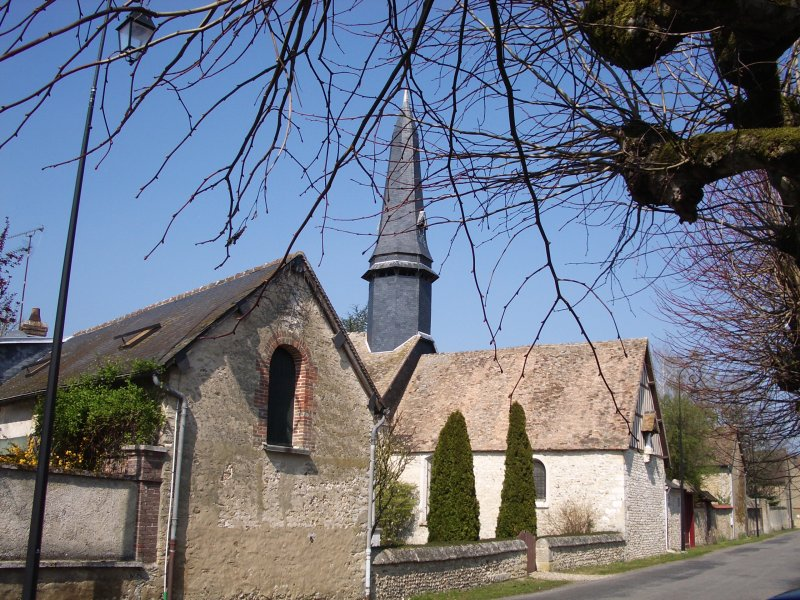
- The church in Vaux-sur-Eure

- Coat of arms
- Location of Vaux-sur-Eure
- Location within France Location within Normandy
- Coordinates: 49°02′33″N 1°20′26″E
- Country: France
- Region: Normandy
- Department: Eure
- Arrondissement: Les Andelys
- Canton: Pacy-sur-Eure
- Intercommunality: Seine Normandie Agglomération

Government
  - Mayor (2020–2026): Patrick Ducroizet
- Area^{1}: 2.9 km^{2} (1.1 sq mi)
- Elevation: 203 m (666 ft)
- Highest elevation: 121 m (397 ft)
- Lowest elevation: 36 m (118 ft)
- Population (2023): 272
  - Density: 94/km^{2} (240/sq mi)
- Time zone: UTC+01:00 (CET)
  - Summer (DST): UTC+02:00 (CEST)
- INSEE/Postal code: 27674 /27120
- ^{1} French Land Register data, which excludes lakes, ponds, glaciers > 1 km^{2} (0.386 sq mi or 247 acres) and river estuaries.

Vaux-sur-Eure (French pronunciation: [vo syʁ œʁ]) is a commune in the Eure department in Normandy in northern France.

== Population ==
Historical population
Year	Pop.	±% p.a.
1968	184	—
1975	195	+0.83%
1982	155	−3.23%
1990	179	+1.82%
1999	240	+3.31%
2007	240	+0.00%
2012	281	+3.20%
2017	270	−0.80%
2023	272	+0.12%
Source: INSEE

== See also ==
- Communes of the Eure department
