= Jouy-sur-Eure =

- Commune
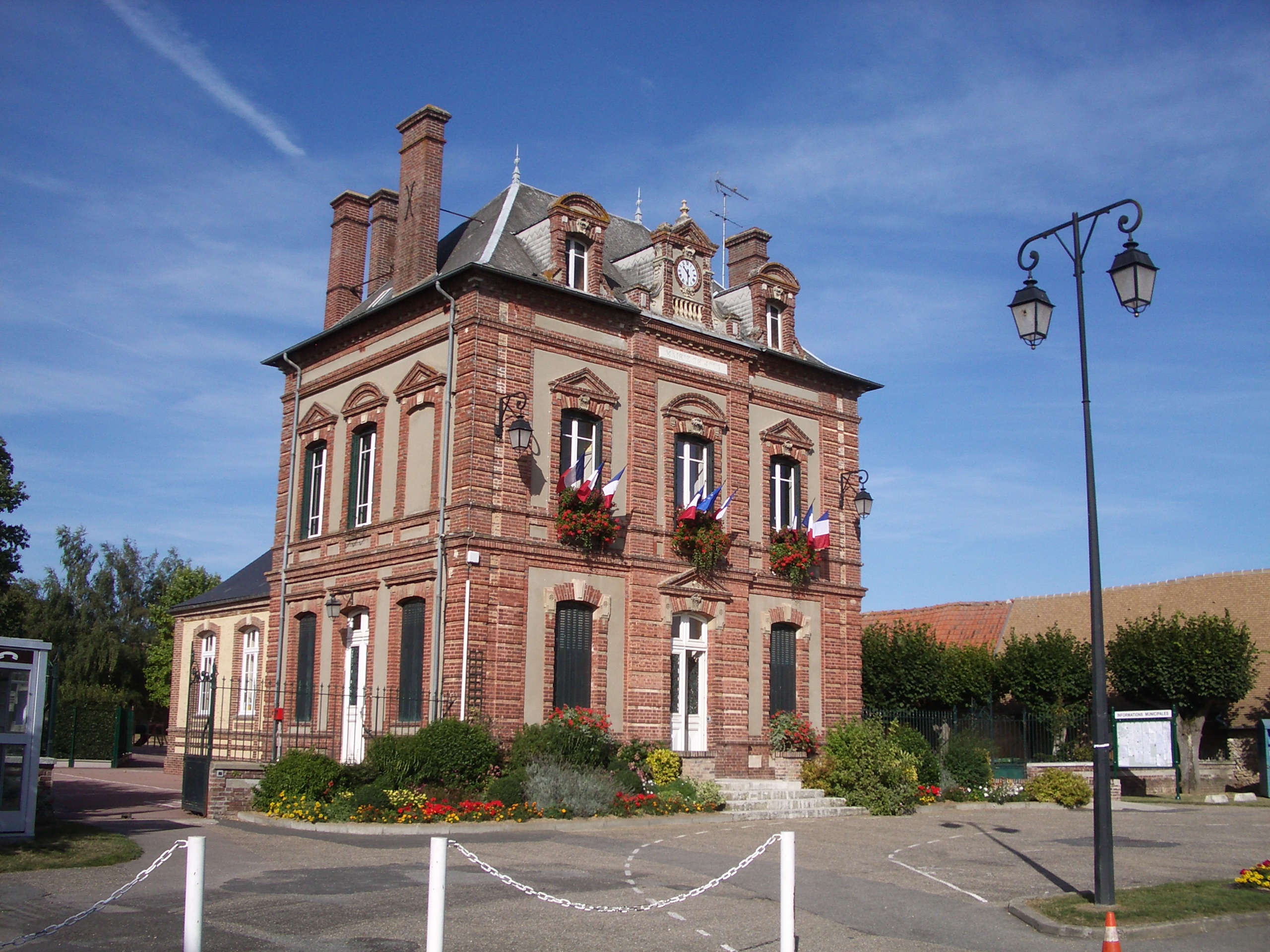
- Town hall
- Location of Jouy-sur-Eure
- Location within France Location within Normandy
- Coordinates: 49°03′01″N 1°18′13″E
- Country: France
- Region: Normandy
- Department: Eure
- Arrondissement: Les Andelys
- Canton: Pacy-sur-Eure
- Intercommunality: Évreux Portes de Normandie

Government
  - Mayor (2020–2026): Philippe Allain
- Area^{1}: 9.8 km^{2} (3.8 sq mi)
- Elevation: 35 m (115 ft)
- Highest elevation: 127 m (417 ft)
- Lowest elevation: 31 m (102 ft)
- Population (2023): 541
  - Density: 55/km^{2} (140/sq mi)
- Time zone: UTC+01:00 (CET)
  - Summer (DST): UTC+02:00 (CEST)
- INSEE/Postal code: 27358 /27120
- ^{1} French Land Register data, which excludes lakes, ponds, glaciers > 1 km^{2} (0.386 sq mi or 247 acres) and river estuaries.

Jouy-sur-Eure (French pronunciation: [ʒwi syʁ œʁ], literally Jouy on Eure) is a commune in the Eure department in Normandy in northern France.

== Population ==
Historical population
Year	Pop.	±% p.a.
1968	370	—
1975	385	+0.57%
1982	430	+1.59%
1990	524	+2.50%
1999	545	+0.44%
2007	570	+0.56%
2012	559	−0.39%
2017	583	+0.84%
2023	541	−1.24%
Source: INSEE

== See also ==
- Communes of the Eure department
