= Mercey, Eure =

Mercey
- Commune
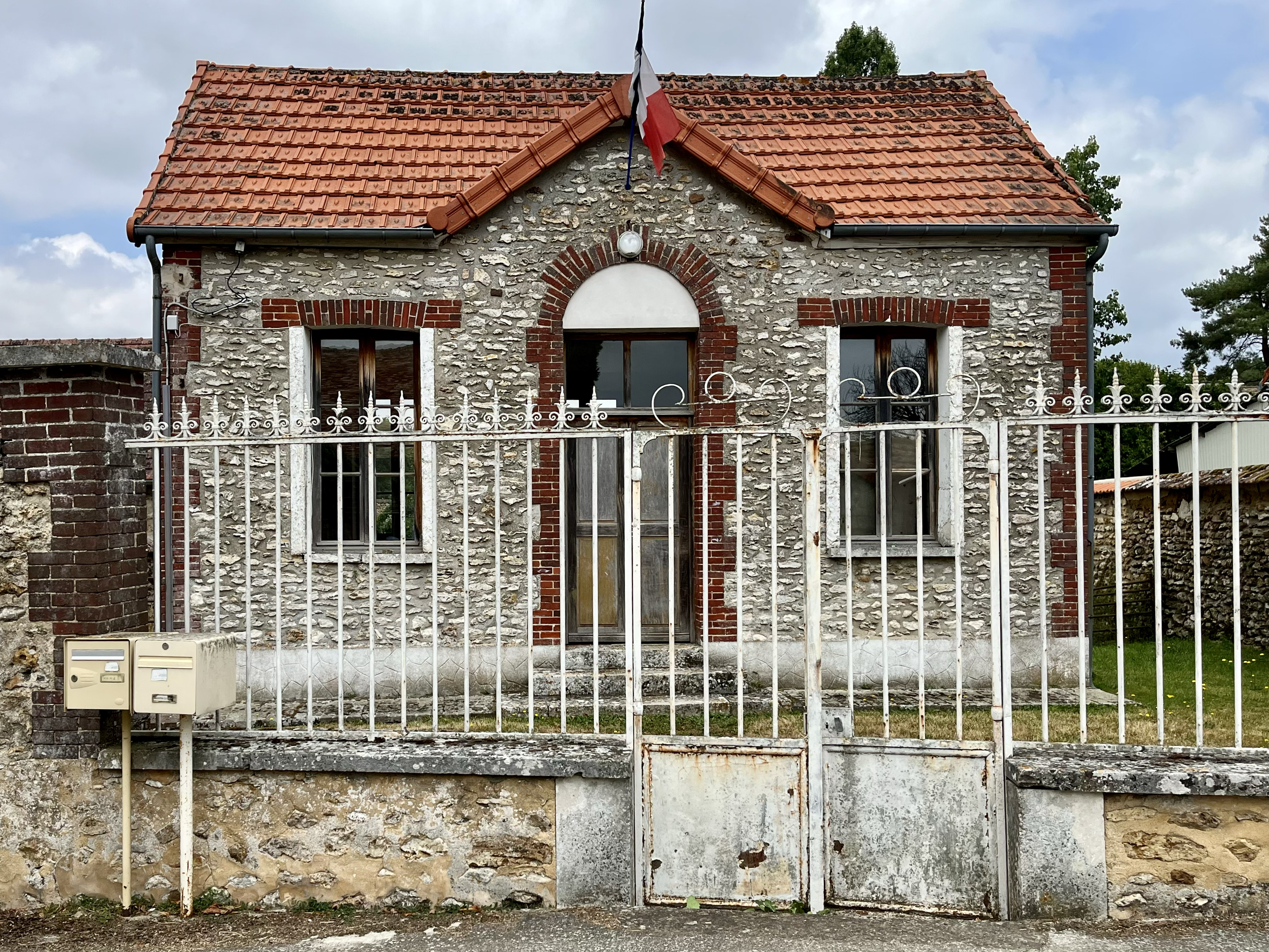
- Mercey Town hall
- Location of Mercey
- Location within France Location within Normandy
- Coordinates: 49°04′50″N 1°23′38″E
- Country: France
- Region: Normandy
- Department: Eure
- Arrondissement: Les Andelys
- Canton: Pacy-sur-Eure
- Intercommunality: Seine Normandie Agglomération

Government
  - Mayor (2020–2026): Yves Deraëve
- Area^{1}: 3.5 km^{2} (1.4 sq mi)
- Elevation: 142 m (466 ft)
- Highest elevation: 146 m (479 ft)
- Lowest elevation: 109 m (358 ft)
- Population (2023): 57
  - Density: 16/km^{2} (42/sq mi)
- Time zone: UTC+01:00 (CET)
  - Summer (DST): UTC+02:00 (CEST)
- INSEE/Postal code: 27399 /27950
- ^{1} French Land Register data, which excludes lakes, ponds, glaciers > 1 km^{2} (0.386 sq mi or 247 acres) and river estuaries.

Mercey (French pronunciation: [mɛʁsɛ]) is a commune in the Eure department in Normandy in northern France.

== Population ==
Historical population
Year	Pop.	±% p.a.
1968	93	—
1975	39	−11.68%
1982	39	+0.00%
1990	46	+2.08%
1999	45	−0.24%
2007	53	+2.07%
2012	51	−0.77%
2017	50	−0.40%
2023	57	+2.21%
Source: INSEE

== See also ==
- Communes of the Eure department
