= Caillouet-Orgeville =

- Commune
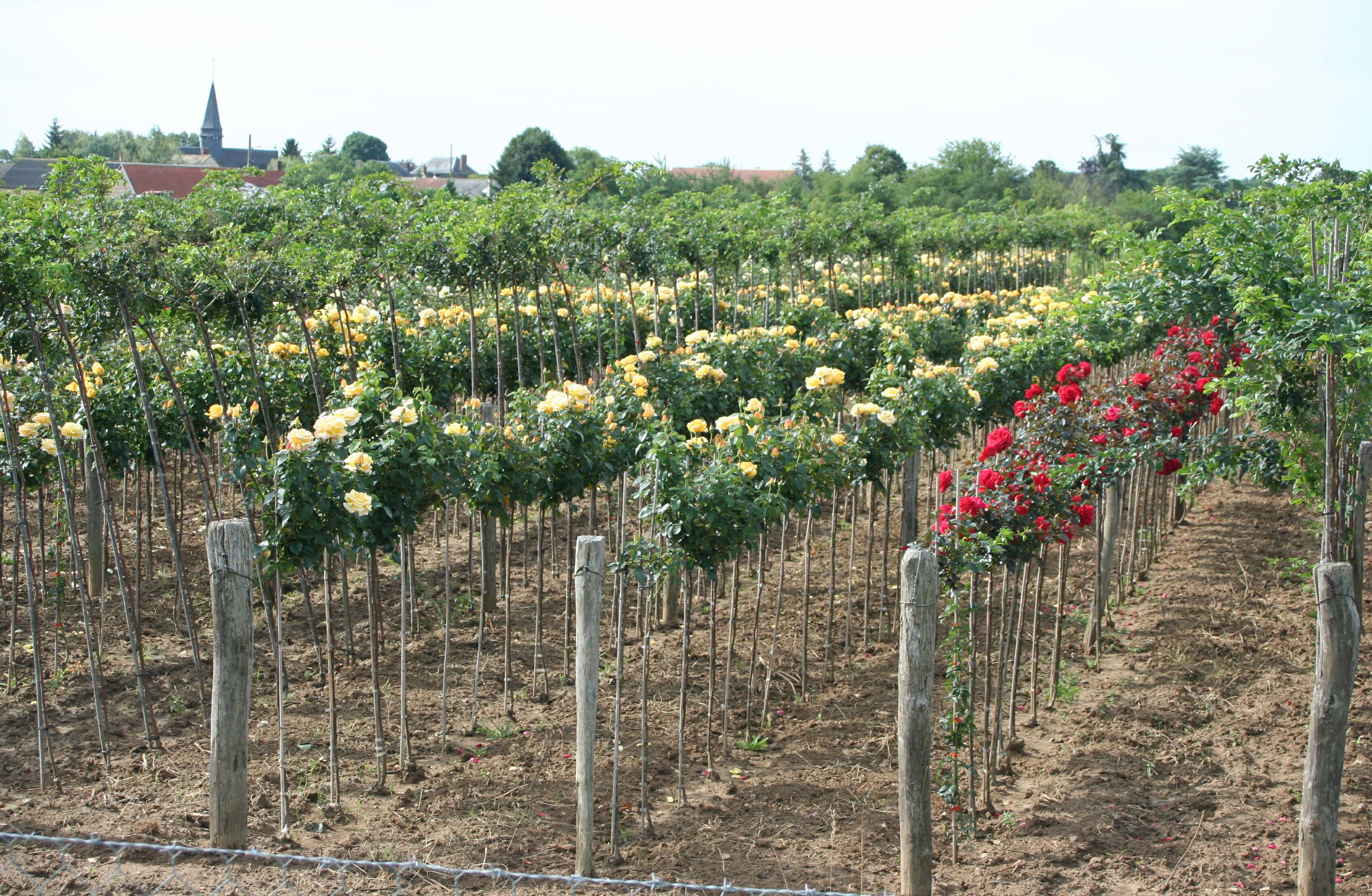
- A rosegrowing nursery in Caillouet-Orgeville
- Location of Caillouet-Orgeville
- Location within France Location within Normandy
- Coordinates: 49°00′33″N 1°18′29″E
- Country: France
- Region: Normandy
- Department: Eure
- Arrondissement: Les Andelys
- Canton: Pacy-sur-Eure
- Intercommunality: Seine Normandie Agglomération

Government
  - Mayor (2020–2026): Jocelyne Ridard
- Area^{1}: 7.89 km^{2} (3.05 sq mi)
- Highest elevation: 136 m (446 ft)
- Lowest elevation: 75 m (246 ft)
- Population (2023): 490
  - Density: 62/km^{2} (160/sq mi)
- Time zone: UTC+01:00 (CET)
  - Summer (DST): UTC+02:00 (CEST)
- INSEE/Postal code: 27123 /27120
- ^{1} French Land Register data, which excludes lakes, ponds, glaciers > 1 km^{2} (0.386 sq mi or 247 acres) and river estuaries.

Caillouet-Orgeville (French pronunciation: [kajwɛ ɔʁʒəvil]) is a commune in the Eure department in northern France.

== Population ==
Historical population
Year	Pop.	±% p.a.
1968	282	—
1975	288	+0.30%
1982	270	−0.92%
1990	336	+2.77%
1999	367	+0.99%
2007	402	+1.15%
2012	419	+0.83%
2017	477	+2.63%
2023	490	+0.45%
Source: INSEE

== See also ==
- Communes of the Eure department
