= Croisy-sur-Eure =

- Commune
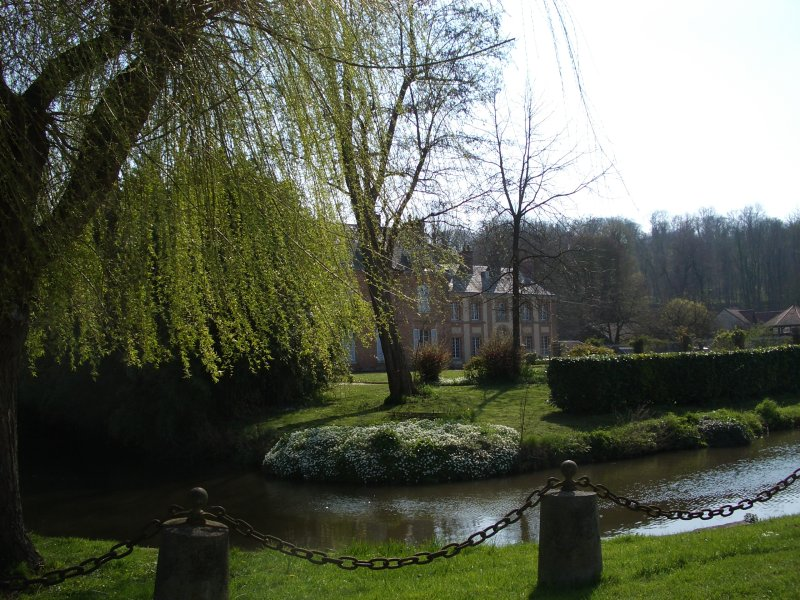
- The château in Croisy-sur-Eure

- Coat of arms
- Location of Croisy-sur-Eure
- Location within France Location within Normandy
- Coordinates: 49°01′48″N 1°20′51″E
- Country: France
- Region: Normandy
- Department: Eure
- Arrondissement: Les Andelys
- Canton: Pacy-sur-Eure
- Intercommunality: Seine Normandie Agglomération

Government
  - Mayor (2020–2026): Jean-Michel de Monicault
- Area^{1}: 3.95 km^{2} (1.53 sq mi)
- Elevation: 148 m (486 ft)
- Highest elevation: 126 m (413 ft)
- Lowest elevation: 36 m (118 ft)
- Population (2023): 222
  - Density: 56.2/km^{2} (146/sq mi)
- Demonym: Croisillons
- Time zone: UTC+01:00 (CET)
  - Summer (DST): UTC+02:00 (CEST)
- INSEE/Postal code: 27190 /27120
- ^{1} French Land Register data, which excludes lakes, ponds, glaciers > 1 km^{2} (0.386 sq mi or 247 acres) and river estuaries.

Croisy-sur-Eure (French pronunciation: [kʁwazi syʁ œʁ]; lit. 'Croisy-on-Eure') is a rural commune in the Eure department in northern France.

== Population ==
Historical population
Year	Pop.	±% p.a.
1968	126	—
1975	161	+3.56%
1982	147	−1.29%
1990	179	+2.49%
1999	233	+2.97%
2007	244	+0.58%
2012	227	−1.43%
2017	188	−3.70%
2023	222	+2.81%
Source: INSEE

== Economy ==
The Gournay cheese Boursin brand is manufactured here.

== See also ==
- Communes of the Eure department
