= Breuilpont =

- Commune
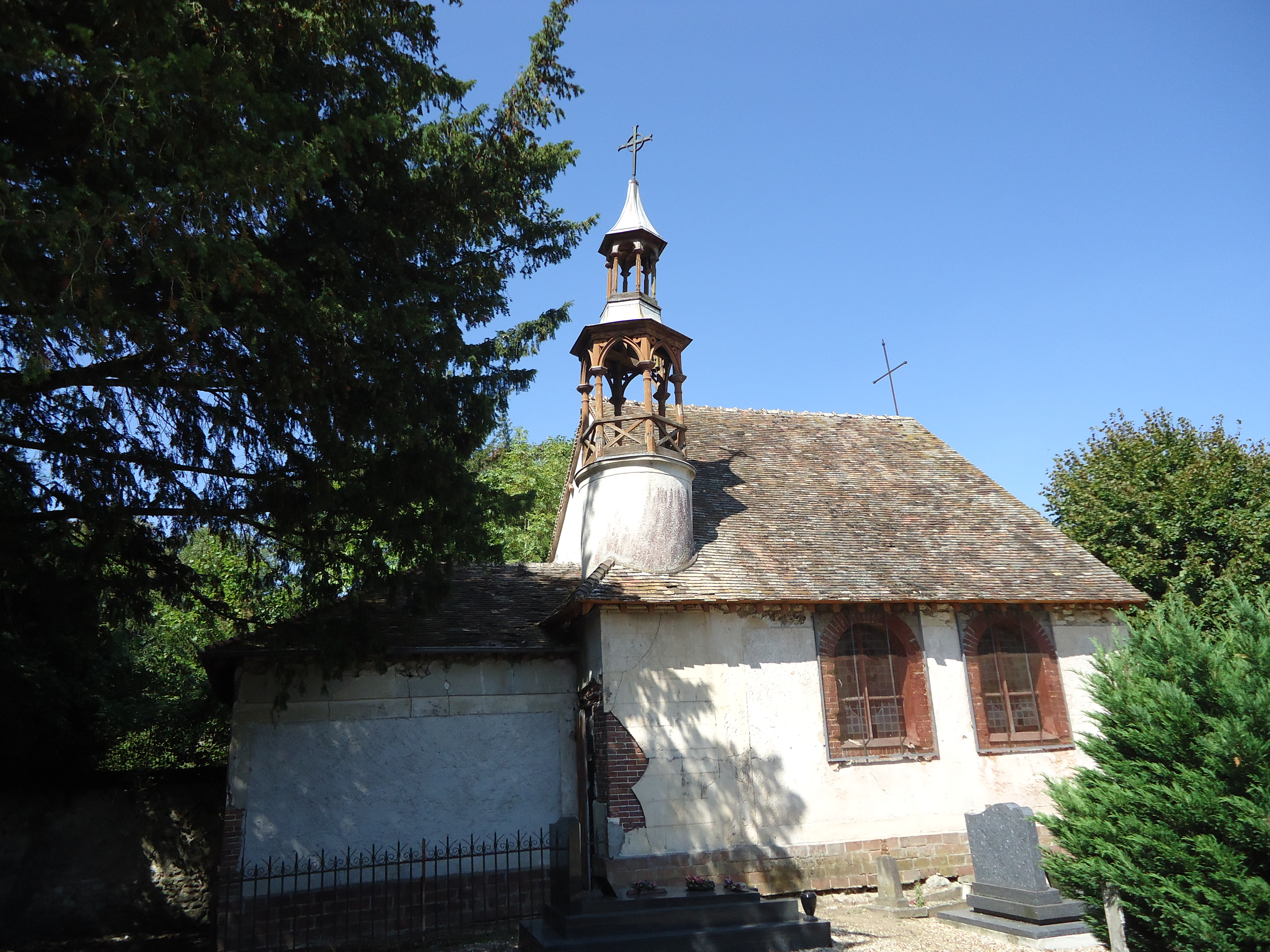
- The chapel in Breuilpont

- Coat of arms
- Location of Breuilpont
- Location within France Location within Normandy
- Coordinates: 48°57′50″N 1°25′38″E
- Country: France
- Region: Normandy
- Department: Eure
- Arrondissement: Les Andelys
- Canton: Pacy-sur-Eure
- Intercommunality: Seine Normandie Agglomération

Government
  - Mayor (2020–2026): Michel Albaro
- Area^{1}: 12.21 km^{2} (4.71 sq mi)
- Elevation: 46 m (151 ft)
- Highest elevation: 137 m (449 ft)
- Lowest elevation: 46 m (151 ft)
- Population (2023): 1,201
  - Density: 98.36/km^{2} (254.8/sq mi)
- Time zone: UTC+01:00 (CET)
  - Summer (DST): UTC+02:00 (CEST)
- INSEE/Postal code: 27114 /27640
- ^{1} French Land Register data, which excludes lakes, ponds, glaciers > 1 km^{2} (0.386 sq mi or 247 acres) and river estuaries.

Breuilpont (French pronunciation: [bʁœjpɔ̃]) is a commune in the Eure department in Normandy in northern France.

== Population ==
Historical population
Year	Pop.	±% p.a.
1968	512	—
1975	515	+0.08%
1982	592	+2.01%
1990	985	+6.57%
1999	1,111	+1.35%
2007	1,153	+0.46%
2012	1,204	+0.87%
2017	1,222	+0.30%
2023	1,201	−0.29%
Source: INSEE

== See also ==
- Communes of the Eure department
