= Fains =

- Commune
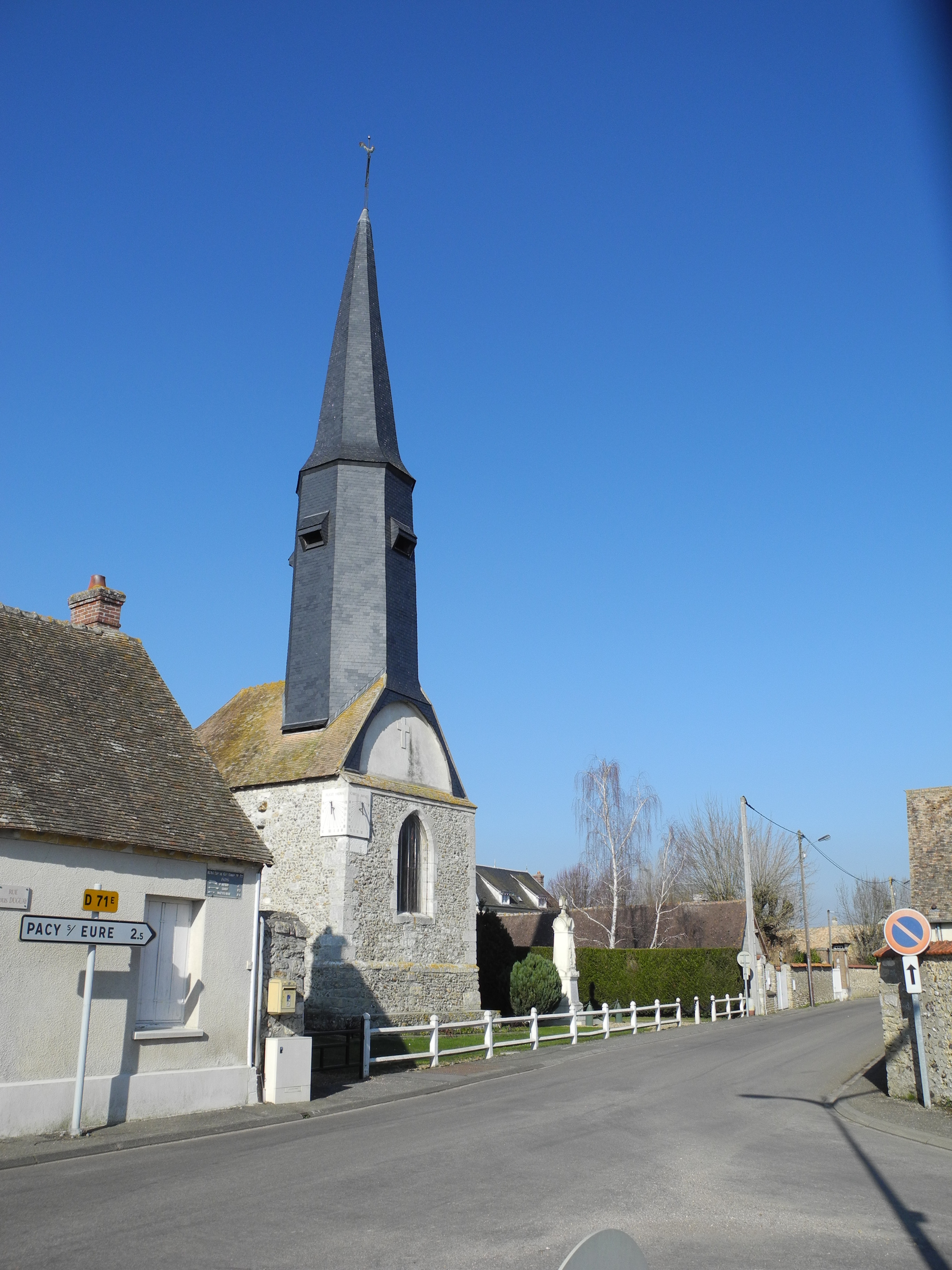
- The church in Fains

- Coat of arms
- Location of Fains
- Location within France Location within Normandy
- Coordinates: 48°59′50″N 1°23′17″E
- Country: France
- Region: Normandy
- Department: Eure
- Arrondissement: Les Andelys
- Canton: Pacy-sur-Eure
- Intercommunality: Seine Normandie Agglomération

Government
  - Mayor (2020–2026): Pascal Duguay
- Area^{1}: 3.77 km^{2} (1.46 sq mi)
- Elevation: 120 m (390 ft)
- Highest elevation: 126 m (413 ft)
- Lowest elevation: 40 m (130 ft)
- Population (2023): 409
  - Density: 108/km^{2} (281/sq mi)
- Time zone: UTC+01:00 (CET)
  - Summer (DST): UTC+02:00 (CEST)
- INSEE/Postal code: 27231 /27120
- ^{1} French Land Register data, which excludes lakes, ponds, glaciers > 1 km^{2} (0.386 sq mi or 247 acres) and river estuaries.

Fains is a commune in the Eure department in the Normandy region in northern France.

== Population ==
Historical population
Year	Pop.	±% p.a.
1968	209	—
1975	286	+4.58%
1982	296	+0.49%
1990	355	+2.30%
1999	327	−0.91%
2007	416	+3.05%
2012	394	−1.08%
2017	440	+2.23%
2023	409	−1.21%
Source: INSEE

== See also ==
- Communes of the Eure department
