= Hécourt, Eure =

Hécourt
- Commune
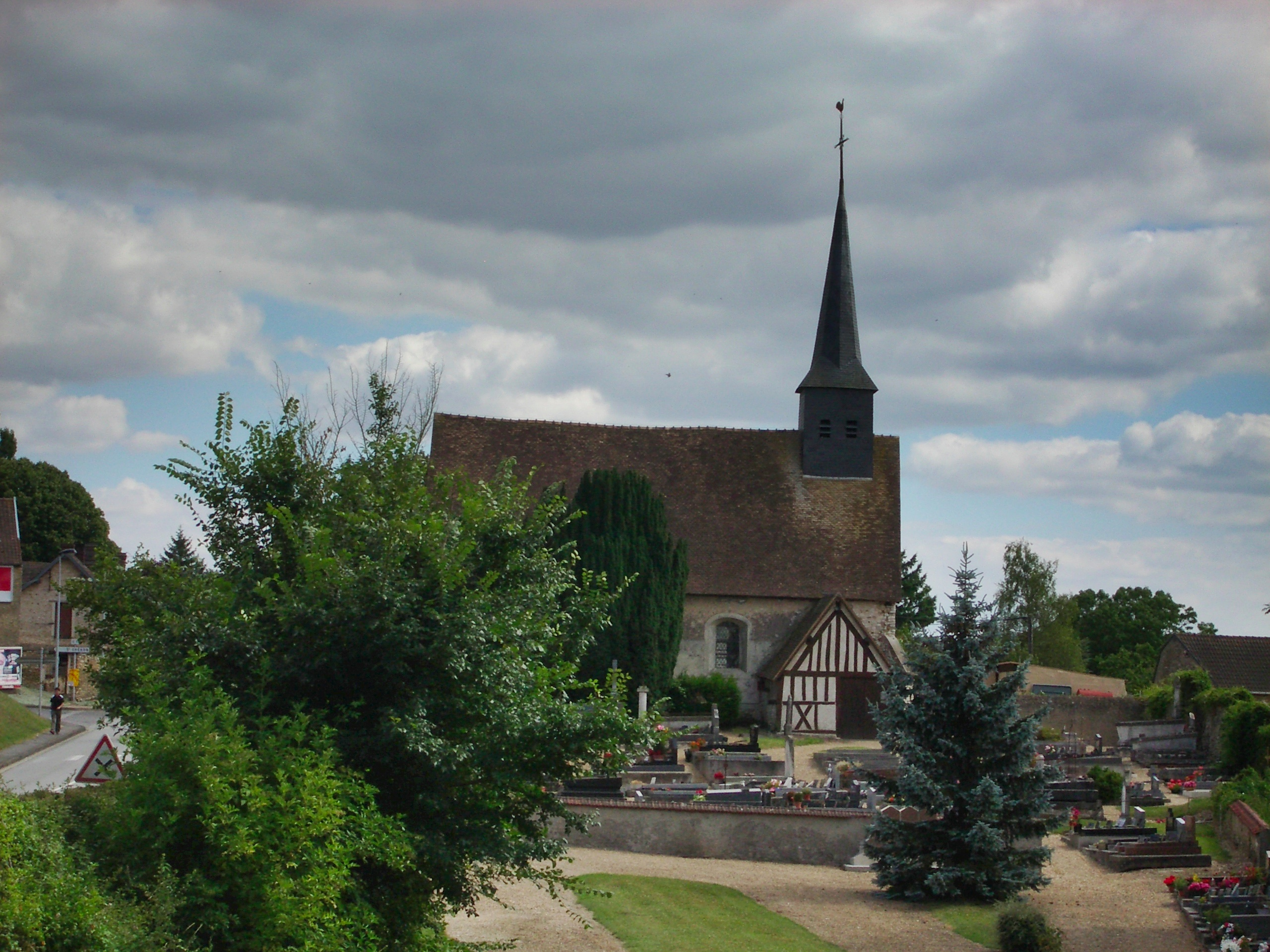
- The church of Saint-Taurin in Hécourt
- Location of Hécourt
- Location within France Location within Normandy
- Coordinates: 48°58′45″N 1°25′20″E
- Country: France
- Region: Normandy
- Department: Eure
- Arrondissement: Les Andelys
- Canton: Pacy-sur-Eure
- Intercommunality: Seine Normandie Agglomération

Government
  - Mayor (2021–2026): Lydie Legros
- Area^{1}: 7.73 km^{2} (2.98 sq mi)
- Elevation: 56 m (184 ft)
- Highest elevation: 135 m (443 ft)
- Lowest elevation: 42 m (138 ft)
- Population (2023): 325
  - Density: 42.0/km^{2} (109/sq mi)
- Time zone: UTC+01:00 (CET)
  - Summer (DST): UTC+02:00 (CEST)
- INSEE/Postal code: 27326 /27120
- ^{1} French Land Register data, which excludes lakes, ponds, glaciers > 1 km^{2} (0.386 sq mi or 247 acres) and river estuaries.

Hécourt (French pronunciation: [ekuʁ]) is a commune in the Eure department and Normandy region of France.

== Population ==
Historical population
Year	Pop.	±% p.a.
1968	168	—
1975	183	+1.23%
1982	212	+2.12%
1990	274	+3.26%
1999	294	+0.79%
2007	336	+1.68%
2012	350	+0.82%
2017	330	−1.17%
2023	325	−0.25%
Source: INSEE

== See also ==
- Communes of the Eure department
