= Bueil =

- Commune
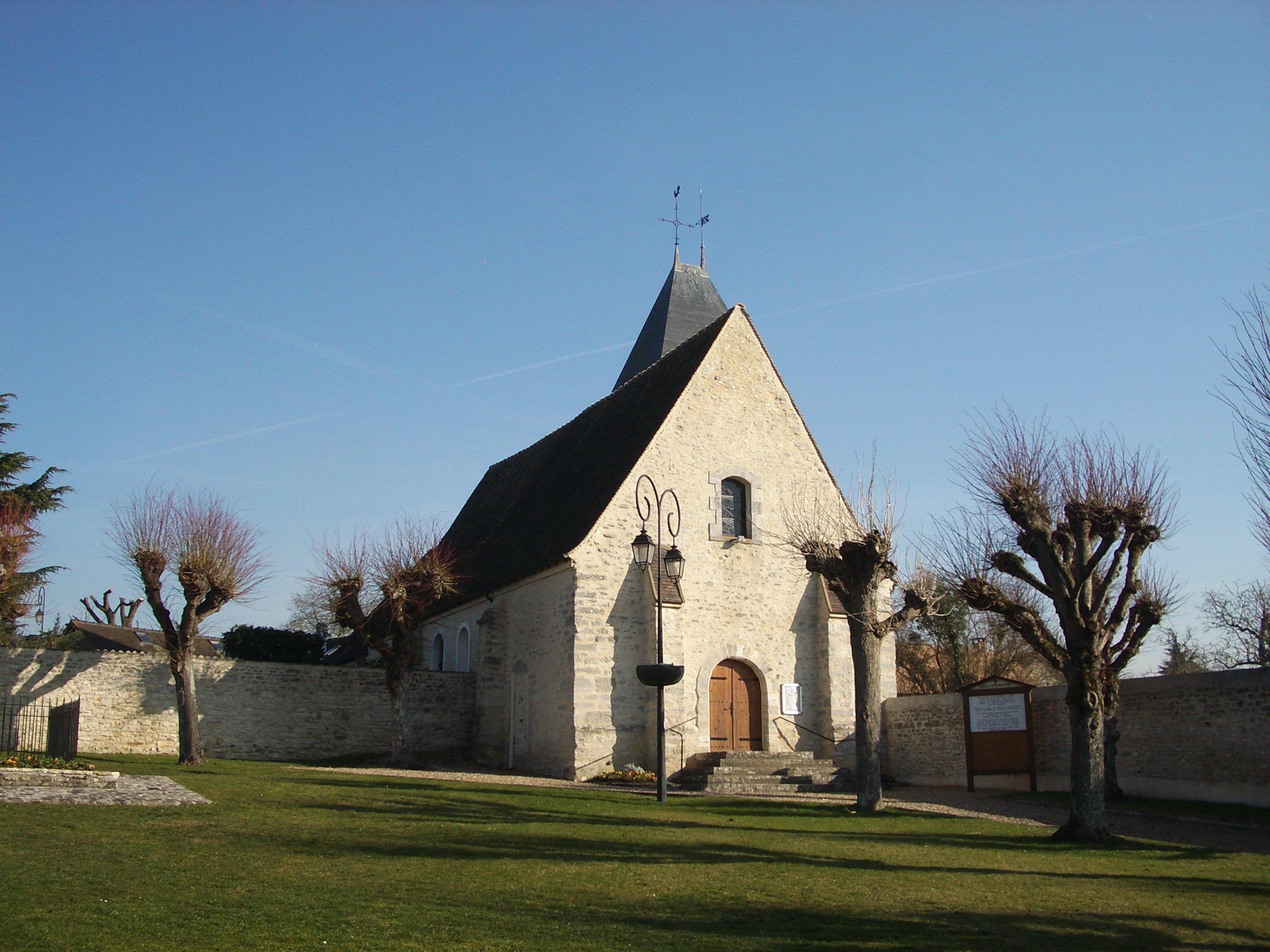
- The church in Bueil

- Coat of arms
- Location of Bueil
- Location within France Location within Normandy
- Coordinates: 48°55′51″N 1°26′32″E
- Country: France
- Region: Normandy
- Department: Eure
- Arrondissement: Les Andelys
- Canton: Pacy-sur-Eure
- Intercommunality: Seine Normandie Agglomération

Government
  - Mayor (2020–2026): Michel Cither
- Area^{1}: 4.91 km^{2} (1.90 sq mi)
- Elevation: 64 m (210 ft)
- Highest elevation: 136 m (446 ft)
- Lowest elevation: 47 m (154 ft)
- Population (2023): 1,642
  - Density: 334/km^{2} (866/sq mi)
- Time zone: UTC+01:00 (CET)
  - Summer (DST): UTC+02:00 (CEST)
- INSEE/Postal code: 27119 /27730
- ^{1} French Land Register data, which excludes lakes, ponds, glaciers > 1 km^{2} (0.386 sq mi or 247 acres) and river estuaries.

Bueil (French pronunciation: [bɥɛj]) is a commune in the Eure department in Normandy in northern France.

== Population ==
Historical population
Year	Pop.	±% p.a.
1968	455	—
1975	526	+2.09%
1982	1,003	+9.66%
1990	1,331	+3.60%
1999	1,393	+0.51%
2007	1,501	+0.94%
2012	1,497	−0.05%
2017	1,621	+1.60%
2023	1,642	+0.21%
Source: INSEE

== See also ==
- Communes of the Eure department
