= Merey, Eure =

Merey
- Commune
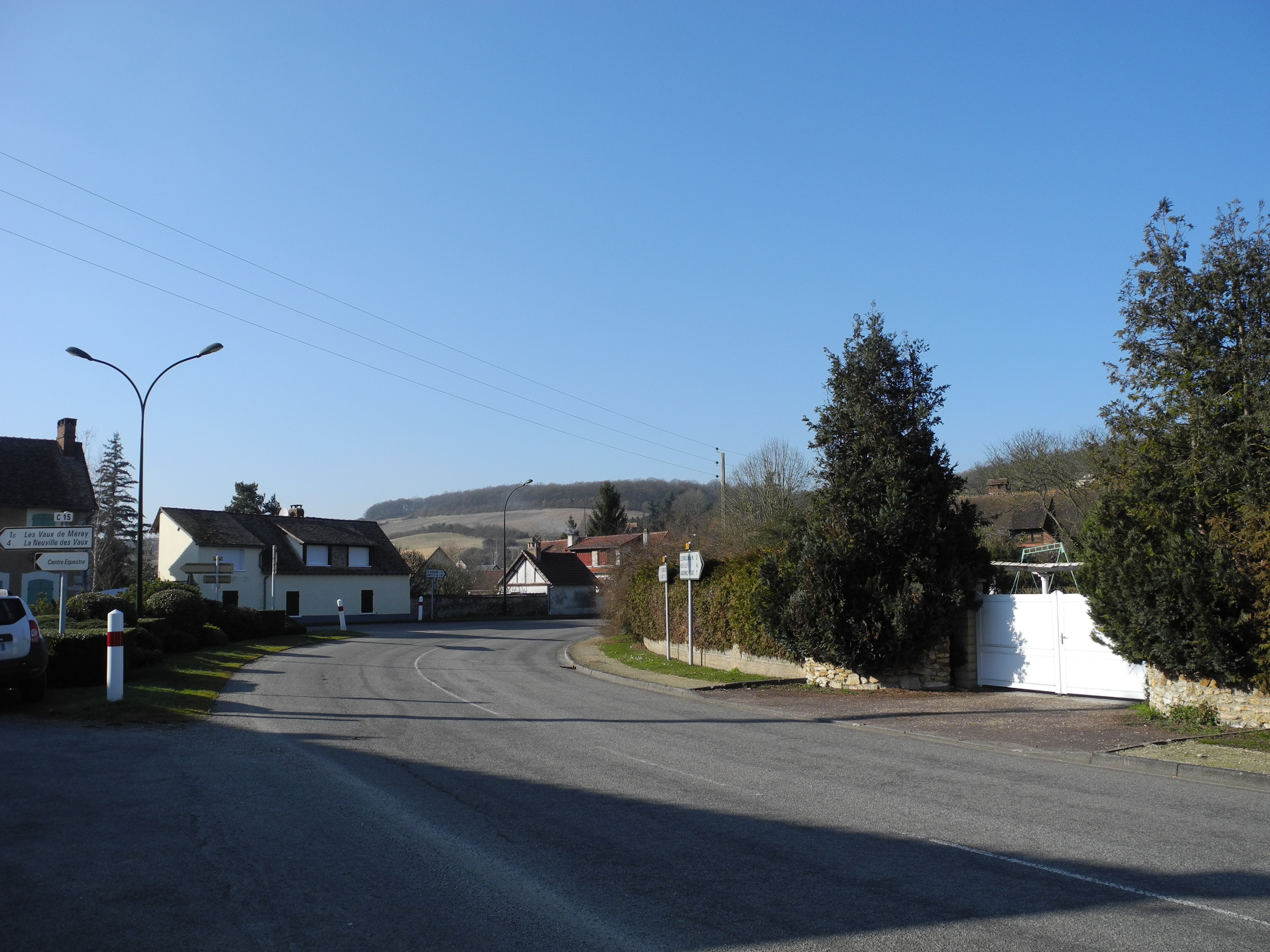
- A road in Merey

- Coat of arms
- Location of Merey
- Location within France Location within Normandy
- Coordinates: 48°58′00″N 1°24′30″E
- Country: France
- Region: Normandy
- Department: Eure
- Arrondissement: Les Andelys
- Canton: Pacy-sur-Eure
- Intercommunality: Seine Normandie Agglomération

Government
  - Mayor (2024–2026): Gérard Petit
- Area^{1}: 8.66 km^{2} (3.34 sq mi)
- Elevation: 50 m (160 ft)
- Highest elevation: 133 m (436 ft)
- Lowest elevation: 45 m (148 ft)
- Population (2023): 347
  - Density: 40.1/km^{2} (104/sq mi)
- Time zone: UTC+01:00 (CET)
  - Summer (DST): UTC+02:00 (CEST)
- INSEE/Postal code: 27400 /27640
- ^{1} French Land Register data, which excludes lakes, ponds, glaciers > 1 km^{2} (0.386 sq mi or 247 acres) and river estuaries.

Merey (French pronunciation: [məʁɛ]) is a commune in the Eure department of the Normandy region in northern France.

== History ==
As Madrie (Pagus Madriensis, later pays de Merey) it was a pagus in the north of Gaul lying between the Seine river and the rivers Eure and Iton. At the beginning of the fifth century, when the Notitia provinciarum was compiled, it was a Roman administrative division or pagus of Provincia Lugdunensis Secunda.

In the ninth-century Carolingian Empire. In 822, Pepin, king of Aquitaine married Ingeltrude (also called Engelberga, Hringard, or Ringart), daughter of Theodobert, count of Madrie (c. 800-after 876), who was a son of Nibelung (Nivelan) of the royal house of the Burgundians.

It became part of Normandy in the 10th century and is now in the region called Normandy.

== Population ==
Historical population
Year	Pop.	±% p.a.
1968	127	—
1975	138	+1.19%
1982	192	+4.83%
1990	185	−0.46%
1999	260	+3.85%
2007	289	+1.33%
2012	339	+3.24%
2017	348	+0.53%
2023	347	−0.05%
Source: INSEE

== Personalities ==
In 1694 Francois Quesnay was born at Merey.

== See also ==
- Communes of the Eure department
