= Ménilles =

- Commune
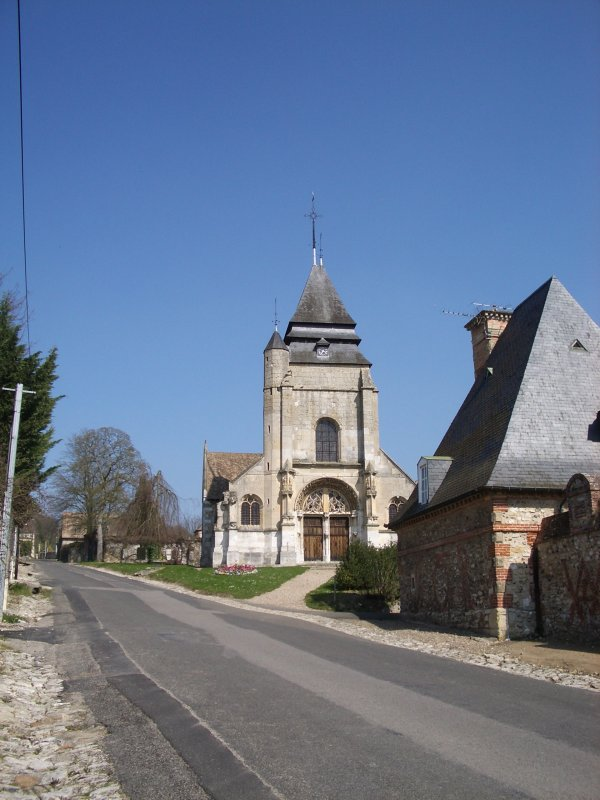
- The church in Ménilles

- Coat of arms
- Location of Ménilles
- Location within France Location within Normandy
- Coordinates: 49°02′03″N 1°21′58″E
- Country: France
- Region: Normandy
- Department: Eure
- Arrondissement: Les Andelys
- Canton: Pacy-sur-Eure
- Intercommunality: Seine Normandie Agglomération

Government
  - Mayor (2020–2026): Didier Courtat
- Area^{1}: 5.81 km^{2} (2.24 sq mi)
- Elevation: 102 m (335 ft)
- Highest elevation: 138 m (453 ft)
- Lowest elevation: 35 m (115 ft)
- Population (2023): 1,708
  - Density: 294/km^{2} (761/sq mi)
- Time zone: UTC+01:00 (CET)
  - Summer (DST): UTC+02:00 (CEST)
- INSEE/Postal code: 27397 /27120
- ^{1} French Land Register data, which excludes lakes, ponds, glaciers > 1 km^{2} (0.386 sq mi or 247 acres) and river estuaries.

Ménilles (French pronunciation: [menij]) is a commune in the Eure department in the Normandy region in northern France.

== Population ==
Historical population
Year	Pop.	±% p.a.
1968	909	—
1975	1,183	+3.84%
1982	1,248	+0.77%
1990	1,449	+1.88%
1999	1,382	−0.52%
2007	1,501	+1.04%
2012	1,560	+0.77%
2017	1,728	+2.07%
2023	1,708	−0.19%
Source: INSEE

== See also ==
- Communes of the Eure department
