= Vatteville =

- Commune
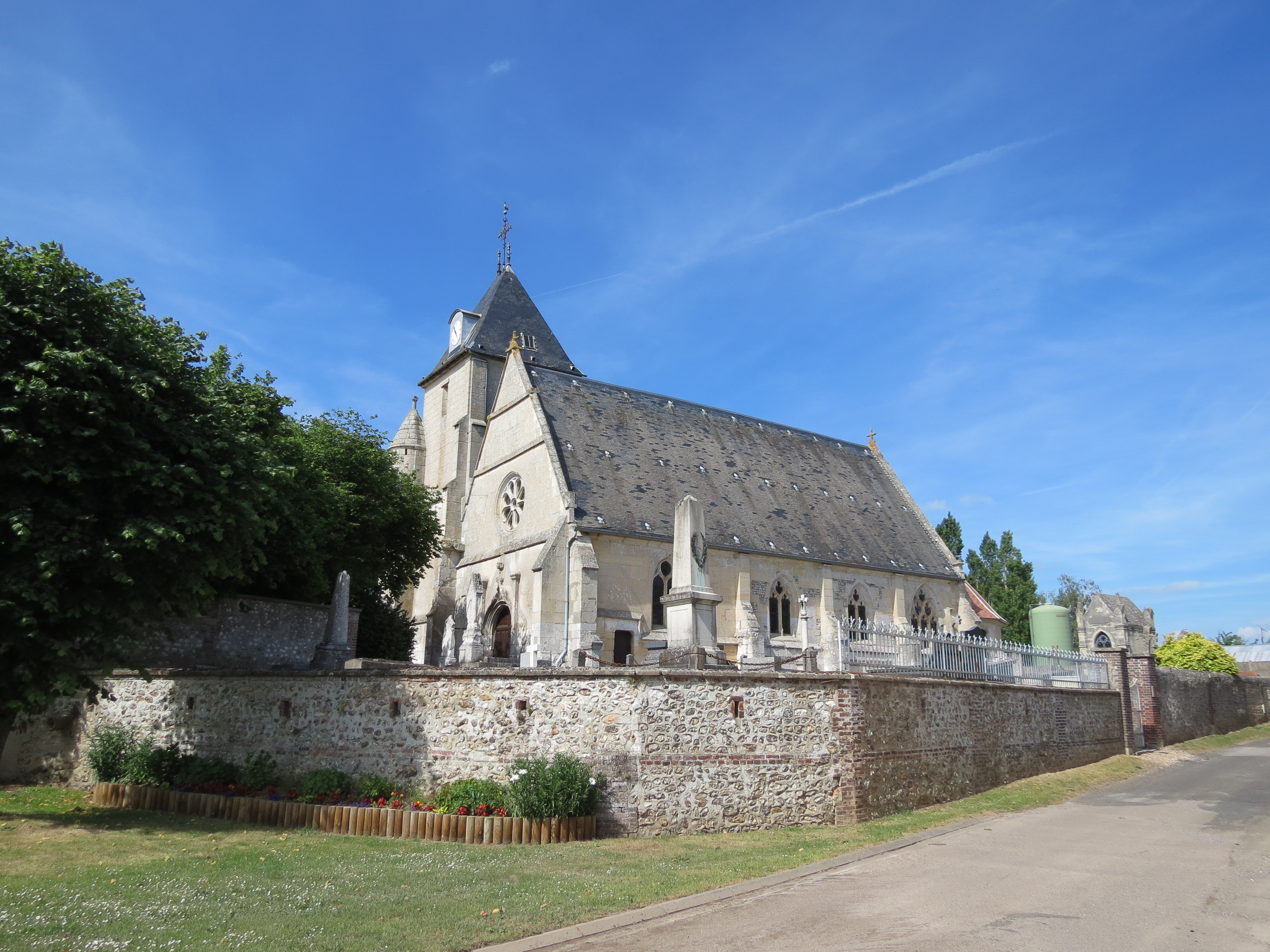
- The church in Vatteville
- Location of Vatteville
- Location within France Location within Normandy
- Coordinates: 49°16′36″N 1°17′44″E
- Country: France
- Region: Normandy
- Department: Eure
- Arrondissement: Les Andelys
- Canton: Les Andelys
- Intercommunality: Seine Normandie Agglomération

Government
  - Mayor (2020–2026): Laurent Legay
- Area^{1}: 4.27 km^{2} (1.65 sq mi)
- Elevation: 150 m (490 ft)
- Highest elevation: 151 m (495 ft)
- Lowest elevation: 7 m (23 ft)
- Population (2023): 175
  - Density: 41.0/km^{2} (106/sq mi)
- Time zone: UTC+01:00 (CET)
  - Summer (DST): UTC+02:00 (CEST)
- INSEE/Postal code: 27673 /27430
- ^{1} French Land Register data, which excludes lakes, ponds, glaciers > 1 km^{2} (0.386 sq mi or 247 acres) and river estuaries.

Vatteville (French pronunciation: [vatvil]) is a commune in the Eure department in Normandy in northern France.

The surname "Waterfield" originates from this town.

== Localisation ==
The neighbouring communes are Amfreville-sous-les-Monts, Connelles, Daubeuf-près-Vatteville, Heuqueville, and Porte-de-Seine.

== Hydrography ==
The commune lies within the Seine-Normandy basin and is drained by the Seine and several smaller watercourses. Two ponds complete the hydrographic network: the Mare Jumelle (0.05 ha) and the Deux Mares (0.03 ha).

== Population ==
Historical population
Year	Pop.	±% p.a.
1968	140	—
1975	110	−3.39%
1982	144	+3.92%
1990	166	+1.79%
1999	160	−0.41%
2007	177	+1.27%
2012	200	+2.47%
2017	182	−1.87%
2023	175	−0.65%
Source: INSEE

== See also ==
- Communes of the Eure department
