= Fresne-l'Archevêque =

- Part of Frenelles-en-Vexin
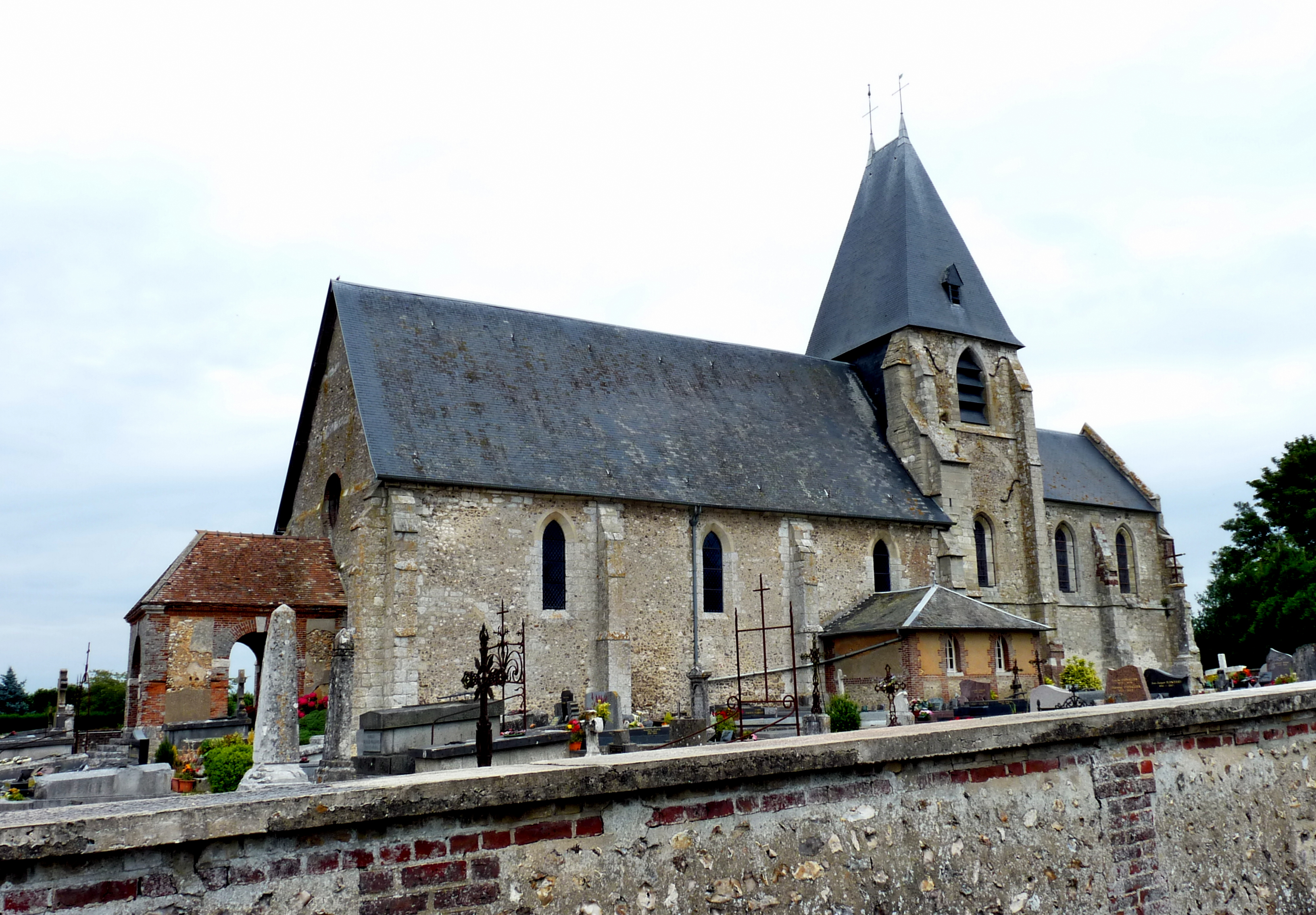
- The church in Fresne-l'Archevêque
- Location of Fresne-l'Archevêque
- Location within France Location within Normandy
- Coordinates: 49°17′24″N 1°24′24″E
- Country: France
- Region: Normandy
- Department: Eure
- Arrondissement: Les Andelys
- Canton: Les Andelys
- Commune: Frenelles-en-Vexin
- Area^{1}: 10.58 km^{2} (4.08 sq mi)
- Elevation: 140 m (460 ft)
- Highest elevation: 154 m (505 ft)
- Lowest elevation: 65 m (213 ft)
- Population (2023): 522
  - Density: 49.3/km^{2} (128/sq mi)
- Time zone: UTC+01:00 (CET)
  - Summer (DST): UTC+02:00 (CEST)
- Postal code: 27700
- ^{1} French Land Register data, which excludes lakes, ponds, glaciers > 1 km^{2} (0.386 sq mi or 247 acres) and river estuaries.

Fresne-l'Archevêque (French pronunciation: [fʁɛn laʁʃəvɛk]) is a former commune in the Eure department in the Normandy region in northern France. On 1 January 2019, it was merged into the new commune Frenelles-en-Vexin.

== See also ==
- Communes of the Eure department
