= Boisemont =

Boisemont is the name of several communes in France:

- Boisemont, Eure
- Boisemont, Val-d'Oise
