= Tournedos =

Tournedos can refer to:

- Tournedos, small round pieces of beef cut from the end portion of beef tenderloin, often cooked with bacon or lard
  - Tournedos Rossini, a dish using this cut
- Tournedos-Bois-Hubert, a commune in northern France
- Tournedos-sur-Seine, a small town in northern France
