= Corny, Eure =

Corny
- Part of Frenelles-en-Vexin
- Location of Corny
- Location within France Location within Normandy
- Coordinates: 49°16′59″N 1°27′31″E
- Country: France
- Region: Normandy
- Department: Eure
- Arrondissement: Les Andelys
- Canton: Les Andelys
- Commune: Frenelles-en-Vexin
- Area^{1}: 5.26 km^{2} (2.03 sq mi)
- Elevation: 146 m (479 ft)
- Highest elevation: 156 m (512 ft)
- Lowest elevation: 62 m (203 ft)
- Population (2023): 384
  - Density: 73.0/km^{2} (189/sq mi)
- Time zone: UTC+01:00 (CET)
  - Summer (DST): UTC+02:00 (CEST)
- Postal code: 27700
- ^{1} French Land Register data, which excludes lakes, ponds, glaciers > 1 km^{2} (0.386 sq mi or 247 acres) and river estuaries.

Corny (French pronunciation: [kɔʁni]) is a former commune in the Eure department in northern France. On 1 January 2019, it was merged into the new commune Frenelles-en-Vexin.

== See also ==
- Communes of the Eure department
