= Daubeuf-près-Vatteville =

- Commune
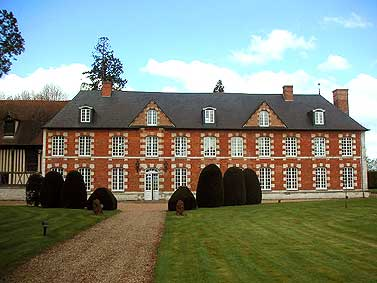
- Chateau of Daubeuf-de-Nanteuil

- Coat of arms
- Location of Daubeuf-près-Vatteville
- Location within France Location within Normandy
- Coordinates: 49°16′08″N 1°18′13″E
- Country: France
- Region: Normandy
- Department: Eure
- Arrondissement: Les Andelys
- Canton: Les Andelys
- Intercommunality: Seine Normandie Agglomération

Government
  - Mayor (2020–2026): Serge Colombel
- Area^{1}: 11.35 km^{2} (4.38 sq mi)
- Elevation: 144 m (472 ft)
- Highest elevation: 141 m (463 ft)
- Lowest elevation: 23 m (75 ft)
- Population (2023): 460
  - Density: 41/km^{2} (100/sq mi)
- Time zone: UTC+01:00 (CET)
  - Summer (DST): UTC+02:00 (CEST)
- INSEE/Postal code: 27202 /27430
- ^{1} French Land Register data, which excludes lakes, ponds, glaciers > 1 km^{2} (0.386 sq mi or 247 acres) and river estuaries.

Daubeuf-près-Vatteville (French pronunciation: [dobœf pʁɛ vatvil], literally Daubeuf near Vatteville) is a commune in the Eure department in northern France.

== Population ==
Historical population
Year	Pop.	±% p.a.
1968	337	—
1975	296	−1.84%
1982	307	+0.52%
1990	393	+3.14%
1999	425	+0.87%
2007	466	+1.16%
2012	483	+0.72%
2017	468	−0.63%
2023	460	−0.29%
Source: INSEE

== See also ==
- Communes of the Eure department
