= Boisemont, Eure =

Boisemont
- Part of Frenelles-en-Vexin
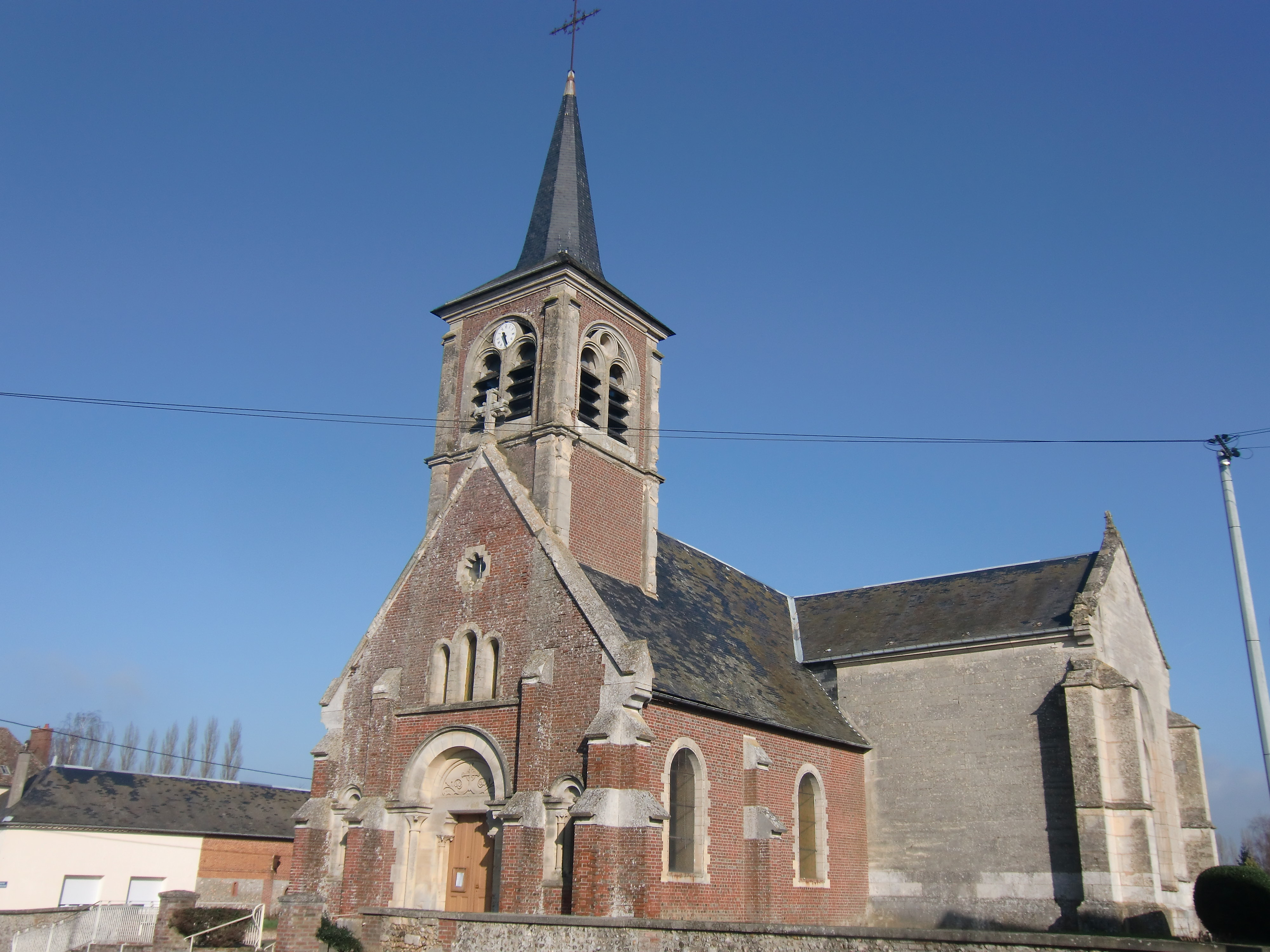
- The church in Boisemont
- Location of Boisemont
- Location within France Location within Normandy
- Coordinates: 49°17′13″N 1°30′04″E
- Country: France
- Region: Normandy
- Department: Eure
- Arrondissement: Les Andelys
- Canton: Les Andelys
- Commune: Frenelles-en-Vexin
- Area^{1}: 13.22 km^{2} (5.10 sq mi)
- Elevation: 148 m (486 ft)
- Highest elevation: 156 m (512 ft)
- Lowest elevation: 90 m (300 ft)
- Population (2023): 780
  - Density: 59/km^{2} (150/sq mi)
- Time zone: UTC+01:00 (CET)
  - Summer (DST): UTC+02:00 (CEST)
- Postal code: 27150
- ^{1} French Land Register data, which excludes lakes, ponds, glaciers > 1 km^{2} (0.386 sq mi or 247 acres) and river estuaries.

Boisemont (French pronunciation: [bwazmɔ̃]) is a former commune in the Eure department in Normandy in northern France. On 1 January 2019, it was merged into the new commune Frenelles-en-Vexin.

== See also ==
- Communes of the Eure department
