= La Roquette =

- Commune
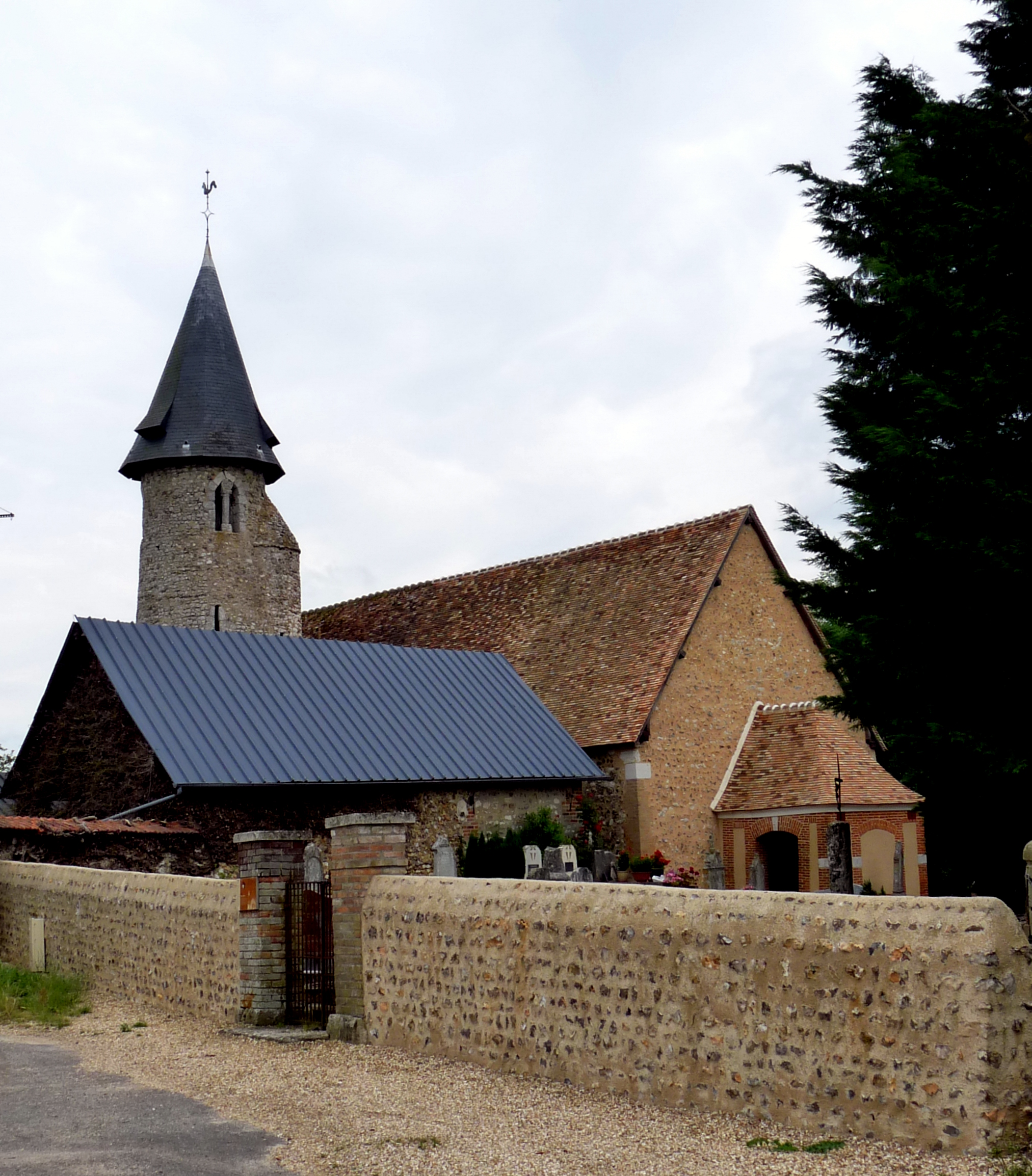
- The church in La Roquette
- Location of La Roquette
- Location within France Location within Normandy
- Coordinates: 49°15′09″N 1°20′43″E
- Country: France
- Region: Normandy
- Department: Eure
- Arrondissement: Les Andelys
- Canton: Les Andelys
- Intercommunality: Seine Normandie Agglomération

Government
  - Mayor (2020–2026): Christophe Bastianelli
- Area^{1}: 5.9 km^{2} (2.3 sq mi)
- Elevation: 164 m (538 ft)
- Highest elevation: 144 m (472 ft)
- Lowest elevation: 7 m (23 ft)
- Population (2023): 233
  - Density: 39/km^{2} (100/sq mi)
- Time zone: UTC+01:00 (CET)
  - Summer (DST): UTC+02:00 (CEST)
- INSEE/Postal code: 27495 /27700
- ^{1} French Land Register data, which excludes lakes, ponds, glaciers > 1 km^{2} (0.386 sq mi or 247 acres) and river estuaries.

La Roquette (French pronunciation: [la ʁɔkɛt]) is a commune in the Eure department in northern France.

== Population ==
Historical population
Year	Pop.	±% p.a.
1968	70	—
1975	108	+6.39%
1982	126	+2.23%
1990	204	+6.21%
1999	189	−0.84%
2007	221	+1.97%
2012	239	+1.58%
2017	238	−0.08%
2023	233	−0.35%
Source: INSEE

== See also ==
- Communes of the Eure department
