= Heubécourt-Haricourt =

- Commune
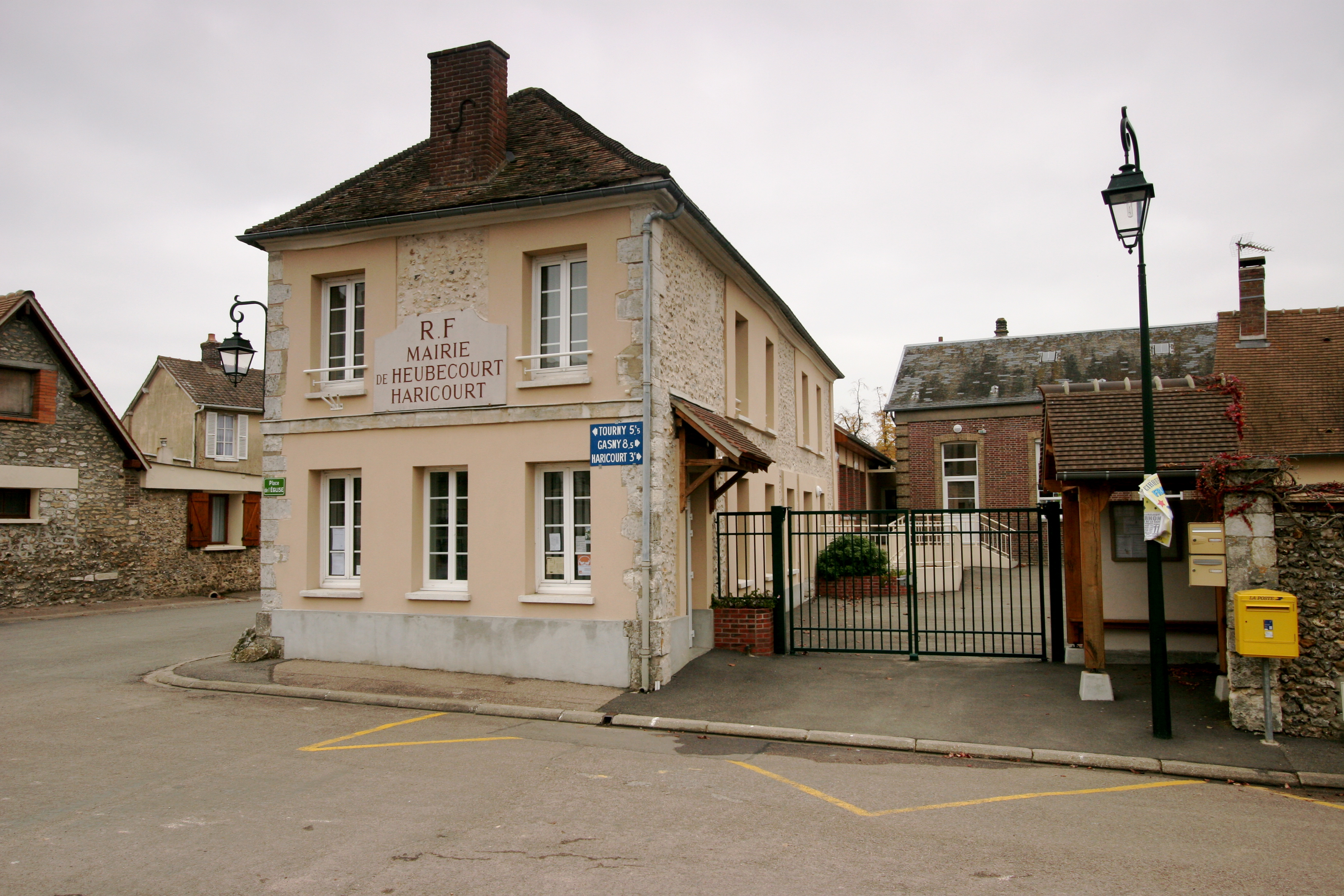
- The town hall in Heubécourt-Haricourt
- Location of Heubécourt-Haricourt
- Location within France Location within Normandy
- Coordinates: 49°08′14″N 1°33′44″E
- Country: France
- Region: Normandy
- Department: Eure
- Arrondissement: Les Andelys
- Canton: Les Andelys
- Intercommunality: Seine Normandie Agglomération

Government
  - Mayor (2020–2026): Jean-Marie Motte
- Area^{1}: 11.92 km^{2} (4.60 sq mi)
- Elevation: 141 m (463 ft)
- Highest elevation: 156 m (512 ft)
- Lowest elevation: 77 m (253 ft)
- Population (2023): 463
  - Density: 38.8/km^{2} (101/sq mi)
- Time zone: UTC+01:00 (CET)
  - Summer (DST): UTC+02:00 (CEST)
- INSEE/Postal code: 27331 /27630
- ^{1} French Land Register data, which excludes lakes, ponds, glaciers > 1 km^{2} (0.386 sq mi or 247 acres) and river estuaries.

Heubécourt-Haricourt (French pronunciation: [øbekuʁ aʁikuʁ]) is a commune in the Eure department in north-western France.

== Population ==
Historical population
Year	Pop.	±% p.a.
1968	267	—
1975	303	+1.82%
1982	328	+1.14%
1990	416	+3.02%
1999	401	−0.41%
2007	443	+1.25%
2012	452	+0.40%
2017	464	+0.53%
2023	463	−0.04%
Source: INSEE

== See also ==
- Communes of the Eure department
