= Muids =

- Commune
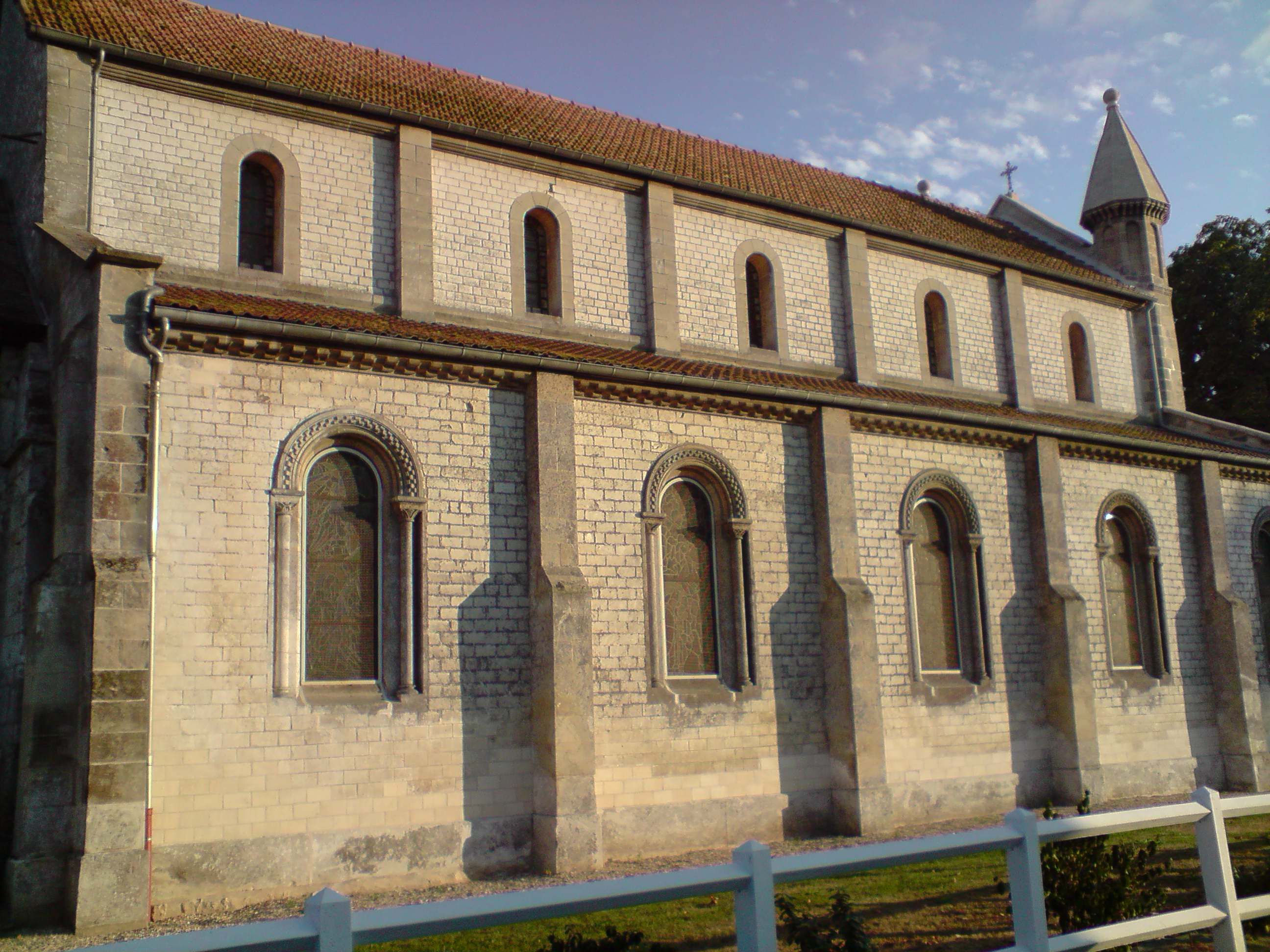
- The church in Muids

- Coat of arms
- Location of Muids
- Location within France Location within Normandy
- Coordinates: 49°13′23″N 1°17′29″E
- Country: France
- Region: Normandy
- Department: Eure
- Arrondissement: Les Andelys
- Canton: Les Andelys
- Intercommunality: Seine Normandie Agglomération

Government
  - Mayor (2020–2026): Bernard Leboucq
- Area^{1}: 15.22 km^{2} (5.88 sq mi)
- Elevation: 25 m (82 ft)
- Highest elevation: 76 m (249 ft)
- Lowest elevation: 7 m (23 ft)
- Population (2023): 861
  - Density: 56.6/km^{2} (147/sq mi)
- Time zone: UTC+01:00 (CET)
  - Summer (DST): UTC+02:00 (CEST)
- INSEE/Postal code: 27422 /27430
- ^{1} French Land Register data, which excludes lakes, ponds, glaciers > 1 km^{2} (0.386 sq mi or 247 acres) and river estuaries.

Muids (French pronunciation: [mɥi]) is a commune in the Eure department in Normandy in northern France.

== Population ==
Historical population
Year	Pop.	±% p.a.
1968	546	—
1975	597	+1.28%
1982	733	+2.98%
1990	795	+1.02%
1999	828	+0.45%
2007	894	+0.96%
2012	848	−1.05%
2017	871	+0.54%
2023	861	−0.19%
Source: INSEE

== See also ==
- Communes of the Eure department

== Images ==
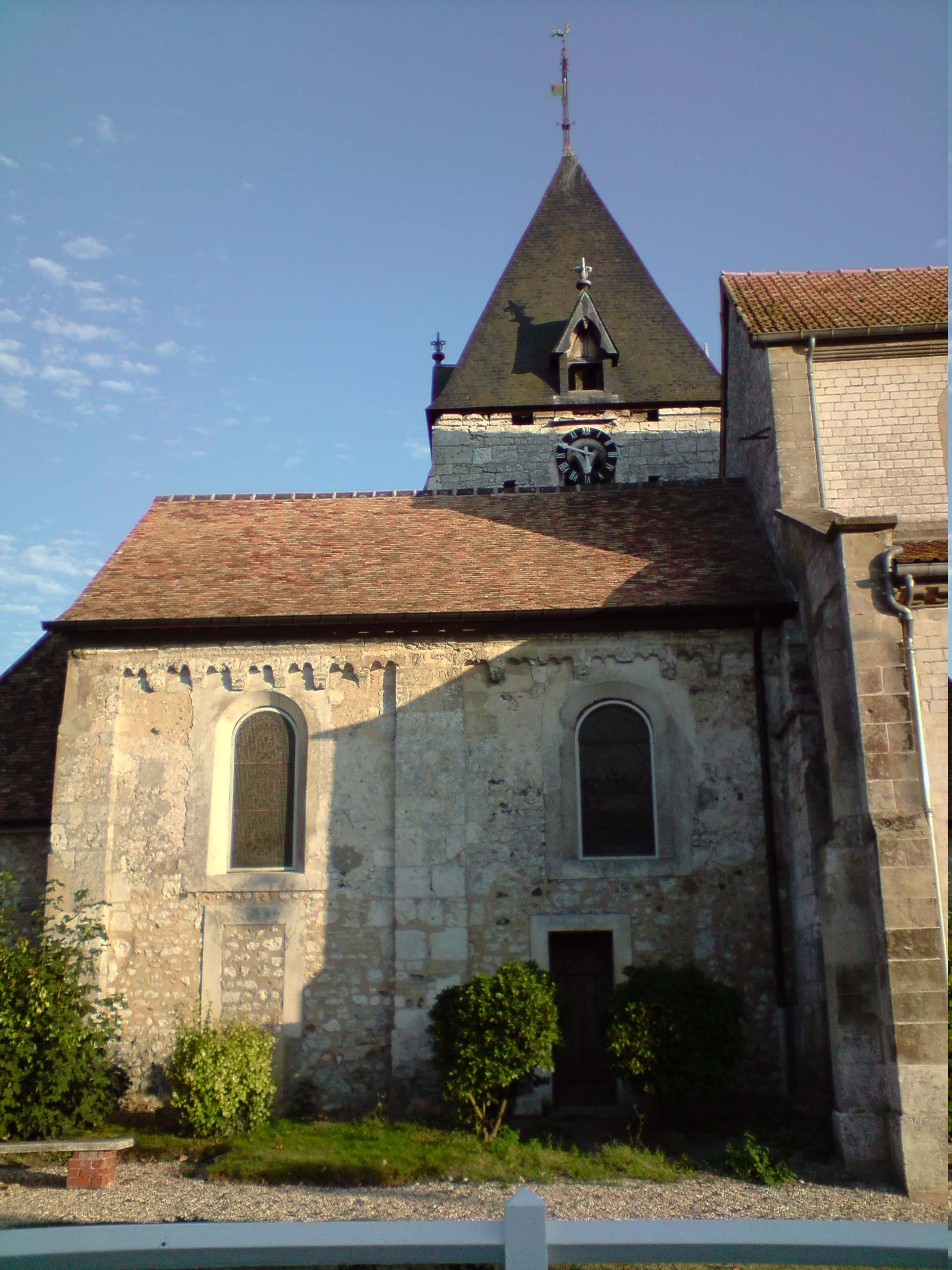

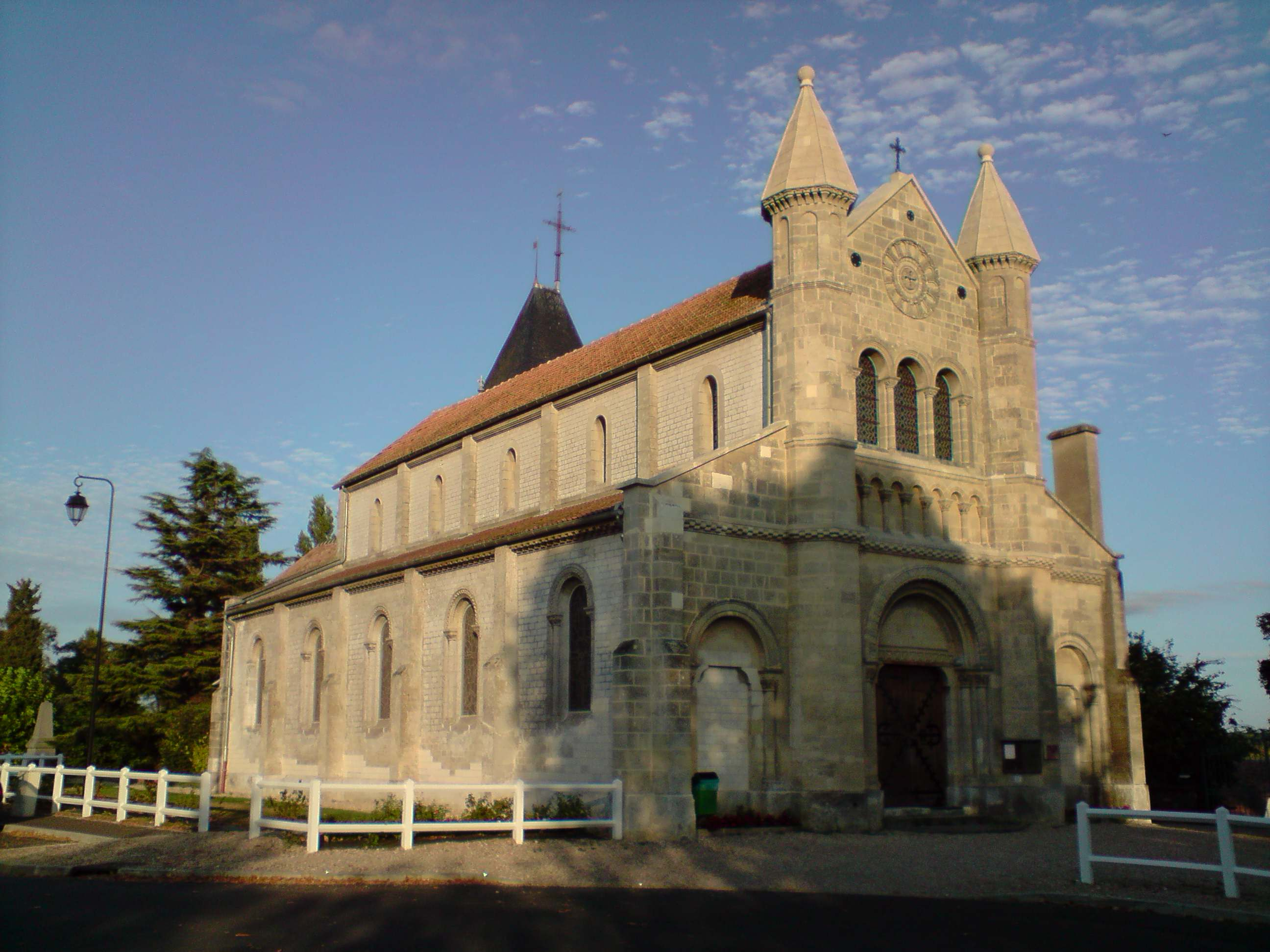

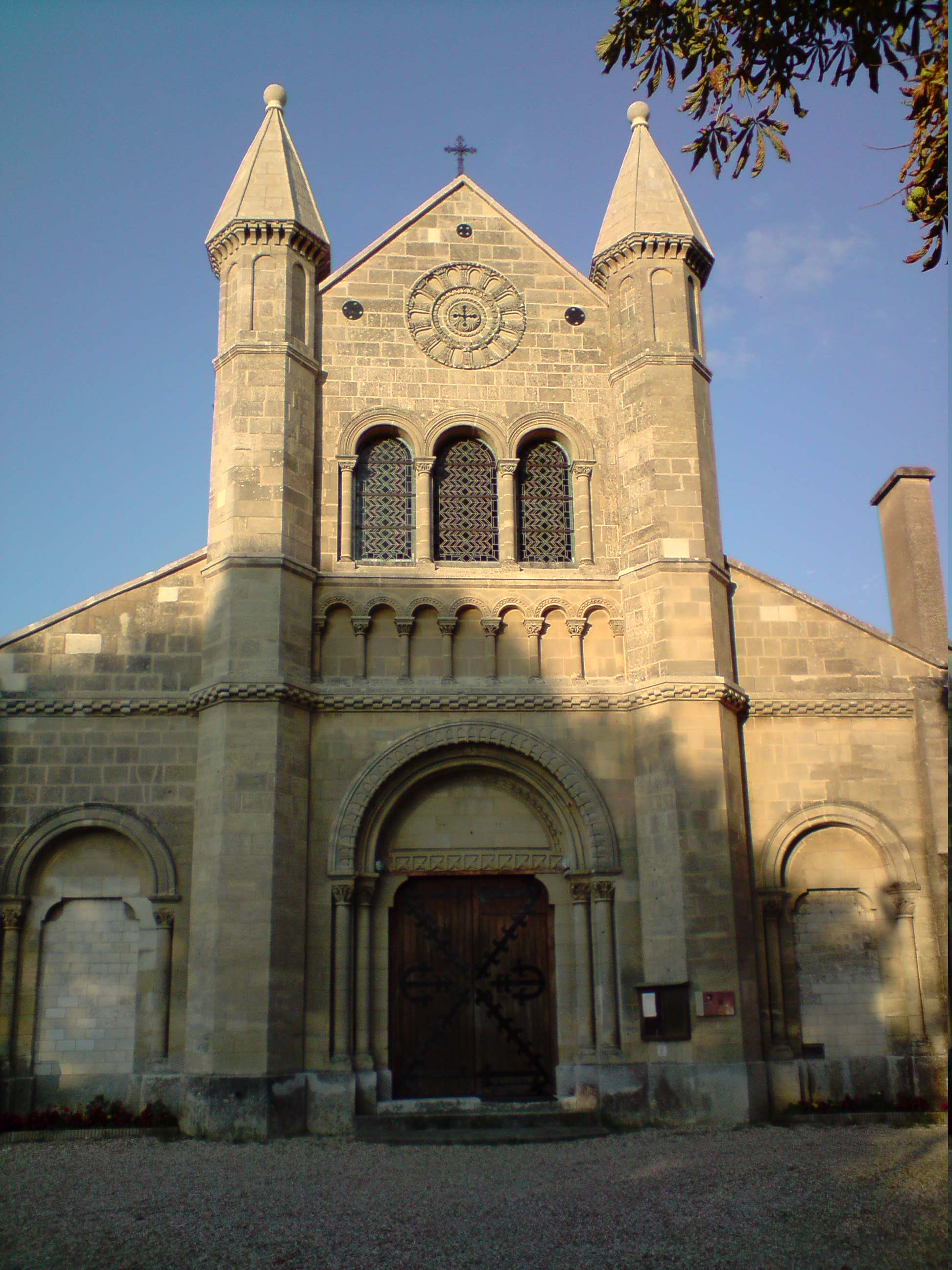
