= Porte-Joie =

- Part of Porte-de-Seine
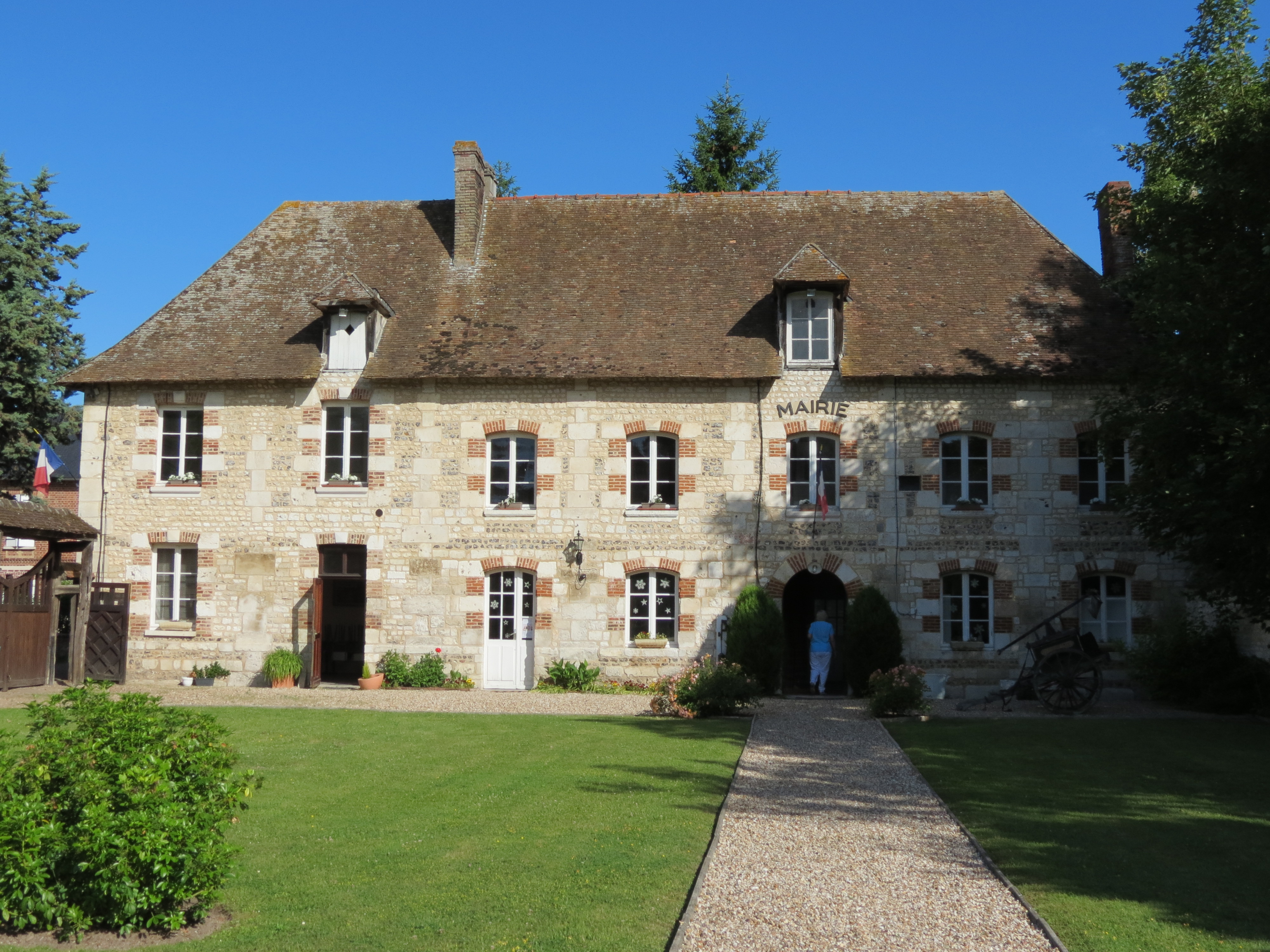
- Town hall
- Location of Porte-Joie
- Location within France Location within Normandy
- Coordinates: 49°14′47″N 1°15′20″E
- Country: France
- Region: Normandy
- Department: Eure
- Arrondissement: Les Andelys
- Canton: Val-de-Reuil
- Commune: Porte-de-Seine
- Area^{1}: 5.91 km^{2} (2.28 sq mi)
- Elevation: 11 m (36 ft)
- Highest elevation: 11 m (36 ft)
- Lowest elevation: 7 m (23 ft)
- Population (2023): 101
  - Density: 17.1/km^{2} (44.3/sq mi)
- Time zone: UTC+01:00 (CET)
  - Summer (DST): UTC+02:00 (CEST)
- Postal code: 27430
- ^{1} French Land Register data, which excludes lakes, ponds, glaciers > 1 km^{2} (0.386 sq mi or 247 acres) and river estuaries.

Porte-Joie (French pronunciation: [pɔʁt ʒwa]) is a former commune in the Eure department in Normandy in northern France. On 1 January 2018, it was merged into the new commune of Porte-de-Seine.

== See also ==
- Communes of the Eure department
