= Vézillon =

- Commune
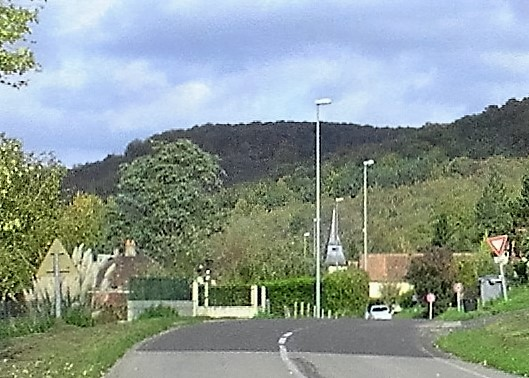
- A road in Vézillon
- Location of Vézillon
- Location within France Location within Normandy
- Coordinates: 49°13′37″N 1°24′03″E
- Country: France
- Region: Normandy
- Department: Eure
- Arrondissement: Les Andelys
- Canton: Les Andelys
- Intercommunality: Seine Normandie Agglomération

Government
  - Mayor (2020–2026): Jean-Pierre Taullé
- Area^{1}: 2.04 km^{2} (0.79 sq mi)
- Elevation: 16 m (52 ft)
- Highest elevation: 145 m (476 ft)
- Lowest elevation: 9 m (30 ft)
- Population (2023): 231
  - Density: 113/km^{2} (293/sq mi)
- Time zone: UTC+01:00 (CET)
  - Summer (DST): UTC+02:00 (CEST)
- INSEE/Postal code: 27683 /27700
- ^{1} French Land Register data, which excludes lakes, ponds, glaciers > 1 km^{2} (0.386 sq mi or 247 acres) and river estuaries.

Vézillon (French pronunciation: [vezijɔ̃]) is a commune in the Eure department and Normandy region of France.

== Population ==
Historical population
Year	Pop.	±% p.a.
1968	117	—
1975	127	+1.18%
1982	138	+1.19%
1990	181	+3.45%
1999	214	+1.88%
2007	239	+1.39%
2012	252	+1.06%
2017	251	−0.08%
2023	231	−1.37%
Source: INSEE

== See also ==
- Communes of the Eure department
