= Suzay =

- Commune
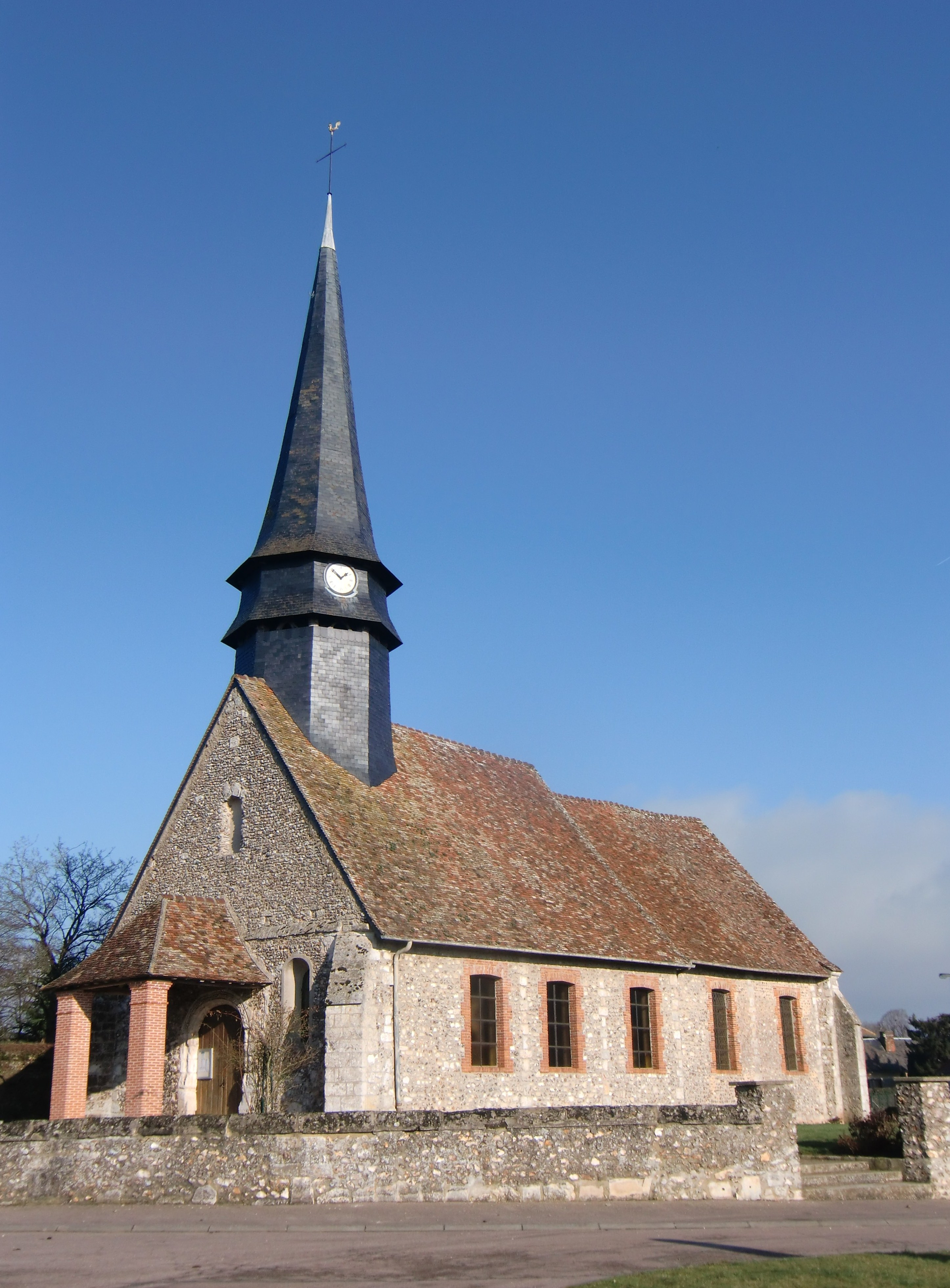
- The church in Suzay

- Coat of arms
- Location of Suzay
- Location within France Location within Normandy
- Coordinates: 49°16′24″N 1°31′01″E
- Country: France
- Region: Normandy
- Department: Eure
- Arrondissement: Les Andelys
- Canton: Les Andelys
- Intercommunality: Seine Normandie Agglomération

Government
  - Mayor (2020–2026): Agnès Marre
- Area^{1}: 4.11 km^{2} (1.59 sq mi)
- Elevation: 148 m (486 ft)
- Highest elevation: 148 m (486 ft)
- Lowest elevation: 65 m (213 ft)
- Population (2023): 343
  - Density: 83.5/km^{2} (216/sq mi)
- Time zone: UTC+01:00 (CET)
  - Summer (DST): UTC+02:00 (CEST)
- INSEE/Postal code: 27625 /27420
- ^{1} French Land Register data, which excludes lakes, ponds, glaciers > 1 km^{2} (0.386 sq mi or 247 acres) and river estuaries.

Suzay (French pronunciation: [suzɛ]) is a commune in the Eure department in Normandy in northern France.

== Population ==
Historical population
Year	Pop.	±% p.a.
1968	125	—
1975	118	−0.82%
1982	138	+2.26%
1990	175	+3.01%
1999	206	+1.83%
2007	237	+1.77%
2012	311	+5.59%
2017	351	+2.45%
2023	343	−0.38%
Source: INSEE

== See also ==
- Communes of the Eure department
