= Mézières-en-Vexin =

- Commune
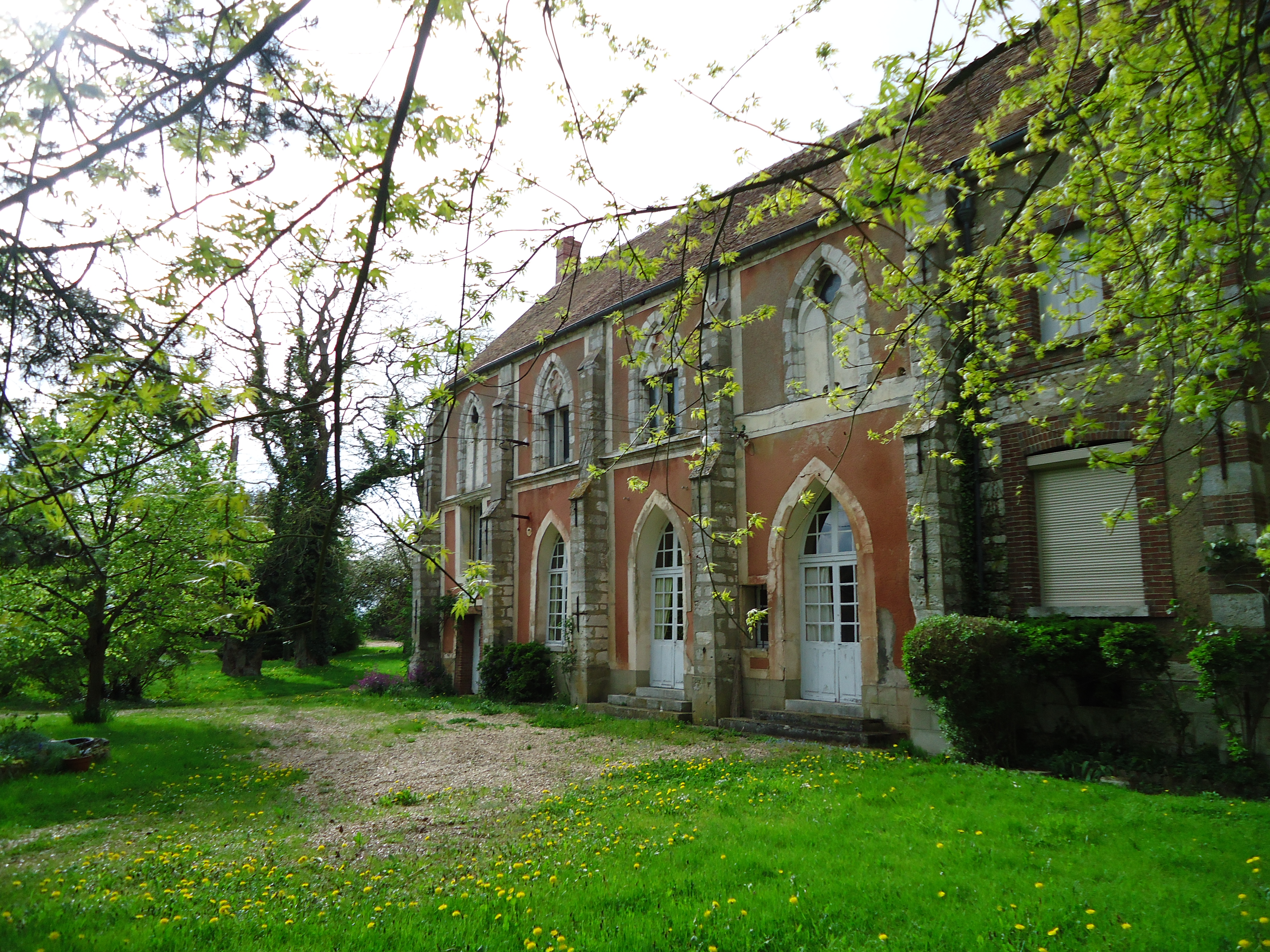
- The manor of Surcy in Mézières-en-Vexin
- Location of Mézières-en-Vexin
- Location within France Location within Normandy
- Coordinates: 49°10′16″N 1°30′22″E
- Country: France
- Region: Normandy
- Department: Eure
- Arrondissement: Les Andelys
- Canton: Les Andelys
- Intercommunality: Seine Normandie Agglomération

Government
  - Mayor (2020–2026): Hubert Pineau
- Area^{1}: 12.7 km^{2} (4.9 sq mi)
- Highest elevation: 162 m (531 ft)
- Lowest elevation: 60 m (200 ft)
- Population (2023): 607
  - Density: 47.8/km^{2} (124/sq mi)
- Time zone: UTC+01:00 (CET)
  - Summer (DST): UTC+02:00 (CEST)
- INSEE/Postal code: 27408 /27510
- ^{1} French Land Register data, which excludes lakes, ponds, glaciers > 1 km^{2} (0.386 sq mi or 247 acres) and river estuaries.

Mézières-en-Vexin (French pronunciation: [mezjɛʁ ɑ̃ vɛksɛ̃], literally Mézières in Vexin) is a commune in the Eure department and Normandy region of France.

== See also ==
- Communes of the Eure department
