= Cuverville, Eure =

Cuverville
- Commune
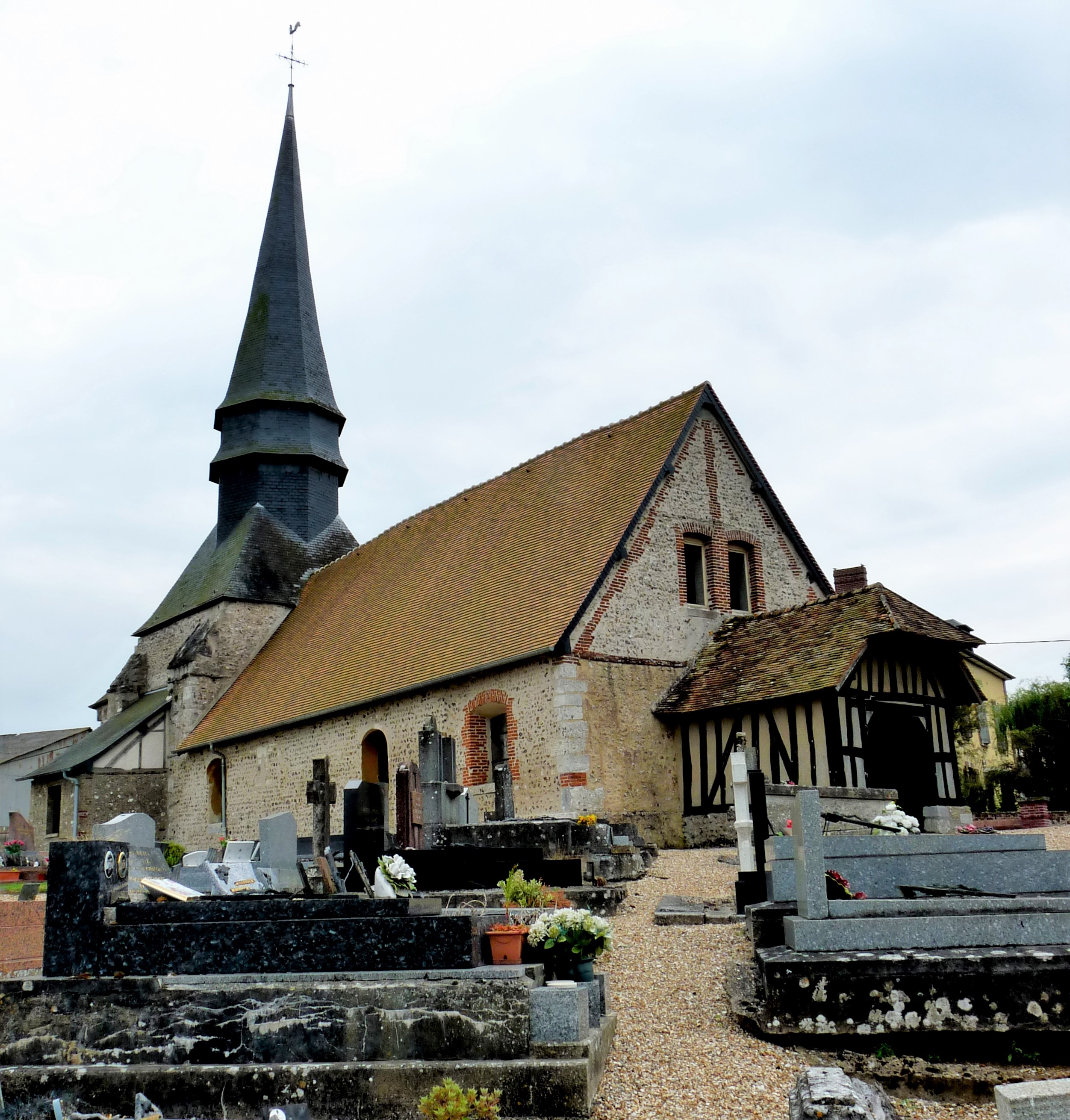
- The church in Cuverville
- Location of Cuverville
- Location within France Location within Normandy
- Coordinates: 49°17′13″N 1°22′22″E
- Country: France
- Region: Normandy
- Department: Eure
- Arrondissement: Les Andelys
- Canton: Les Andelys
- Intercommunality: Seine Normandie Agglomération

Government
  - Mayor (2020–2026): Gilles Le Moal
- Area^{1}: 6.17 km^{2} (2.38 sq mi)
- Elevation: 150 m (490 ft)
- Highest elevation: 158 m (518 ft)
- Lowest elevation: 64 m (210 ft)
- Population (2023): 248
  - Density: 40.2/km^{2} (104/sq mi)
- Time zone: UTC+01:00 (CET)
  - Summer (DST): UTC+02:00 (CEST)
- INSEE/Postal code: 27194 /27700
- ^{1} French Land Register data, which excludes lakes, ponds, glaciers > 1 km^{2} (0.386 sq mi or 247 acres) and river estuaries.

Cuverville (French pronunciation: [kyvɛʁvil]) is a commune in the Eure department of northern France.

== Population ==
Historical population
Year	Pop.	±% p.a.
1968	160	—
1975	138	−2.09%
1982	126	−1.29%
1990	144	+1.68%
1999	160	+1.18%
2007	189	+2.10%
2012	232	+4.19%
2017	248	+1.34%
2023	248	+0.00%
Source: INSEE

== See also ==
- Communes of the Eure department
