= Tilly, Eure =

Tilly
- Commune
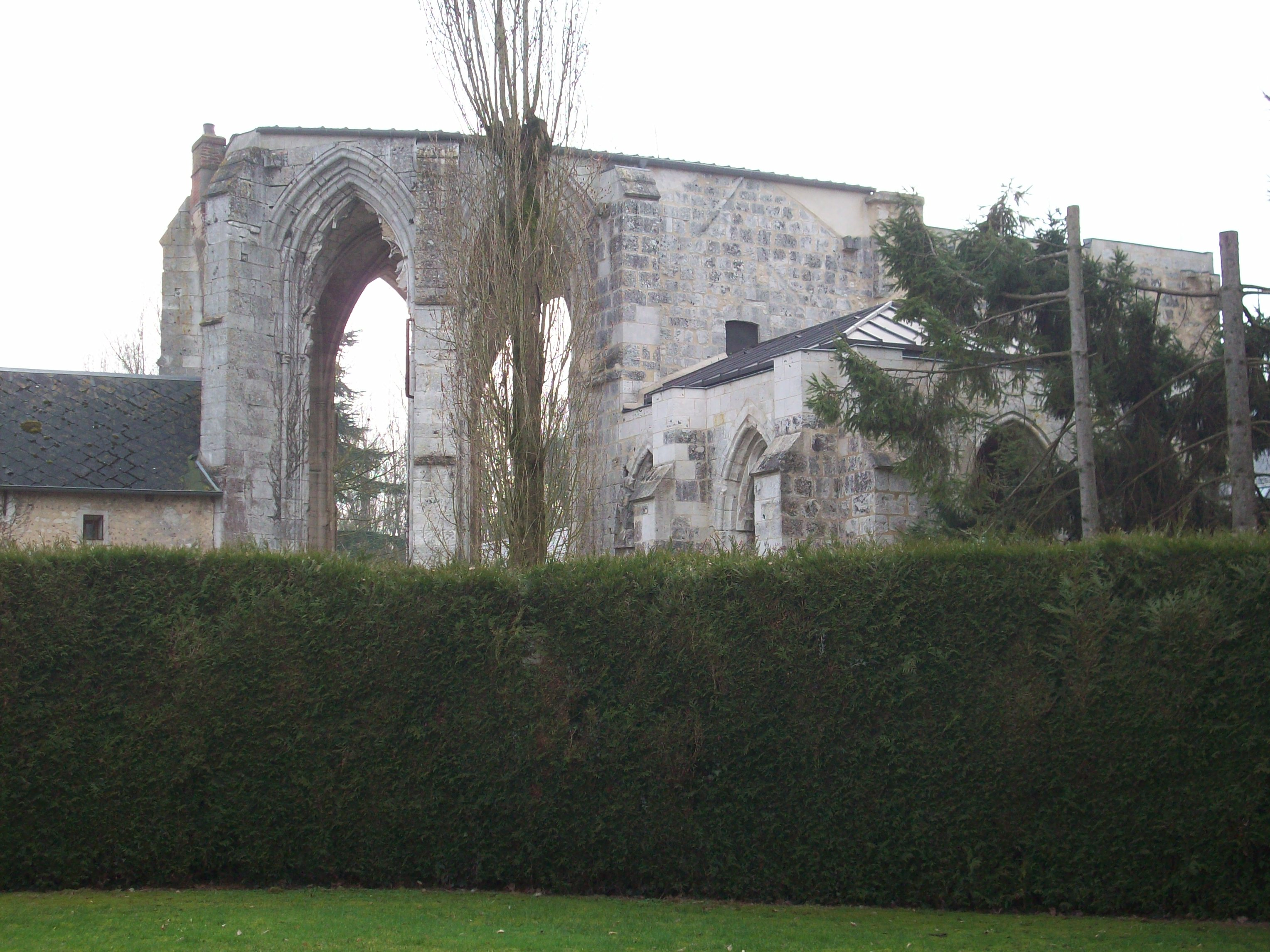
- Ruins of the priory of Salseuse

- Coat of arms
- Location of Tilly
- Location within France Location within Normandy
- Coordinates: 49°08′45″N 1°31′43″E
- Country: France
- Region: Normandy
- Department: Eure
- Arrondissement: Les Andelys
- Canton: Les Andelys
- Intercommunality: Seine Normandie Agglomération

Government
  - Mayor (2020–2026): Patrick Jourdain
- Area^{1}: 12.19 km^{2} (4.71 sq mi)
- Elevation: 144 m (472 ft)
- Highest elevation: 156 m (512 ft)
- Lowest elevation: 50 m (160 ft)
- Population (2023): 578
  - Density: 47.4/km^{2} (123/sq mi)
- Time zone: UTC+01:00 (CET)
  - Summer (DST): UTC+02:00 (CEST)
- INSEE/Postal code: 27644 /27510
- ^{1} French Land Register data, which excludes lakes, ponds, glaciers > 1 km^{2} (0.386 sq mi or 247 acres) and river estuaries.

Tilly is a commune in the Eure department in Normandy in northern France.

== Population ==
Historical population
Year	Pop.	±% p.a.
1968	239	—
1975	270	+1.76%
1982	383	+5.12%
1990	457	+2.23%
1999	457	+0.00%
2007	536	+2.01%
2012	565	+1.06%
2017	547	−0.65%
2023	578	+0.92%
Source: INSEE

== See also ==
- Communes of the Eure department
