= Frenelles-en-Vexin =

- Commune
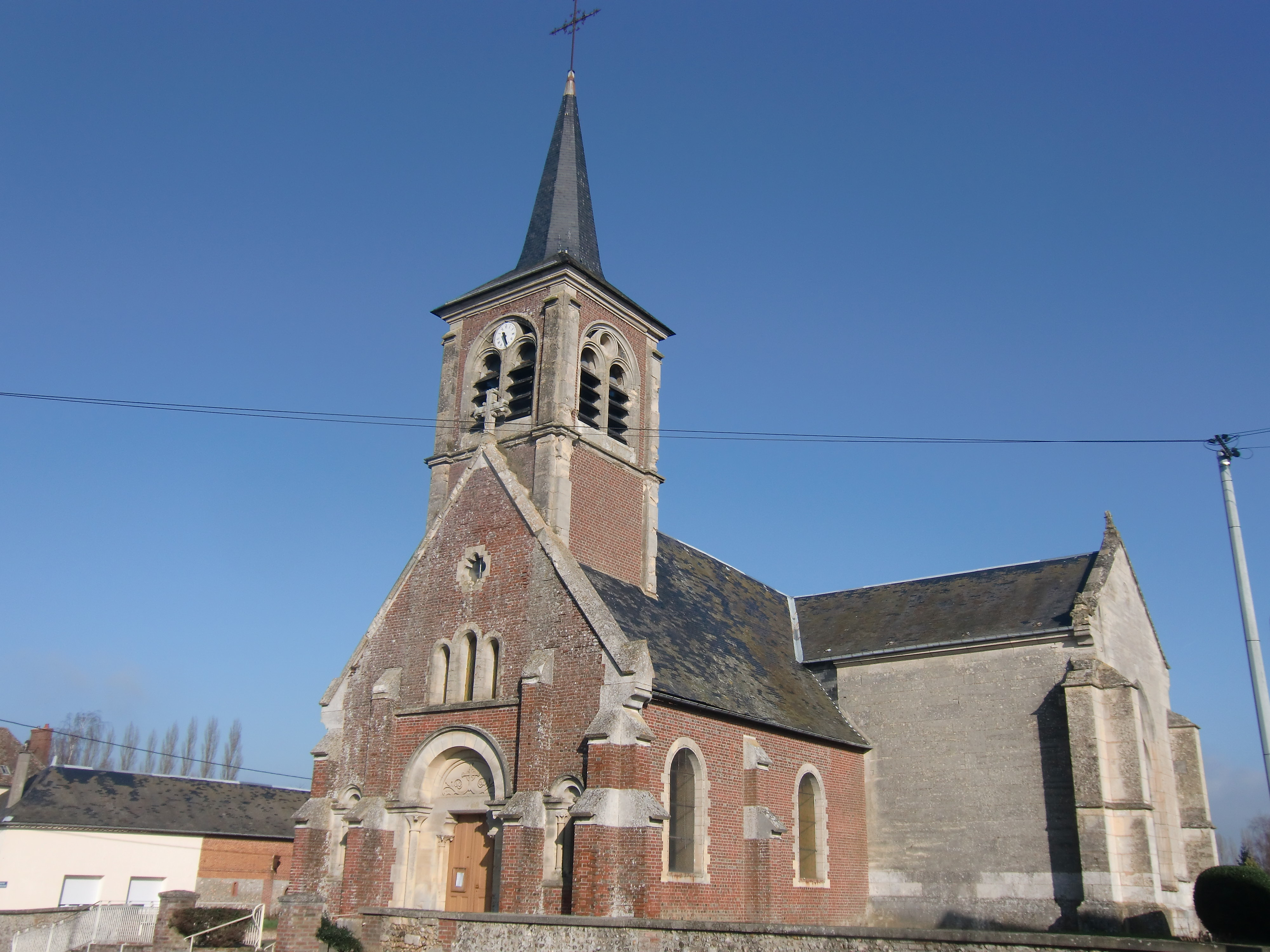
- The church in Boisemont
- Location of Frenelles-en-Vexin
- Location within France Location within Normandy
- Coordinates: 49°17′13″N 1°30′04″E
- Country: France
- Region: Normandy
- Department: Eure
- Arrondissement: Les Andelys
- Canton: Les Andelys
- Intercommunality: Seine Normandie Agglomération
- Area^{1}: 29.06 km^{2} (11.22 sq mi)
- Highest elevation: 156 m (512 ft)
- Lowest elevation: 62 m (203 ft)
- Population (2023): 1,686
  - Density: 58.02/km^{2} (150.3/sq mi)
- Time zone: UTC+01:00 (CET)
  - Summer (DST): UTC+02:00 (CEST)
- INSEE/Postal code: 27070 /27150
- ^{1} French Land Register data, which excludes lakes, ponds, glaciers > 1 km^{2} (0.386 sq mi or 247 acres) and river estuaries.

Frenelles-en-Vexin is a commune in the Eure department in Normandy in northern France. It was established on 1 January 2019 by merger of the former communes of Boisemont (the seat), Corny and Fresne-l'Archevêque.

== See also ==
- Communes of the Eure department
