= Château-sur-Epte Castle =

Ruined castle in Château-sur-Epte in the Eure department of France

Coordinates: 49°11′52″N 1°39′43″E

Châteauneuf-sur-Epte Castle
- Châteauneuf-sur-Epte (French)
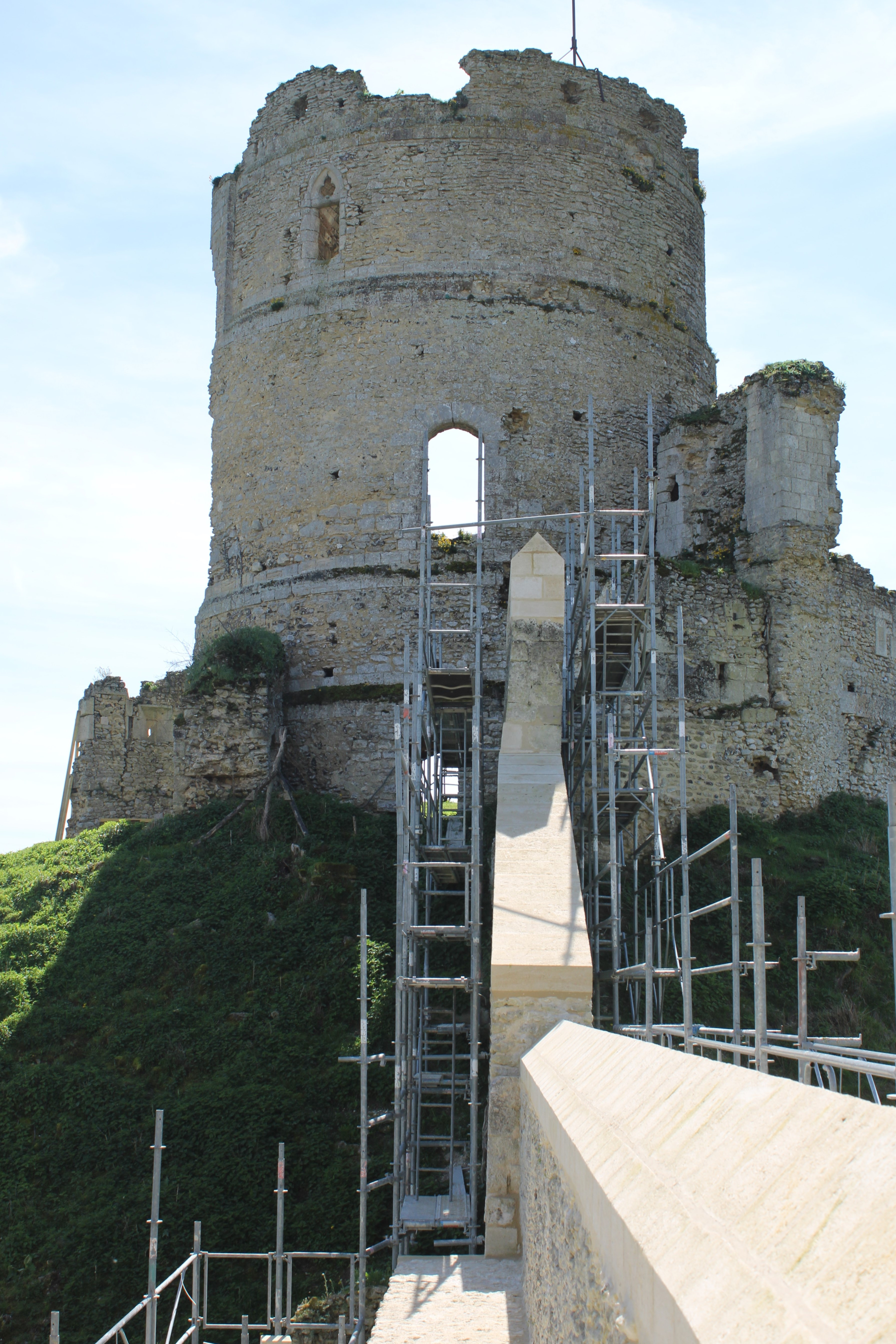
- Interactive map of the Châteauneuf-sur-Epte Castle area

General information
- Architectural style: Motte-and-bailey castle
- Location: Château-sur-Epte, France
- Year built: 1097; 929 years ago
- Renovated: Ongoing
- Owner: Héritage Historique association

Website
- http://www.chateaunormand.fr/

Monument historique
- Official name: Châteauneuf-sur-Epte
- Designated: 1998/06/16
- Reference no.: PA00099372
- Denomination: Ensemble castral

The ruined castle of Châteauneuf-sur-Epte is in the commune of Château-sur-Epte in the Eure department of France.

The ruins are owned by the Héritage Historique association, which has been restoring it since 2015. It has been listed since 1998 as a monument historique by the French Ministry of Culture.

== Location ==
The remains of the castle stand on the edge of the Vexin plateau in Normandy, in the village of Château-sur-Epte (French department of Eure). Situated downstream of Gisors, the castle watched over both the Franco-Norman border and its crossing, a short distance away, by the road from Paris to Rouen.

== History ==
=== Foundation ===
Building begun in 1097 by William Rufus, King of England, to reinforce the frontier along the Epte River. The castle occupied a site on the border between the Duchy of Normandy and the Kingdom of France.

In 1119, Louis VI the Fat besieged the castle. On the fifteenth day of siege, learning that Henry I had burnt the town of Évreux, he left the siege in a hurry, leaving only the burning huts of his soldiers behind. The castle was defended by Gautier Riblard, as recounted in this passage written in 1612:

"Meanwhile, Louis the Fat besieged the Château de Dangu [...]. When Dangu was burnt down, the Fat took his arms to Neuchaftel [Château-sur-Epte], which Guillaume the Red had had built at Faufelmont [Fuscelmont] near the Epte. This plan was not fortunate, as Captain Gautier Riblard and his soldiers resisted him generously and shot him with arrows. Fifteen days had passed in these exercises of March, when the Gros heard of the misfortune of Évreux and [...] lifts the siege & returns to France to raise new forces [...]."

In August 1151, Henry II Planagenet, then Duke of Normandy, transferred the Vexin to Louis VII. Among the castles and fortresses in this area was Châteauneuf-sur-Epte. Louis VII donated the site to the Abbey of Saint Denis in 1153. The purpose of this donation was to remove the castle from the influence of the bishopric of Rouen, which was then under the influence of the King of England. In 1153, Louis VII granted the village around the castle the right to hold a market every Friday. According to Laurence Bougant, the aim of this favour was "to give importance to this stronghold and allow the village to prosper", proving "the political importance of Château-sur-Epte allowed by its strategic position as a frontier castle".

Built from limestone, the castle was reinforced by the Plantagenets in the 12th century (keep and entry) and again during the Hundred Years' War. Other works were carried out in the 14th century.

In 1437, it was captured by John Talbot, 1st Earl of Shrewsbury.

=== Decline ===
The castle's role declined in the 16th century and it was ordered to be dismantled by Mazarin in 1647. Transformed into an agricultural centre under the Ancien Régime, it comprised a motte with a stone keep, a lower court linked to the motte and defended by a curtain wall flanked in the east and west by two fortified gateways (14th century), a drawbridge and, in the lower court, a medieval barn, a 17th-century corps de logis and a dovecote. The condition of the site deteriorated.

=== 20th century ===
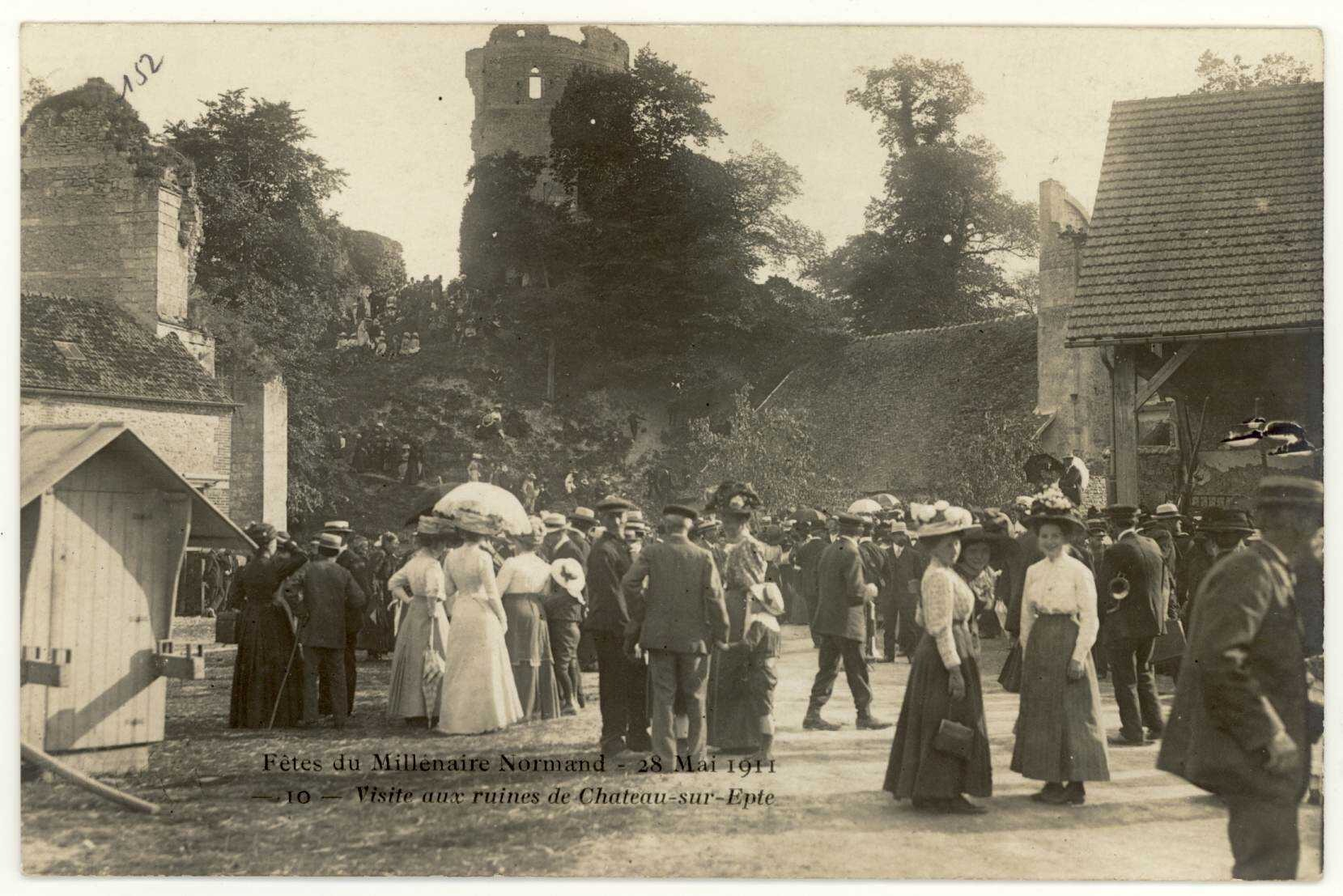
Visit to the ruins of Château-sur-Epte, 28 May 1911

In 1911, the Normandy region celebrated the 1,000th anniversary of the founding of the Duchy of Normandy by the Treaty of Saint-Clair-sur-Epte by organising the 'Norman Millennium Festivities'. In Saint-Clair-sur-Epte, the festivities began on the 28th of May 1911 and were attended by 420 Normans from the region and Paris as well as several representatives and mayors, including the mayor of Château-sur-Epte, Mr Hervé. The events began with a speech and a banquet, followed by the unveiling of a plaque in Saint-Clair-sur-Epte. The events were attended by journalists from Sweden, Norway and Denmark. At the end of the day, the attendees were invited to visit Châteauneuf-sur-Epte: in total, they were more than 1,500 to visit the castle that day.

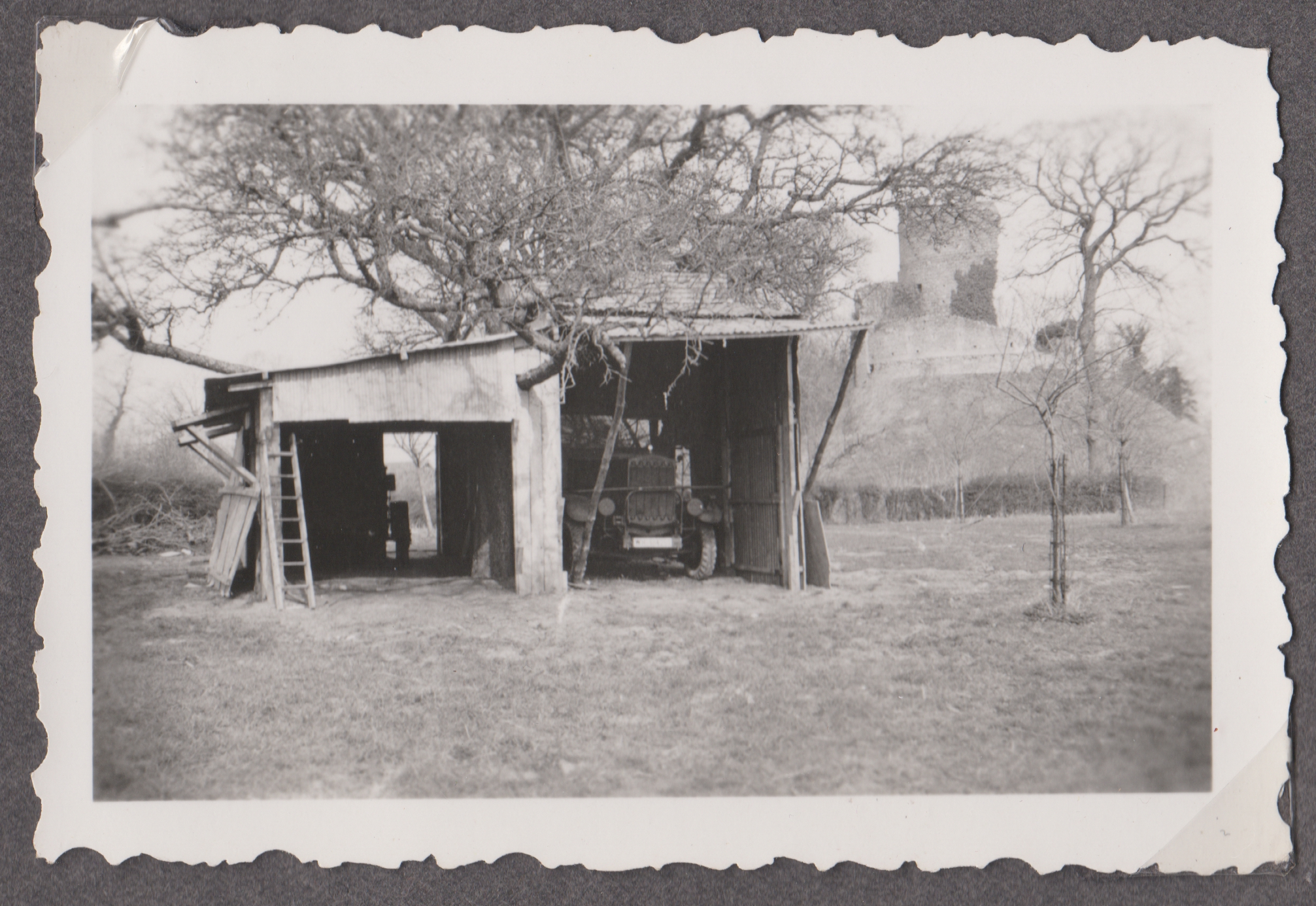
A German radio van Krupp L3H163 in a shed in front of the castle, 1941

During the Second World War, between 1941 and 1944, the castle was used by the German army, which settled a transmission post with a large transmitting aerial. A garrison stayed in the village and lived alongside the inhabitants. For a few days in 1944, the castle was occupied by the command post of the 49th Infantry Division of the Wehrmacht (led by General Macholz). At the very end of August, Lieutenant Brian Horrocks's troops (XXX British Corps) began the reconquest of the Norman Vexin. Heading towards Gisors, the British troops passed through Château-sur-Epte on 29 August before arriving at Dangu that same evening.

== Preservation ==
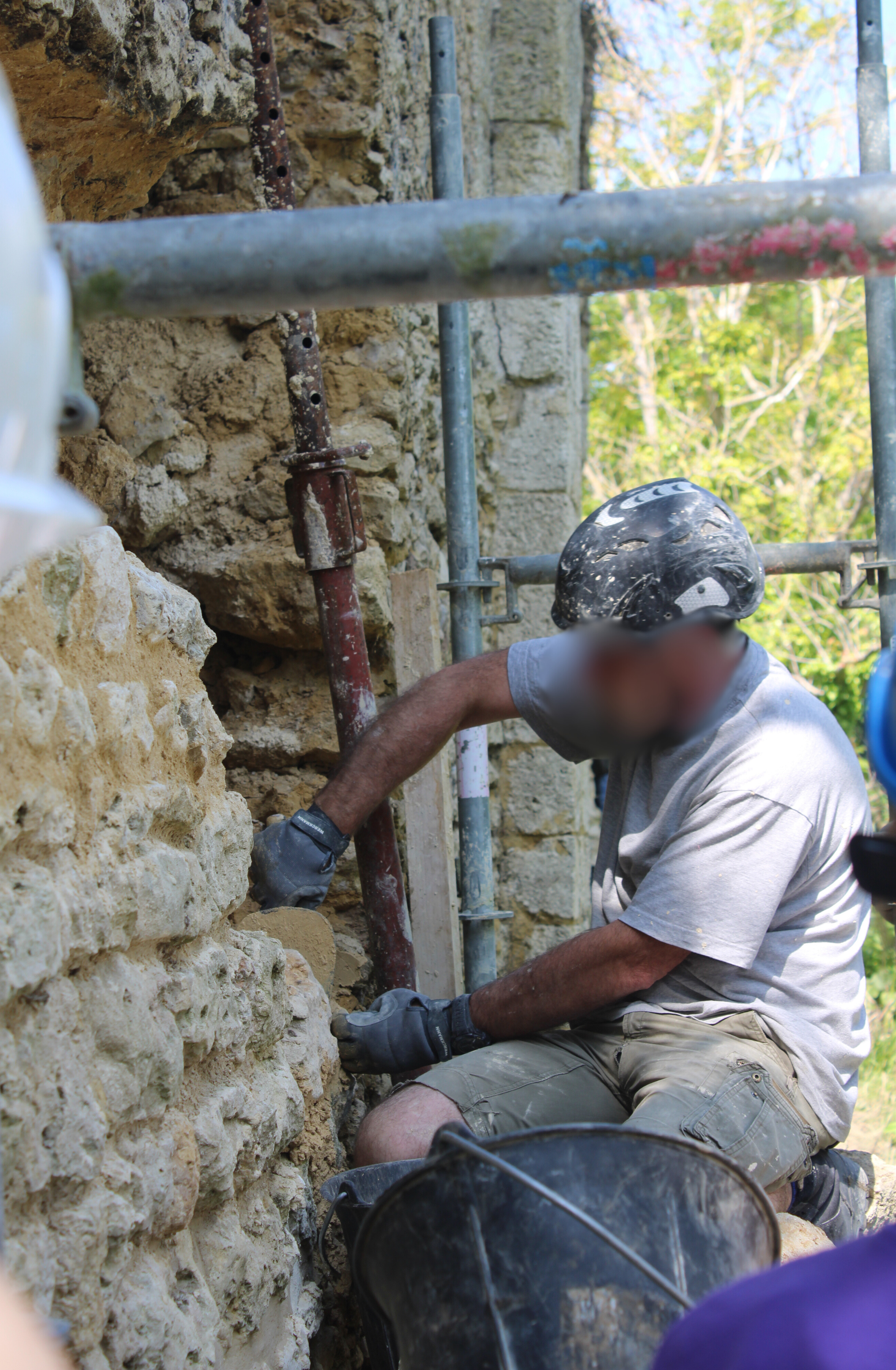
A mason gives a demonstration to volunteers

In 2015, volunteers created the Héritage Historique association in order to preserve, restore and bring the old fortress back to life. Until then, the castle had fallen into ruin and risked serious damage. In its first year, the association had 37 members and around 60 volunteers, who began in 2016 with more than six months of land clearance. At the time, the site was overgrown with vegetation that was damaging the spaces.

The first masonry work began in 2017, followed in 2019 by major works such as strengthening the west gate tower. Nowadays, volunteers take part in workcamps on the second weekend of each month or during Rempart workcamps in the summer.

The restoration of the castle is one of the projects selected for the 2020 French Heritage Lottery. In 2021, the Heritage Mission (run by the Fondation du Patrimoine) awarded a grant of €244,000 to the association. This grant, covering for the restoration of the west gate tower, the curtain wall, the south wall and the dwelling, was estimated at 30.88% of the total cost of the work.

The aim of the restoration project is to open the castle to visitors, along with organising events such as medieval fairs and markets.

== See also ==
- List of castles in France
