= Château-sur-Epte =

- Commune
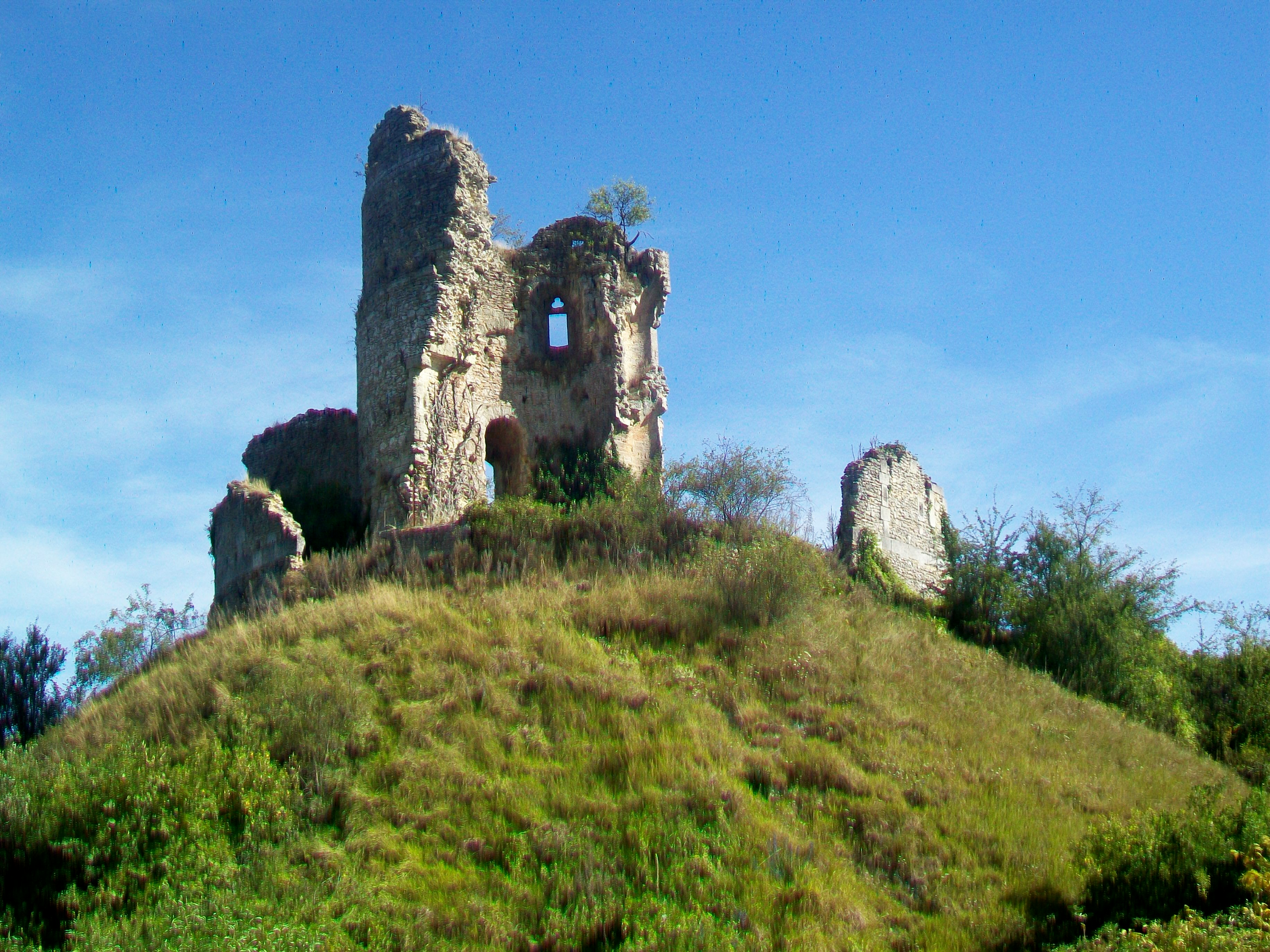
- Ruins of the chateau

- Coat of arms
- Location of Château-sur-Epte
- Location within France Location within Normandy
- Coordinates: 49°12′32″N 1°40′09″E
- Country: France
- Region: Normandy
- Department: Eure
- Arrondissement: Les Andelys
- Canton: Les Andelys

Government
  - Mayor (2020–2026): Nathalie Caillaud
- Area^{1}: 4.6 km^{2} (1.8 sq mi)
- Elevation: 140 m (460 ft)
- Highest elevation: 134 m (440 ft)
- Lowest elevation: 31 m (102 ft)
- Population (2023): 659
  - Density: 140/km^{2} (370/sq mi)
- Time zone: UTC+01:00 (CET)
  - Summer (DST): UTC+02:00 (CEST)
- INSEE/Postal code: 27152 /27420
- ^{1} French Land Register data, which excludes lakes, ponds, glaciers > 1 km^{2} (0.386 sq mi or 247 acres) and river estuaries.

Château-sur-Epte is a commune in the Eure department in northern France.

== Population ==
Historical population
Year	Pop.	±% p.a.
1968	404	—
1975	410	+0.21%
1982	357	−1.96%
1990	632	+7.40%
1999	661	+0.50%
2007	580	−1.62%
2012	599	+0.65%
2017	569	−1.02%
2023	659	+2.48%
Source: INSEE

== See also ==
- Château-sur-Epte Castle
- Communes of the Eure department
