= Mesnil-Verclives =

- Commune
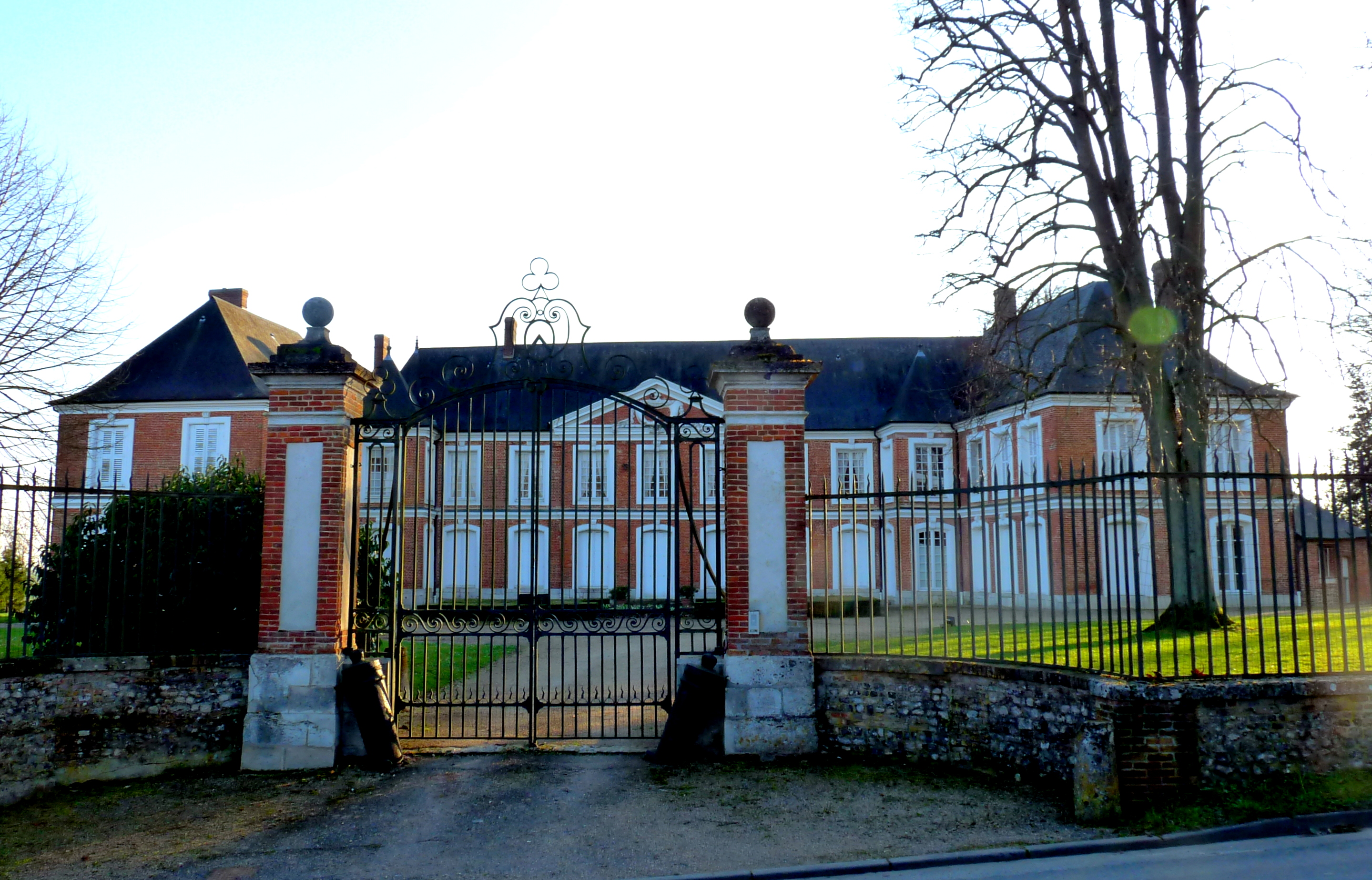
- The chateau of Verclives

- Coat of arms
- Location of Mesnil-Verclives
- Location within France Location within Normandy
- Coordinates: 49°19′16″N 1°28′05″E
- Country: France
- Region: Normandy
- Department: Eure
- Arrondissement: Les Andelys
- Canton: Les Andelys
- Intercommunality: Seine Normandie Agglomération

Government
  - Mayor (2020–2026): Michel Lagrange
- Area^{1}: 9.96 km^{2} (3.85 sq mi)
- Elevation: 147 m (482 ft)
- Highest elevation: 173 m (568 ft)
- Lowest elevation: 92 m (302 ft)
- Population (2023): 290
  - Density: 29/km^{2} (75/sq mi)
- Time zone: UTC+01:00 (CET)
  - Summer (DST): UTC+02:00 (CEST)
- INSEE/Postal code: 27407 /27440
- ^{1} French Land Register data, which excludes lakes, ponds, glaciers > 1 km^{2} (0.386 sq mi or 247 acres) and river estuaries.

Mesnil-Verclives (French pronunciation: [mɛnil vɛʁkliv]) is a commune in the Eure department in Normandy in northern France.

== Etymology ==
Old North French Mesnil 'house' and Verclives (Warcliva 11th century) Old English clif or Old Norse klif. Verclives is located on a small hill. The first element could be Old English waeter. In French intervocalic consonants weakened and erased.

Old English clif or Old Norse klif can be found in several place-names of Normandy such as Witeclive 'white cliff' former hamlet near Evreux; Carquelif (Caleclif 1224 in Saint-Martin-en-Campagne); Risleclif former hamlet near Saint-Samson-de-la-Roque; Mont Escalleclif (12th century, Doville); Mont Entenclin (Mont Estenclif 'stone cliff')...

The hill was used as an observation post at the battle of Brémule.

== Population ==
Historical population
Year	Pop.	±% p.a.
1968	180	—
1975	142	−3.33%
1982	165	+2.17%
1990	203	+2.62%
1999	218	+0.80%
2007	265	+2.47%
2012	269	+0.30%
2017	316	+3.27%
2023	290	−1.42%
Source: INSEE

== See also ==
- Communes of the Eure department
