= Harquency =

- Commune
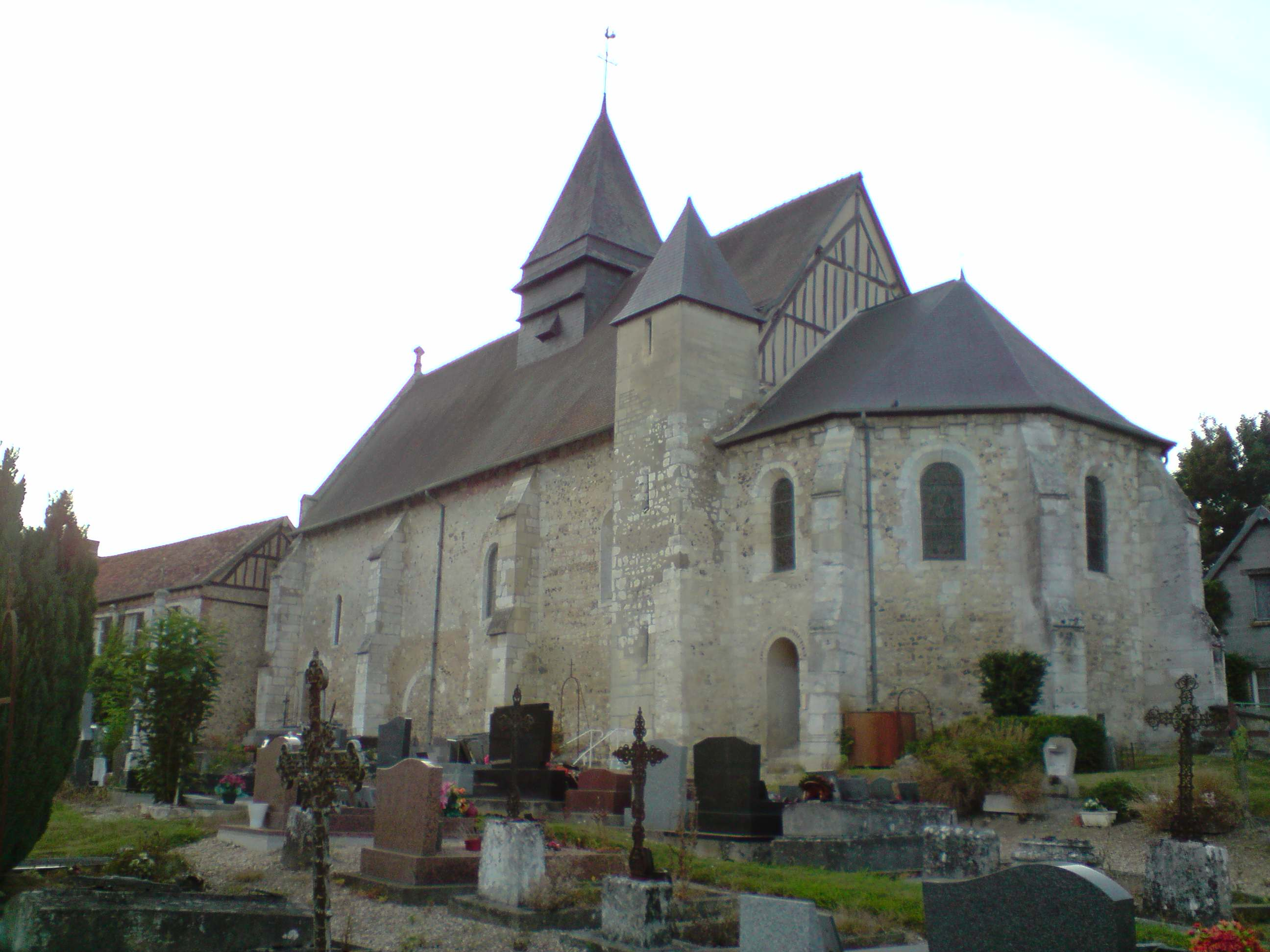
- The church of Saint-Pierre in Harquency
- Location of Harquency
- Location within France Location within Normandy
- Coordinates: 49°15′18″N 1°29′10″E
- Country: France
- Region: Normandy
- Department: Eure
- Arrondissement: Les Andelys
- Canton: Les Andelys
- Intercommunality: Seine Normandie Agglomération

Government
  - Mayor (2022–2026): Christian Fournial
- Area^{1}: 13.95 km^{2} (5.39 sq mi)
- Elevation: 26 m (85 ft)
- Highest elevation: 132 m (433 ft)
- Lowest elevation: 40 m (130 ft)
- Population (2023): 271
  - Density: 19.4/km^{2} (50.3/sq mi)
- Time zone: UTC+01:00 (CET)
  - Summer (DST): UTC+02:00 (CEST)
- INSEE/Postal code: 27315 /27700
- ^{1} French Land Register data, which excludes lakes, ponds, glaciers > 1 km^{2} (0.386 sq mi or 247 acres) and river estuaries.

Harquency (French pronunciation: [aʁkɑ̃si]) is a commune in the Eure department in northern France.

== Population ==
Historical population
Year	Pop.	±% p.a.
1968	117	—
1975	131	+1.63%
1982	140	+0.95%
1990	183	+3.40%
1999	237	+2.91%
2007	261	+1.21%
2012	265	+0.30%
2017	264	−0.08%
2023	271	+0.44%
Source: INSEE

== See also ==
- Communes of the Eure department
