= Guiseniers =

- Commune
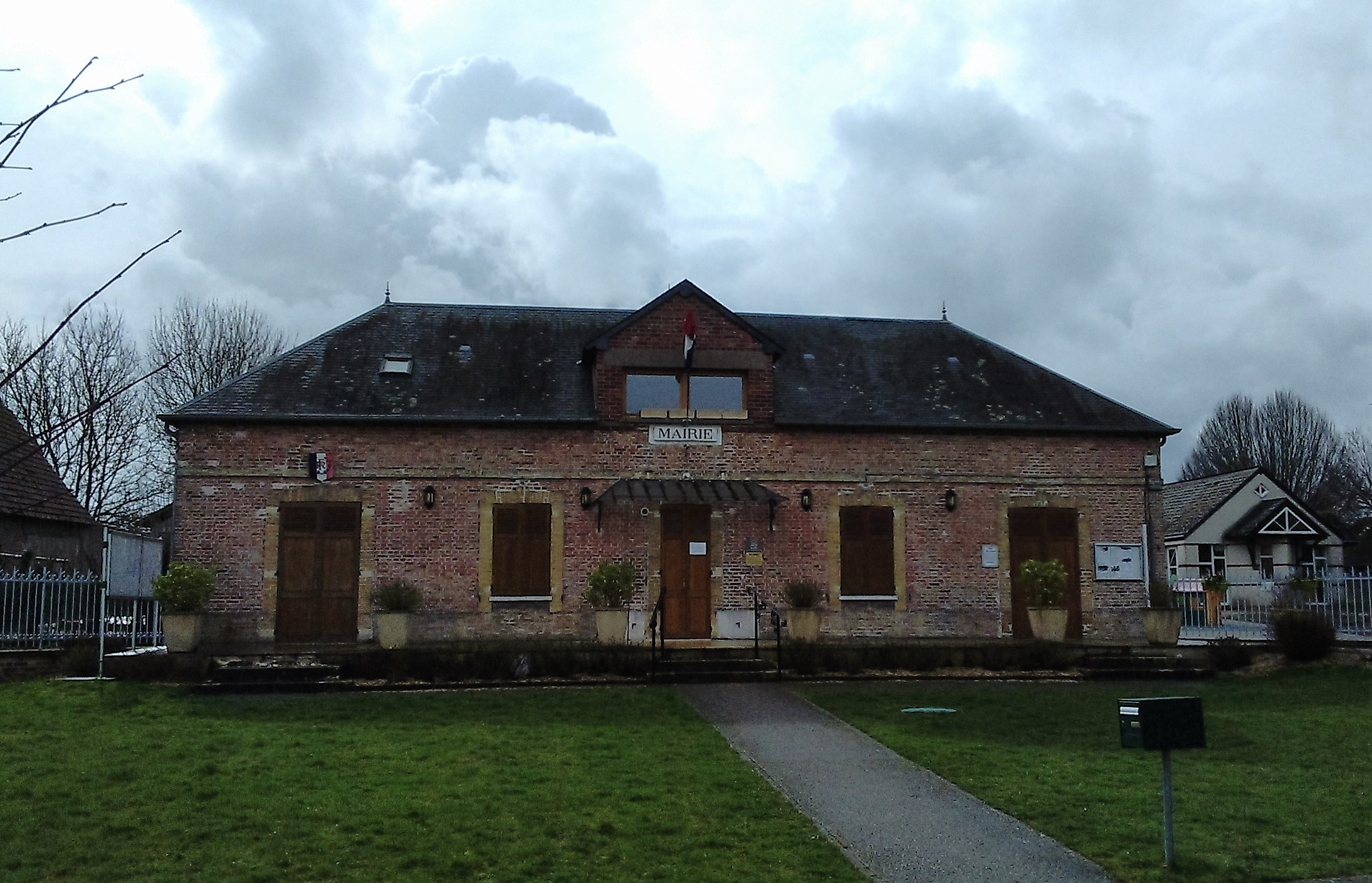
- The town hall in Guiseniers

- Coat of arms
- Location of Guiseniers
- Location within France Location within Normandy
- Coordinates: 49°12′57″N 1°28′29″E
- Country: France
- Region: Normandy
- Department: Eure
- Arrondissement: Les Andelys
- Canton: Les Andelys
- Intercommunality: Seine Normandie Agglomération

Government
  - Mayor (2020–2026): Philippe Fleury
- Area^{1}: 10.71 km^{2} (4.14 sq mi)
- Elevation: 149 m (489 ft)
- Highest elevation: 158 m (518 ft)
- Lowest elevation: 84 m (276 ft)
- Population (2023): 493
  - Density: 46.0/km^{2} (119/sq mi)
- Time zone: UTC+01:00 (CET)
  - Summer (DST): UTC+02:00 (CEST)
- INSEE/Postal code: 27307 /27700
- ^{1} French Land Register data, which excludes lakes, ponds, glaciers > 1 km^{2} (0.386 sq mi or 247 acres) and river estuaries.

Guiseniers (French pronunciation: [ɡiznje]) is a commune in the Eure department in northern France.

== Population ==
Historical population
Year	Pop.	±% p.a.
1968	289	—
1975	237	−2.79%
1982	291	+2.98%
1990	388	+3.66%
1999	382	−0.17%
2007	415	+1.04%
2012	438	+1.08%
2017	461	+1.03%
2023	493	+1.12%
Source: INSEE

== See also ==
- Communes of the Eure department
