= Bouafles =

- Commune
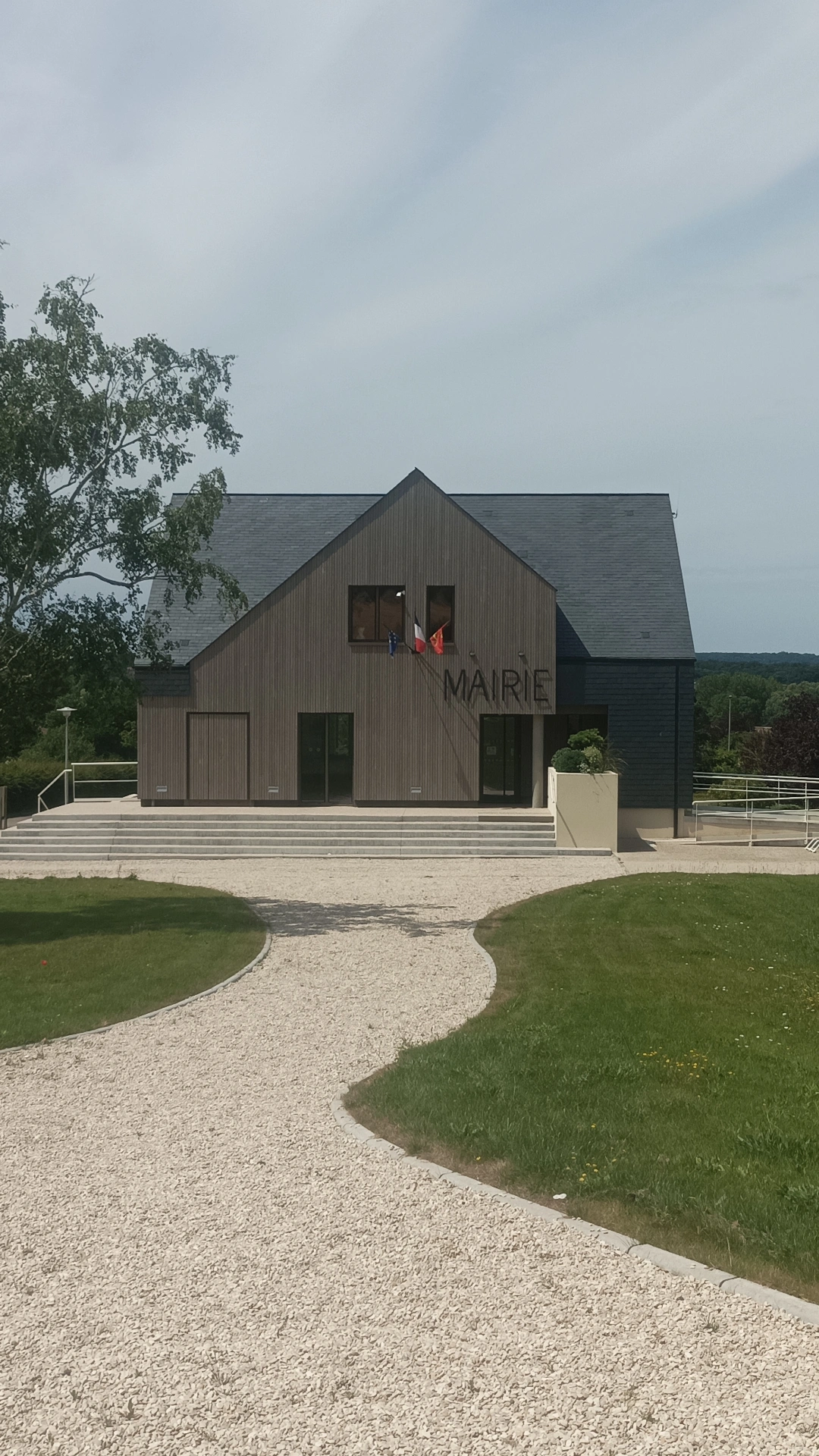
- The town hall in Bouafles, July 2024
- Location of Bouafles
- Location within France Location within Normandy
- Coordinates: 49°12′41″N 1°23′06″E
- Country: France
- Region: Normandy
- Department: Eure
- Arrondissement: Les Andelys
- Canton: Les Andelys
- Intercommunality: Seine Normandie Agglomération

Government
  - Mayor (2020–2026): Anne Froment-Prouvost
- Area^{1}: 12.61 km^{2} (4.87 sq mi)
- Highest elevation: 146 m (479 ft)
- Lowest elevation: 7 m (23 ft)
- Population (2023): 628
  - Density: 49.8/km^{2} (129/sq mi)
- Time zone: UTC+01:00 (CET)
  - Summer (DST): UTC+02:00 (CEST)
- INSEE/Postal code: 27097 /27700
- ^{1} French Land Register data, which excludes lakes, ponds, glaciers > 1 km^{2} (0.386 sq mi or 247 acres) and river estuaries.

Bouafles (French pronunciation: [bwafl]) is a commune in the Eure department in Normandy in northern France.

It is located 6 km south-west of Les Andelys on the river Seine.

Notable buildings include the Chateau De Bouafles in Rue De Mousseaux; Église Saint-Pierre in Rue Du Préleran; and the Bouafles town in Rue Haute.

In the grounds of the Chateau de Bouafles is a static caravan site, Caravaning residentiel du Chateau de Bouafles.

== Population ==
Historical population
Year	Pop.	±% p.a.
1968	256	—
1975	367	+5.28%
1982	469	+3.57%
1990	682	+4.79%
1999	618	−1.09%
2007	632	+0.28%
2012	650	+0.56%
2017	653	+0.09%
2023	628	−0.65%
Source: INSEE

== See also ==
- Communes of the Eure department
