= Notre-Dame-de-l'Isle =

- Commune
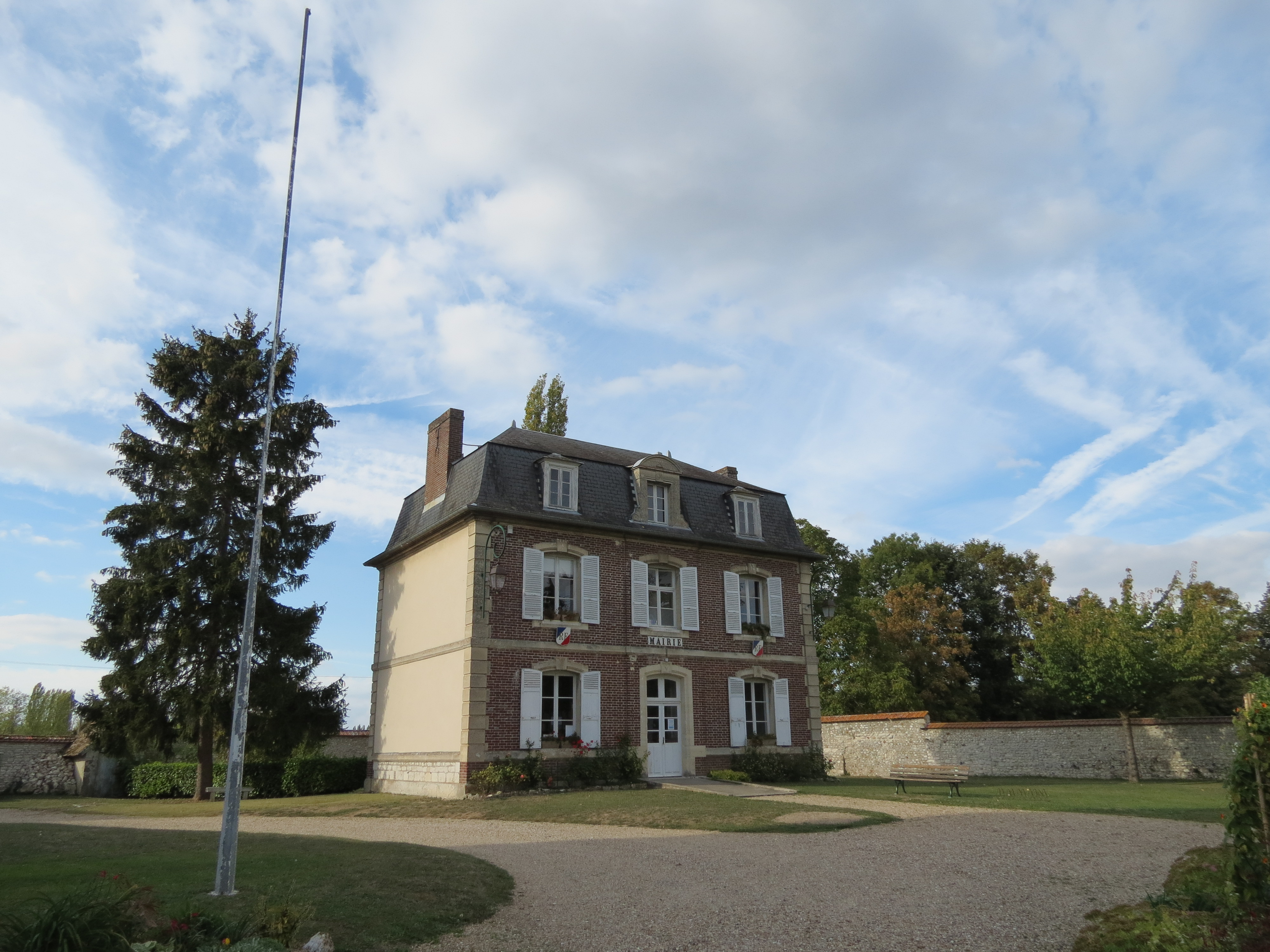
- The town hall in Notre-Dame-de-l'Isle
- Location of Notre-Dame-de-l'Isle
- Location within France Location within Normandy
- Coordinates: 49°08′46″N 1°25′57″E
- Country: France
- Region: Normandy
- Department: Eure
- Arrondissement: Les Andelys
- Canton: Les Andelys
- Intercommunality: Seine Normandie Agglomération

Government
  - Mayor (2020–2026): Thibaut Beauté
- Area^{1}: 11.81 km^{2} (4.56 sq mi)
- Elevation: 60 m (200 ft)
- Highest elevation: 143 m (469 ft)
- Lowest elevation: 14 m (46 ft)
- Population (2023): 630
  - Density: 53/km^{2} (140/sq mi)
- Time zone: UTC+01:00 (CET)
  - Summer (DST): UTC+02:00 (CEST)
- INSEE/Postal code: 27440 /27940
- ^{1} French Land Register data, which excludes lakes, ponds, glaciers > 1 km^{2} (0.386 sq mi or 247 acres) and river estuaries.

Notre-Dame-de-l'Isle (French pronunciation: [nɔtʁ dam də lil]) is a commune in the Eure department in Normandy in northern France.

== Population ==
Historical population
Year	Pop.	±% p.a.
1968	287	—
1975	316	+1.38%
1982	365	+2.08%
1990	584	+6.05%
1999	642	+1.06%
2007	677	+0.67%
2012	678	+0.03%
2017	671	−0.21%
2023	630	−1.05%
Source: INSEE

== See also ==
- Communes of the Eure department
