= Hennezis =

- Commune
- Coat of arms
- Location of Hennezis
- Location within France Location within Normandy
- Coordinates: 49°11′38″N 1°27′56″E
- Country: France
- Region: Normandy
- Department: Eure
- Arrondissement: Les Andelys
- Canton: Les Andelys
- Intercommunality: Seine Normandie Agglomération

Government
  - Mayor (2020–2026): Olivier Descamps
- Area^{1}: 15.63 km^{2} (6.03 sq mi)
- Elevation: 142 m (466 ft)
- Highest elevation: 160 m (520 ft)
- Lowest elevation: 44 m (144 ft)
- Population (2023): 744
  - Density: 47.6/km^{2} (123/sq mi)
- Time zone: UTC+01:00 (CET)
  - Summer (DST): UTC+02:00 (CEST)
- INSEE/Postal code: 27329 /27700
- ^{1} French Land Register data, which excludes lakes, ponds, glaciers > 1 km^{2} (0.386 sq mi or 247 acres) and river estuaries.

Hennezis (French pronunciation: [ɛnzi]) is a commune in the Eure department in northern France.

== Population ==
Historical population
Year	Pop.	±% p.a.
1968	389	—
1975	378	−0.41%
1982	539	+5.20%
1990	769	+4.54%
1999	750	−0.28%
2007	768	+0.30%
2012	747	−0.55%
2017	789	+1.10%
2023	744	−0.97%
Source: INSEE

== See also ==
- Communes of the Eure department
