= Port-Mort =

- Commune
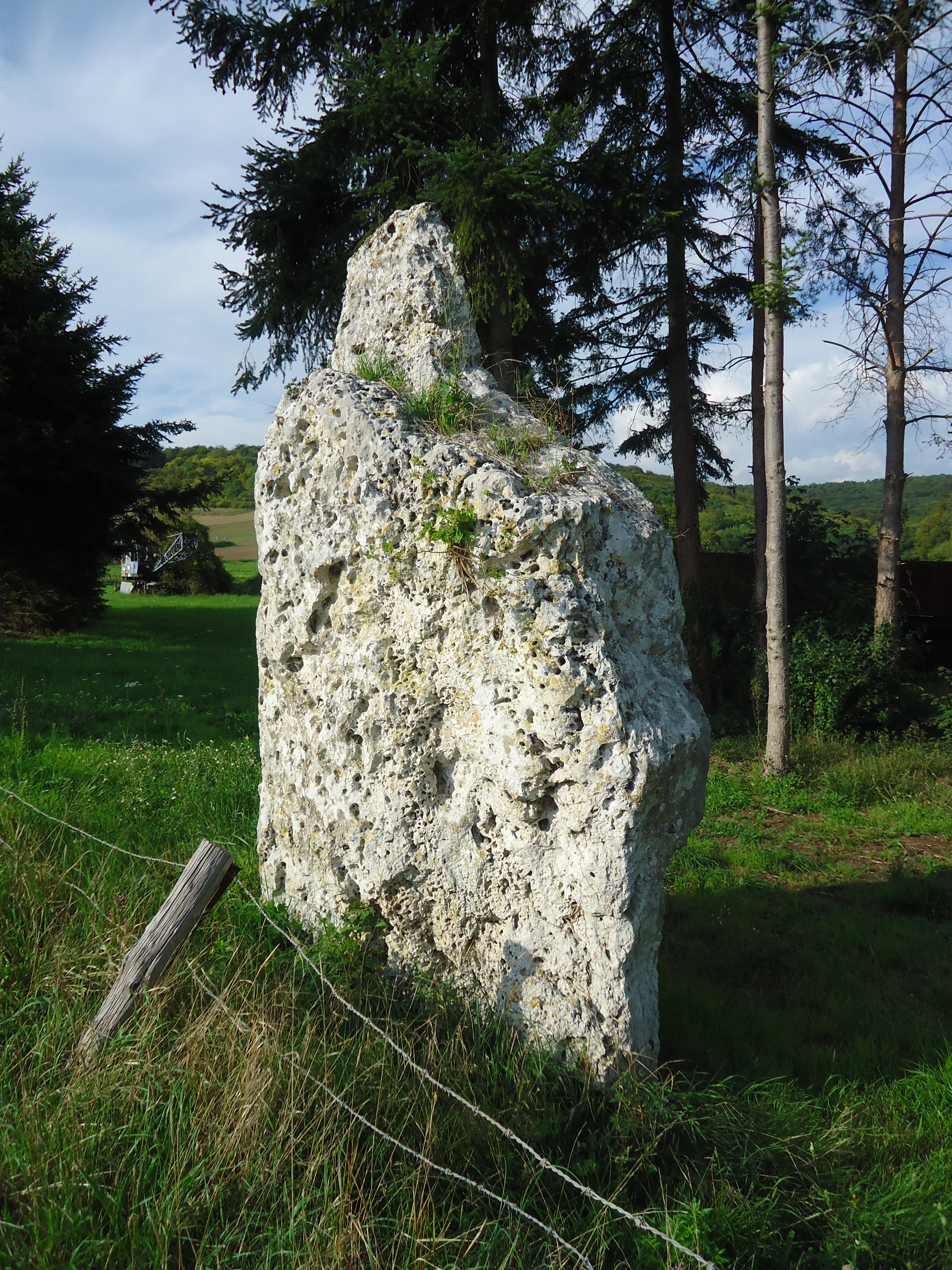
- Menhir

- Coat of arms
- Location of Port-Mort
- Location within France Location within Normandy
- Coordinates: 49°09′55″N 1°24′57″E
- Country: France
- Region: Normandy
- Department: Eure
- Arrondissement: Les Andelys
- Canton: Les Andelys
- Intercommunality: Seine Normandie Agglomération

Government
  - Mayor (2022–2026): Gilles Auloy
- Area^{1}: 12.17 km^{2} (4.70 sq mi)
- Elevation: 32 m (105 ft)
- Highest elevation: 138 m (453 ft)
- Lowest elevation: 8 m (26 ft)
- Population (2023): 889
  - Density: 73.0/km^{2} (189/sq mi)
- Time zone: UTC+01:00 (CET)
  - Summer (DST): UTC+02:00 (CEST)
- INSEE/Postal code: 27473 /27940
- ^{1} French Land Register data, which excludes lakes, ponds, glaciers > 1 km^{2} (0.386 sq mi or 247 acres) and river estuaries.

Port-Mort (French pronunciation: [pɔʁ mɔʁ]) is a commune in the Eure department in Normandy in northern France.

== Population ==
Historical population
Year	Pop.	±% p.a.
1968	431	—
1975	563	+3.89%
1982	672	+2.56%
1990	839	+2.81%
1999	820	−0.25%
2007	1,012	+2.66%
2012	941	−1.44%
2017	931	−0.21%
2023	889	−0.77%
Source: INSEE

== See also ==
- Communes of the Eure department
