= Porte-de-Seine =

- Commune
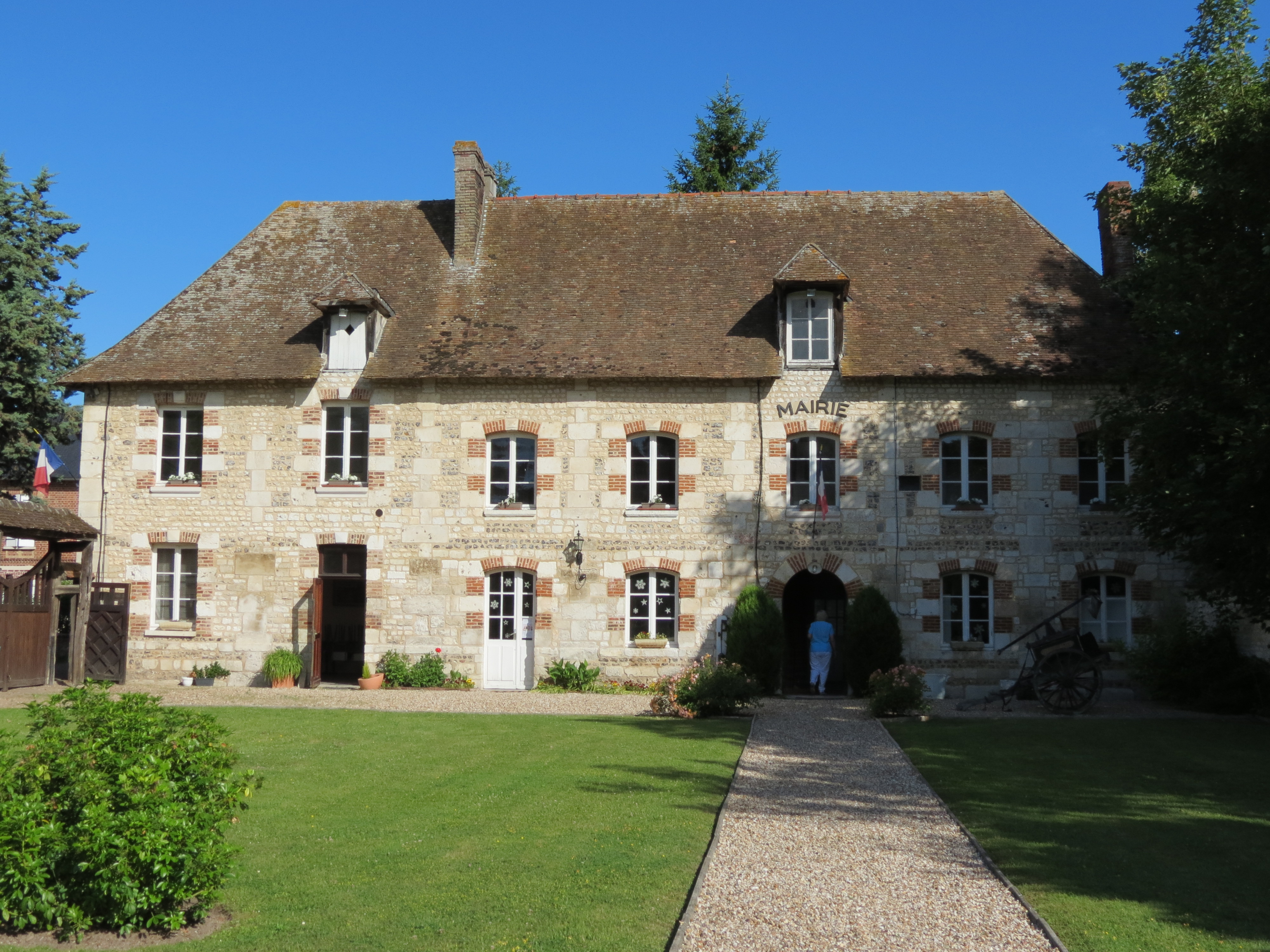
- The town hall in Porte-Joie
- Location of Porte-de-Seine
- Location within France Location within Normandy
- Coordinates: 49°14′47″N 1°15′20″E
- Country: France
- Region: Normandy
- Department: Eure
- Arrondissement: Les Andelys
- Canton: Val-de-Reuil
- Intercommunality: CA Seine-Eure

Government
  - Mayor (2020–2026): Jean-Philippe Brun
- Area^{1}: 12.56 km^{2} (4.85 sq mi)
- Population (2023): 208
  - Density: 16.6/km^{2} (42.9/sq mi)
- Time zone: UTC+01:00 (CET)
  - Summer (DST): UTC+02:00 (CEST)
- INSEE/Postal code: 27471 /27100, 27430
- ^{1} French Land Register data, which excludes lakes, ponds, glaciers > 1 km^{2} (0.386 sq mi or 247 acres) and river estuaries.

Porte-de-Seine (French pronunciation: [pɔʁt də sɛn]) is a commune in the department of Eure, northern France. The municipality was established on 1 January 2018 by merger of the former communes of Porte-Joie (the seat) and Tournedos-sur-Seine.

== See also ==
- Communes of the Eure department
