= Heuqueville, Eure =

Heuqueville
- Commune
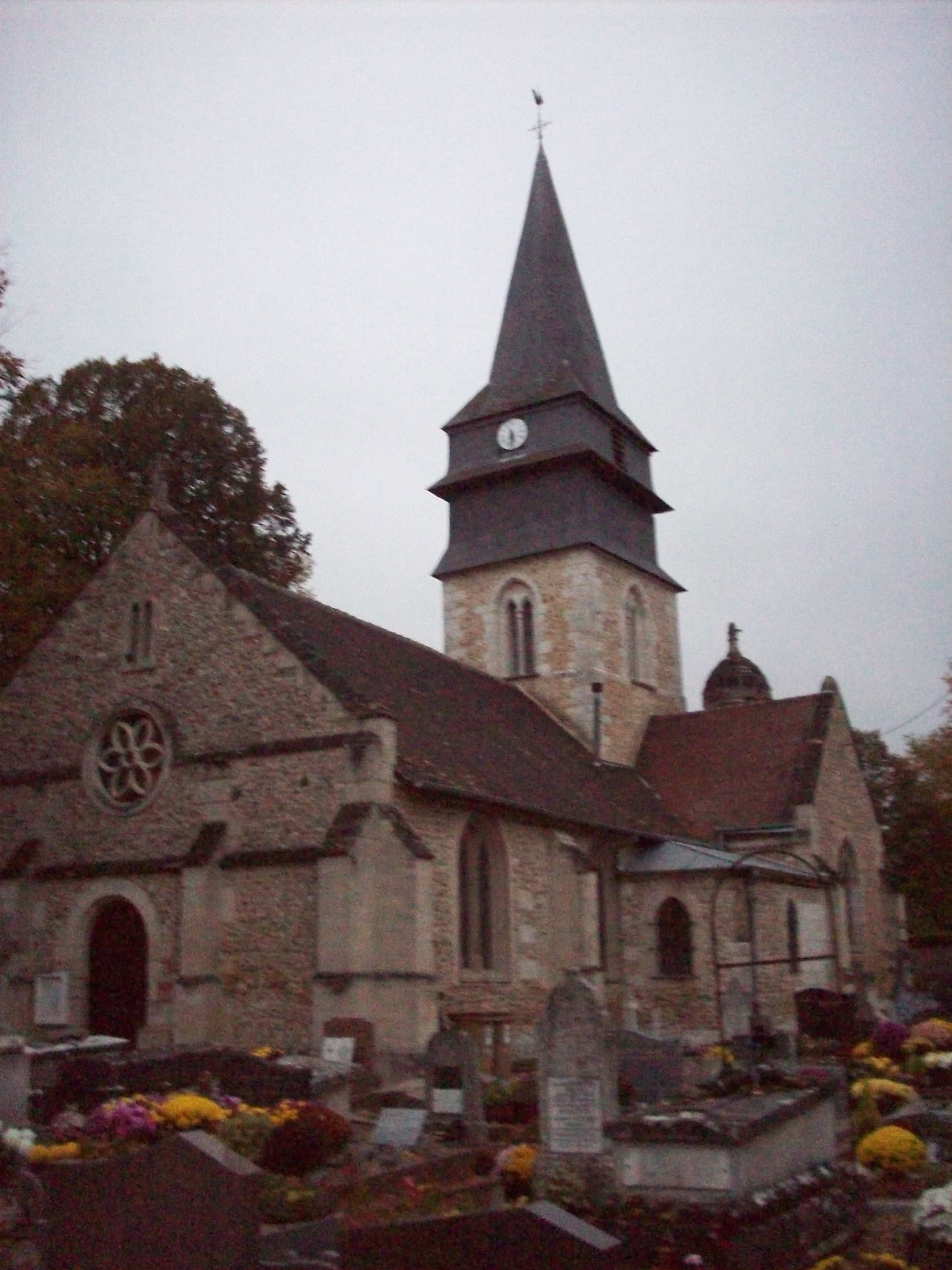
- The church of Saint-Germain in Heuqueville
- Location of Heuqueville
- Location within France Location within Normandy
- Coordinates: 49°17′19″N 1°20′25″E
- Country: France
- Region: Normandy
- Department: Eure
- Arrondissement: Les Andelys
- Canton: Les Andelys
- Intercommunality: Seine Normandie Agglomération

Government
  - Mayor (2020–2026): Jean-Pierre Savary
- Area^{1}: 7.77 km^{2} (3.00 sq mi)
- Elevation: 150 m (490 ft)
- Highest elevation: 154 m (505 ft)
- Lowest elevation: 73 m (240 ft)
- Population (2023): 353
  - Density: 45.4/km^{2} (118/sq mi)
- Time zone: UTC+01:00 (CET)
  - Summer (DST): UTC+02:00 (CEST)
- INSEE/Postal code: 27337 /27700
- ^{1} French Land Register data, which excludes lakes, ponds, glaciers > 1 km^{2} (0.386 sq mi or 247 acres) and river estuaries.

Heuqueville (French pronunciation: [økvil]) is a commune in the Eure department in northern France.

== Population ==
Historical population
Year	Pop.	±% p.a.
1968	225	—
1975	235	+0.62%
1982	284	+2.74%
1990	362	+3.08%
1999	346	−0.50%
2007	388	+1.44%
2012	394	+0.31%
2017	361	−1.73%
2023	353	−0.37%
Source: INSEE

== See also ==
- Communes of the Eure department
