= Tournedos-sur-Seine =

- Part of Porte-de-Seine
- Location of Tournedos-sur-Seine
- Location within France Location within Normandy
- Coordinates: 49°16′29″N 1°15′42″E
- Country: France
- Region: Normandy
- Department: Eure
- Arrondissement: Les Andelys
- Canton: Val-de-Reuil
- Commune: Porte-de-Seine
- Area^{1}: 5.64 km^{2} (2.18 sq mi)
- Elevation: 14 m (46 ft)
- Highest elevation: 14 m (46 ft)
- Lowest elevation: 8 m (26 ft)
- Population (2023): 107
  - Density: 19.0/km^{2} (49.1/sq mi)
- Time zone: UTC+01:00 (CET)
  - Summer (DST): UTC+02:00 (CEST)
- Postal code: 27100
- ^{1} French Land Register data, which excludes lakes, ponds, glaciers > 1 km^{2} (0.386 sq mi or 247 acres) and river estuaries.

Tournedos-sur-Seine is a small village and a former commune in the Eure department in Normandy in northern France. On 1 January 2018, it was merged into the new commune of Porte-de-Seine.

The village has approximately 25 houses, all of them situated in the banks of the river Seine.

== See also ==
- Communes of the Eure department
