= Canton of Les Andelys =

Coordinates: 49°14′27″N 1°24′01″E

Les Andelys
- Canton
- Interactive map of Les Andelys
- Country: France
- Region: Normandy
- Department: Eure
- No. of communes: {{{nbcomm}}}
- Area: 406.12 km^{2} (156.80 sq mi)
- Population (2023): 26,997
  - Density: 66.475/km^{2} (172.17/sq mi)
- INSEE code: 27 01

Canton of Les Andelys is a canton of the Arrondissement of Les Andelys in the Eure department of France. The seat lies at Les Andelys.

== Communes ==
At the French canton reorganisation which came into effect in March 2015, the canton was expanded from 20 to 41 communes (17 of which merged into the new communes Vexin-sur-Epte and Frenelles-en-Vexin):

- Les Andelys
- Bois-Jérôme-Saint-Ouen
- Bouafles
- Château-sur-Epte
- Cuverville
- Daubeuf-près-Vatteville
- Écouis
- Frenelles-en-Vexin
- Guiseniers
- Harquency
- Hennezis
- Heubécourt-Haricourt
- Heuqueville
- Mesnil-Verclives
- Mézières-en-Vexin
- Muids
- Notre-Dame-de-l'Isle
- Port-Mort
- Pressagny-l'Orgueilleux
- La Roquette
- Suzay
- Thuit
- Tilly
- Vatteville
- Vexin-sur-Epte
- Vézillon
