= Louis Poirson =

French serial killer and rapist

- Born: September 1962 (age 64); Madagascar
- Other name: "Rambo"
- Conviction: Murder
- Penalty: Life imprisonment

Details
- Victims: 4
- Span of crimes: 1995–1999
- Country: France
- Date apprehended: May 2000

Louis Poirson, nicknamed "Rambo" (born September 1962 in Madagascar), is a French rapist and serial killer.

== Biography ==
Born into a family of four children of which he is the eldest and the only boy, Poirson was the son of a French father and a Malagasy mother. He claims to have become the scapegoat of his alcoholic father who beat him regularly, often for no reason, under the watchful eye of a passive mother. He then experienced a ferocious hatred towards them.

He was described by the witnesses who succeeded his lawsuits in laudatory terms: "very motivated and pleasant to attend" pupil, an "exemplary" employee and a "considerate" companion.

In 1980, he obtained a sailing CAP and became a boatman on a pusher of the Rhine. His employer lauded his "effective and serious" work and "exemplary" behaviour.

He was endowed with a Herculean strength, and he dreamt of becoming a para-commando. "I love the army and I wanted to become para-commando, for travel, sport and combat", but because of a fibula fracture, he could not become a paratrooper and he was highly disappointed. In 1982, he became a conscript.

== Crimes ==
=== Rape series ===
Between 1983 and 1984, Poirson committed seven rapes and assaults (sometimes under the threat of a weapon, some of his victims being strangled) in the Strasbourg region. He committed his last rape in a forest, and the victim noted the license plate of the car, which belonged to Poirson's lover.

In January 1985, he was arrested and incarcerated.

In December 1985, he was tried and sentenced to 15 years in prison.

While serving his sentence in the prisons of Ensisheim and Fleury-Mérogis, he maintained a correspondence with Chantal Vaslet, his future companion. She was a maternal assistant, 14 years older than him, with six girls. He was released in July 1994 after nine years and six months of detention. Poirson then became a stonemason in the Paris region.

=== Kidnapping and murder series ===
On 30 August 1995, Poirson was drinking a glass on the terrace of a bar. He was enjoying this moment of rest, but the barking of a nearby dog prevented him from doing so, making him angry. He walked through the fields and went to the animal cemetery of Douains to avenge himself for being so bothered. He broke the window of the tool shed, grabbed one and used it to ransack the animals' graves. Jeanine Villain, 67, and her 44-year-old daughter Monique, who lived in Saint-Vincent-des-Bois, came to the grave of their dog "Babette", hearing the sounds and surprising her. Monique threatened to call the gendarmes and stood up to him. Not supporting this, he stunned Jeanine Villain and attacked Monique, putting them in their car, a BX, and taking them to a field in Neuilly. He suggested to Monique that he could release them if they kept quiet, but she refused. He stifled Monique by putting her head in a plastic bag and broke Villain's neck by hitting her with a piece of wood. He went to look for a can of gasoline at La Villeneuve-en-Chevrie at the Molières farm where he worked and returned to burn the bodies of the two women. Then he left with the car to walk in Paris and returned to Mantes-la-Jolie, where he abandoned and burned the car under a railway bridge, where it was later found. He walked home.

The bodies of the two women were found on 2 September 1995 by passers-by. The investigators directed their suspicions on Michel Villain, 47 years old, son and half-brother of the two victims, with whom he has been scrambled for ten years. Misrepresented by his own 24-year-old son, Michel Villain was indicted and would spend three years in custody before being released after the confession of Louis Poirson.

In June 1996, Louis Poirson kidnapped three 15-year-old hitchhikers in Chaufour-lès-Bonnières and sequestrated them on the farm in La Villeneuve-en-Chevrie, but they escaped. He was arrested, tried in January 1997 and sentenced to three years in prison.

He was released in July 1998.

On 28 July 1998, in Douains, Poirson violated Adeline, a 20-year-old woman.

Lucie Pham-Ngoc-Bich, 73 years old, resides at the retirement home A.R.E.P.A. on Frédéric Chopin street, at Val Fourré in Mantes-la-Jolie, she was "disconcerting of naivety" and under tutelage. On 28 April 1999, she went out for a walk in the street, as she did every day. Poirson, driving his wife's car, passed by her and offered to take her away, and she got on board. Soon after, she asked him to stop because she wanted to urinate. As soon as he could, he stopped the car in a rest area, got out of the car and brought her out. He then found that she had relieved herself on her passenger seat. Furious, he pushed her violently, she fell and was stunned. He put her back in the car and took her to La Villeneuve-en-Chevrie on the farm where he worked. They quarrelled again and he strangled her, then carried the body behind the farm to the edge of the field in Chaufour-lès-Bonnières and buried it.

On 5 September 1999, Charlotte Berson, 79, a widow, went for a walk in the countryside near her home in Pacy-sur-Eure, as she did every day. Poirson, driving his wife's car, passed by her, stopping, and blocking her passage. He offered to take her by car. She categorically refused and knocked on the hood of the car to clear the passage. He feared that she had damaged the car by striking it, became furious and pushed Berson violently, who fell on a stone and was knocked unconscious. He put her in the car and took her to La Villeneuve-en-Chevrie where he strangled her. He then put her back in the car and hid the naked body in a thicket at Chaussy. He poured hydrochloric acid on her face and hands in the hope of preventing her from being identified. Berson's family reported her disappearance. On 3 October 1999, two hunters discovered the corpse. She was still wearing her watch on her wrist. She was identified by the serial number on the pin in the left wrist. The family recognized her watch. Investigators believed she was sequestered about two weeks before her body was abandoned, as the acid delayed the appearance of the burying beetles. The study of the bolus during the autopsy concluded that Berson was killed the day of her disappearance, and contradicted the observations of the entomological analysis.

On the morning of 3 May 2000, Clémence, 38, took the train from Paris to return home to Vernon. She caught the wrong train and was forced to go down to Mantes-la-Jolie. She was upset because she had an appointment at the school where her son was attending. She went to a bus stop, to take a bus to Vernon. Poirson, driving his car, passed by and offered to take her there. But before that, he had to go to his place of work to drop off the boxes that were in the trunk of the car. Arriving at the farm in La Villeneuve-en-Chevrie, he got out of the car, opened the trunk, then opened the passenger door and threatened Clémence with a knife. He forced her to get out of the car, screaming. He tied her hands behind her back and dragged her into one of the farm buildings under construction. During the fight, Clémence's watch fell at the foot of the stairs. He showed her to a small room on the first floor where there was only one old mattress on the floor. He gagged her, tied her tightly and left her there. He went down to work in his studio. His boss arrived and was surprised to find the woman's watch. She went down and found Clémence. She confronted Poirson and asked him what was going on. He answered that he knew that there was a woman being held on the first floor, that he was the one who took her away and that he would take her home. Panicked, he untied Clémence and told him to take her home by car. The boss called him while Poirson was driving. She told him that she had warned the gendarmerie by phone. She ordered him to go after dropping Clémence at home. Arriving in Vernon, he apologized to Clémence, then he returned to Bonnieres-sur-Seine to surrender to the gendarmerie. He was indicted for kidnapping and forcible confinement. He was arrested and incarcerated in Bois d'Arcy.

During interrogations in custody, Poirson was very calm, and very respectful to the investigators. He recognized the facts only if the investigators submitted irrefutable evidence against him. They understood that he wanted at all costs to prevent his wife from being involved. They told him that since he had used Chantal's car several times, they could also put her in custody, so he confessed immediately. He claimed to have killed Charlotte Berson because she looked like his mother. With regard to the animal cemetery, he declared: "such a tralala for a dead dog" and that "the stone is expensive". During the search of his home, the investigators discovered jewellery of women that were not his wife's. He declared to have found them. Charlotte Berson's family did not recognize the jewellery. Françoise Maricourt, social counselor, recognized Lucie Pham-Ngoc-Bich's bracelet.

The journalist Michèle Fines, reporting on a gendarmerie investigation, filmed Poirson's custody and interviewed him afterwards.

A picture of a naked woman in the woods, looking terrified, was found in the personal effects of Poirson. The investigators, convinced that this was another victim, questioned him about it. He declared that he had never seen this woman and that it is a picture that he had simply found.

=== List of known victims ===
Facts		Identity	Age	Discovery	
Date	Place	Identity	Age	Date	Place
30 August 1995	Douains	Jeanine Villain	67	2 September 1995	Neuilly
30 August 1995	Douains	Monique Villain	44	2 September 1995	Neuilly
June 1996	Chaufour-lès-Bonnières	hitchhiker	15	June 1996	La Villeneuve-en-Chevrie
June 1996	Chaufour-lès-Bonnières	hitchhiker	15	June 1996	La Villeneuve-en-Chevrie
June 1996	Chaufour-lès-Bonnières	hitchhiker	15	June 1996	La Villeneuve-en-Chevrie
28 July 1998	Douains	Adeline	20	28 July 1998	Douains
28 April 1999	Mantes-la-Jolie	Lucie Pham-Ngoc-Bich	73	23 January 2001	Chaufour-lès-Bonnières
5 September 1999	Pacy-sur-Eure	Charlotte Berson	79	3 October 1999	Chaussy
3 May 2000	Mantes-la-Jolie	Clémence	38	3 May 2000	La Villeneuve-en-Chevrie

== Trial and conviction ==
On 23 September 2002, the trial of Louis Poirson began at the cour d'assises of Eure in Évreux for the double murder of Jeanine and Monique Villain.

Aude Le Guilcher was the general counsel. Vincent Picard was the lawyer of Michel Villain. The defence of Louis Poirson was provided by Guylène Grimaud.

On 24 September 2002, Louis Poirson was sentenced to life imprisonment.

On 2 February 2005, the trial of Louis Poirson began at the cour d'assises in Yvelines, Versailles for the murders of Lucie Pham-Ngoc-Bich and Charlotte Berson and for the rapes of Adeline and Clémence.

Marie-Thérèse de Givry was the general counsel. Emmanuel Daoud was the lawyer of the Berson family. The defence of Louis Poirson was provided by Sophie Gourmelon.

In February 2005, Louis Poirson was sentenced to life imprisonment, with a 22-year sentence of security.

== TV documentaries ==
- "Louis Poirson, the stonemason" in September 2007 and September 2008, presented by Christophe Hondelatte in Faites entrer l'accusé on France 2.
- "The Poirson Case, Confessions of a Killer" 29 December 2010 in Enquêtes criminelles: le magazine des faits-divers on W9.
- "Louis Poirson, the murderer of old ladies" 28 November 2012, 11 and 21 January, 10, 15 and 23 October, 1, 8 and 9 November 2013 and 26 June 2015 in Stéphane Bourgoin raconte on Planète + Justice.

== Radio shows ==
- "The case Louis Poirson, the stonemason" 22 October 2013 in L'Heure du crime of Jacques Pradel on RTL.
- "Louis Poirson, the stonemason" 9 September 2016 presented by Christophe Hondelatte on Europe 1.

== See also ==
- List of serial killers by country
- Kidnapping
