= Battle of Brécourt =

- Part of French Revolutionary Wars
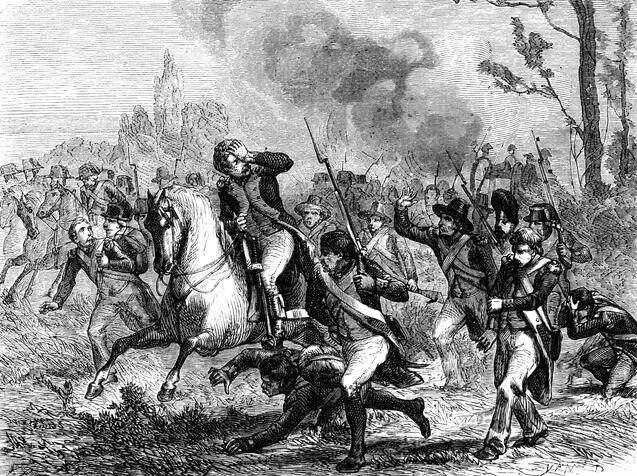
- The federalist insurgents routed at Vernon, engraving by Yan' Dargent, 1866.
| Date | 13–14 July 1793 |
| Location | Pacy-sur-Eure and the château de Brécourt 49°03′06″N 1°25′26″E |
| Result | Republican victory |

Belligerents
| Montagnard Convention | Federalists |

Commanders and leaders
| • Charles Sepher • Guillaume Brune | • Georges Félix de Wimpffen • Joseph de Puisaye |

Strength
| 1,200 men | 3,000 men |

Casualties and losses
| 1 dead | 8 dead |

The Battle of Brécourt or Battle of Vernon took place on 13–14 July 1793 between the National Convention and the federalists during the Federalist revolts. It marked the end of the federalist revolt in Normandy and in Brittany.

== Prelude ==
Since spring 1793 the National Convention had been split by rivalry between the Montagnards and Girondins, reaching the point of no return on 2 June, when the Montagnards (under pressure from the sans-culottes of Paris) voted for the arrest of the 29 Girondin deputies, who fled Paris and tried to start an uprising against the convention. Most of the departments simply sent a written anti-Montagnard protest to Paris, with only the Mediterranean coast, parts of Calvados (Caen) and Eure in Normandy (the rest of Normandy procrastinated or opted for a wait-and-see approach) and the areas around Lyon and Bordeaux opting for open revolt.

The Girondins placed Georges Félix de Wimpffen and Joseph de Puisaye in command of their forces. In early July their expedition set out from Caen for Paris, accusing the latter of being under the sans-culottes' control. Wimpffen was not with the small force (there were few volunteers since the harvest was imminent), mainly consisting of Bretons, leaving it under Puisaye's command. It passed via Eure's main town of Évreux - Puisaye had commanded that town's National Guard and still had some support there. The force then headed for Vernon, Eure, a town of 4,500 people on the Seine, to cut off Paris' food supply. On 13 July Puisaye stopped in his nearby castle of Ménilles but ordered the army to continue. The inhabitants of Vernon were worried by the federalist advance, even more so as they had few troops or supplies to defend the town. Before the assault the federalists decided to stop off at the château de Brécourt 8 kilometres from Vernon.

== Course ==
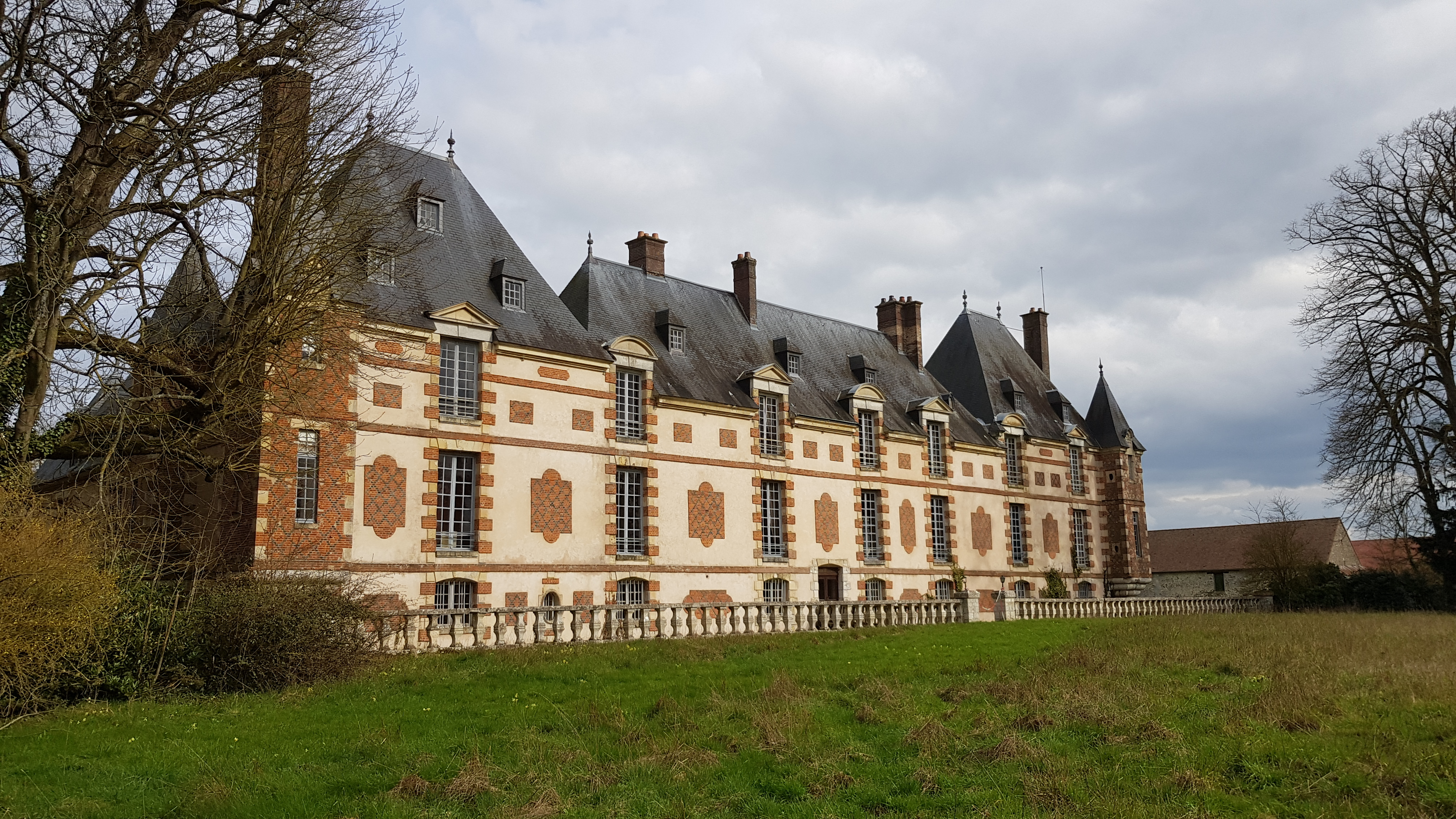
The château de Brécourt in 2018.

Hours passed and Vernon's inhabitants still did not see the enemy arrive, so instead went out to meet them. Arriving at the château de Brécourt, they fired their two perriers (their only artillery), sowing panic among the surprised federalists, who scattered and fled, withdrawing to Évreux then Lisieux.

Historians are astonished by how quickly the federalists were routed, especially as the inhabitants of Vernon only attacked with small forces. Puisaye's force may have been drunk after pillaging the château's wine cellars - Michel de Decker writes that the battlefield was full not of corpses but empty bottles.

On 14 April the Convention troops entered Pacy-sur-Eure, abandoning it on 15 April then reoccupying it on 16 April. The federalist force retired towards Bayeux.

Several historians state the battle was named "the battle without tears", since nobody was killed or wounded, although in a letter to the minister of war on 15 July 1793 general Louis François Peyre (an aide to the army staff) wrote a letter at Mantes telling the Minister of War that

On 13[th], towards 5 o'clock in the evening, the rebels, who were occupying Pacy with a force of 5,000, were attacked 1.5 leagues from Vernon by around 1,200 men. Despite their artillery fire, they were repulsed into the woods. Yesterday, on the 14[th], our troops entered Pacy. This morning the rebels, in greater numbers, forced the republicans to abandon Pacy. In these two actions, we lost one man, and the rebels eight.

== Results ==
The battle marked the end of the federalist revolt in Normandy, with the defeated troops scattering. Puisaye and others went into hiding, whilst Wimpffen and others retired to their estates and some of their former soldiers even joined the convention's forces, which advanced into an already peaceful Normandy against no resistance. This showed the lack of popular support for the federalist movement in Normandy and so on 2 August 1793 the revolts headquarters of Caen opened its gates. In the following months the popular societies and local administrations were purged of federalist sympathisers, with all blame placed on the Girondin deputies and moderation shown towards the other inhabitants of the province.

== Bibliography (in French) ==
- Savary, Jean Julien Michel (1824). Guerres des Vendéens et des Chouans contre la République (in French). Baudouin frères.
- Michel de Decker, « Brécourt 1793. Ni sang, ni larmes », Eure Inter magazine, no. 30, juin 1991.
- Boivin-Champeaux, Notes historiques sur la Révolution dans le département de l’Eure, 2 vol., 1893.
- Christine Le Bozec, La Normandie au XVIIIe siecle, Croissance, Lumières et Révolution, Rennes, Ouest-France Universités, 2002.
