= Poirson =

Poirson is a French surname. Notable people with the surname include:

- Brune Poirson (born 1982), French politician
- Charles-Gaspard Delestre-Poirson (1790–1859), French playwright and theatre director
- Louis Poirson (born 1962), Malagasy-French serial killer and rapist
- Victor-Armand Poirson (1858–1893), French illustrator and cartoonist
