= Federalist revolts =

1793 uprisings in Revolutionary France

- Part of the War of the First Coalition
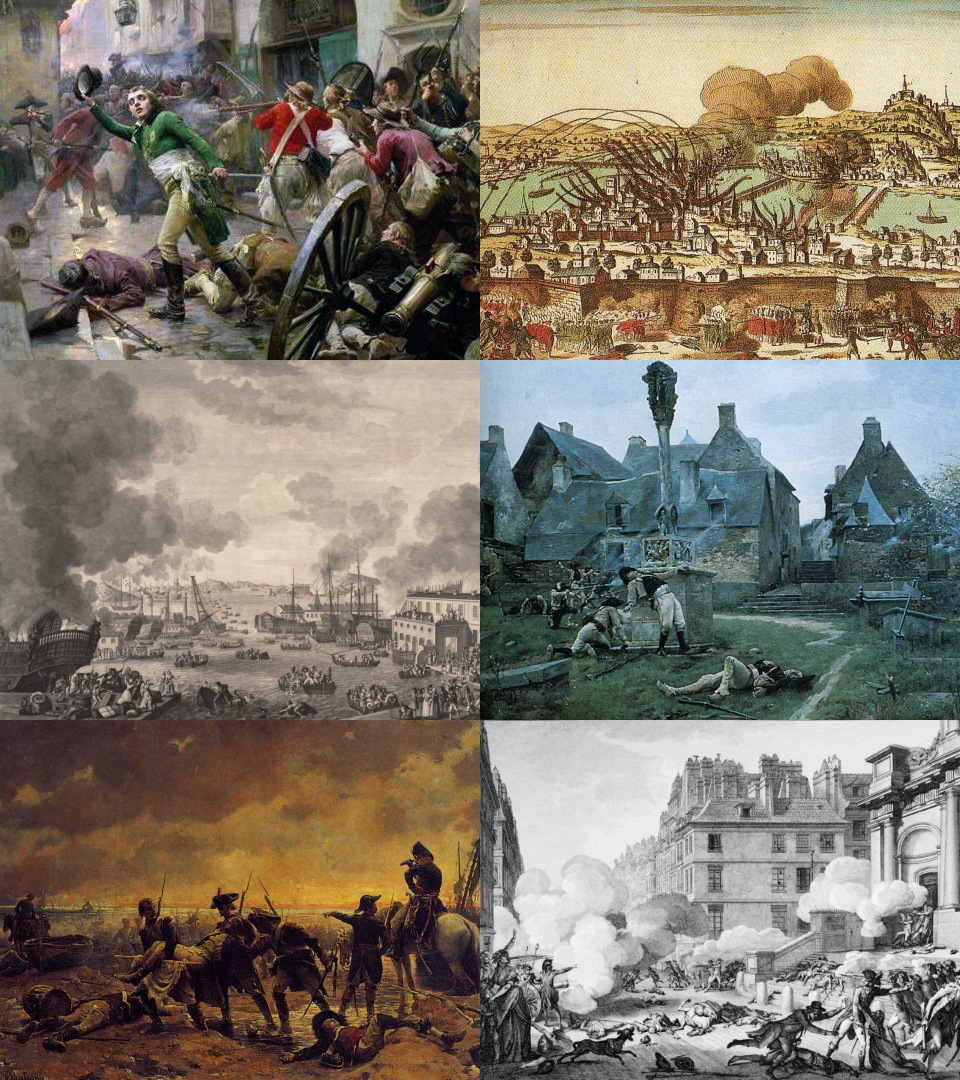
- Federalist revolts Click an image to load the appropriate article. Left to right, top to bottom: Battles of the Vendée, Lyon, Toulon, Chouannerie, Quiberon and 13 Vendémiaire
Date	2 June – 18 December 1793
Location	France
Result	Victory of the Convention

Belligerents
National Convention	Fédéralistes French Royalists

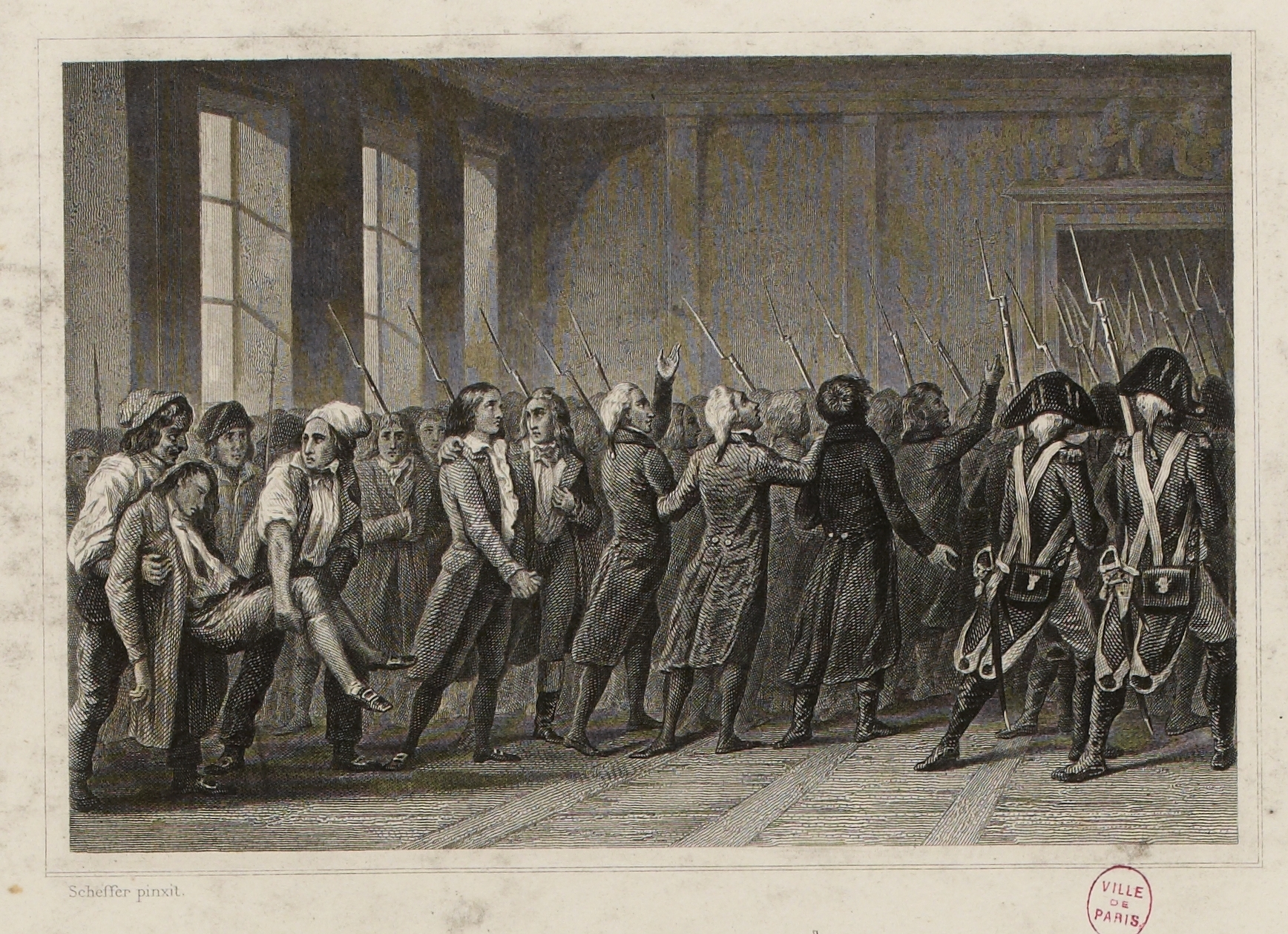
Arrest of the Girondins in the Convention on 2 June 1793

The Federalist revolts were uprisings that broke out in various parts of France in the summer of 1793, during the French Revolution. They were prompted by resentments in France's provincial cities about increasing centralisation of power in Paris, and increasing radicalisation of political authority in the hands of the Jacobins. In most of the country, the trigger for uprising was the exclusion of the Girondins from the National Convention after the Insurrection of 31 May – 2 June 1793. Although they shared common origins and political objectives, the revolts were not centrally organised or well-coordinated. The revolts were put down by the armies of the Convention over the following months. The Reign of Terror was then imposed across France to punish those associated with them and to enforce Jacobin ideology.

== Origins ==
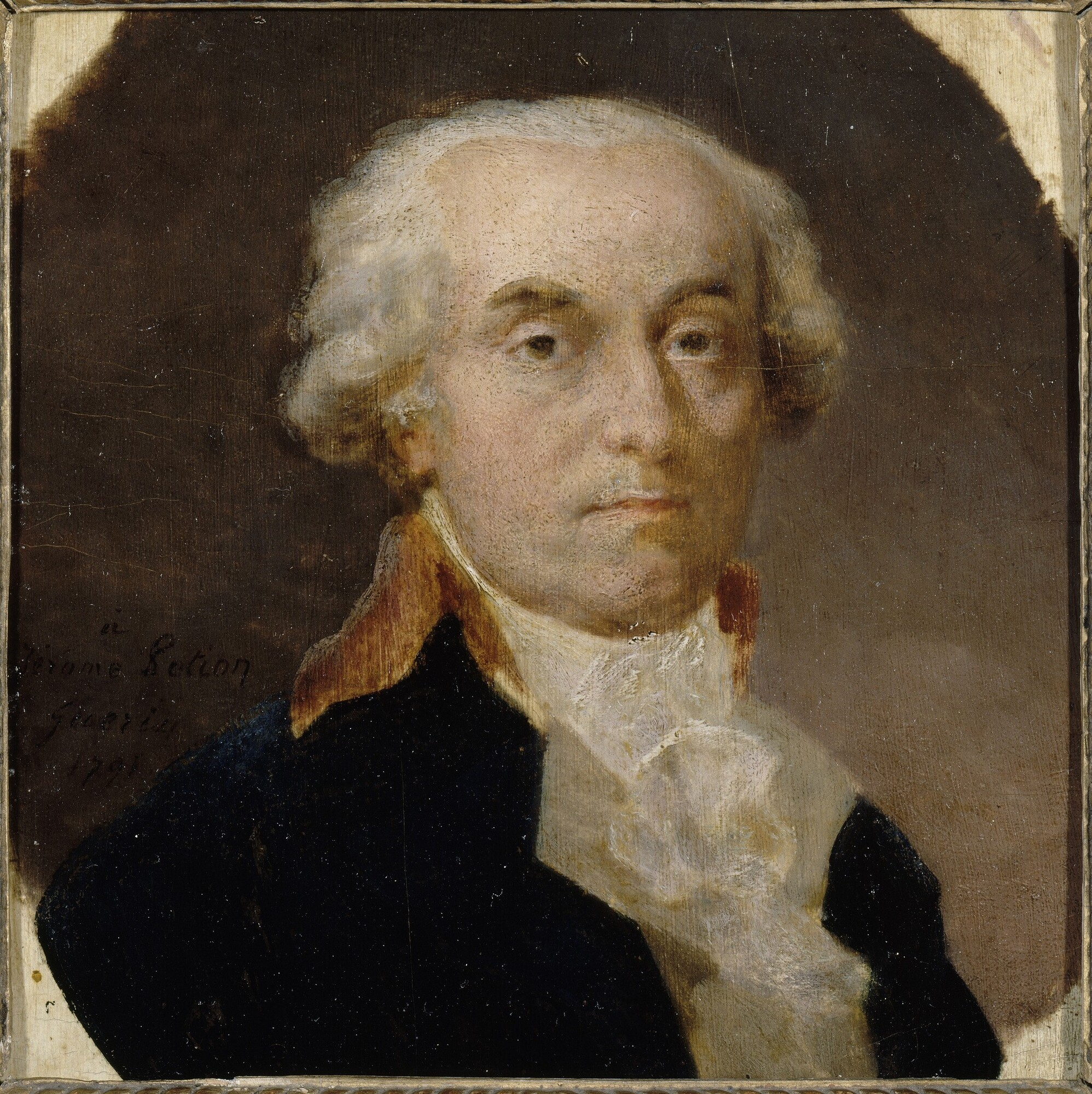
Jérôme Petion de Villeneuve, Federalist leader

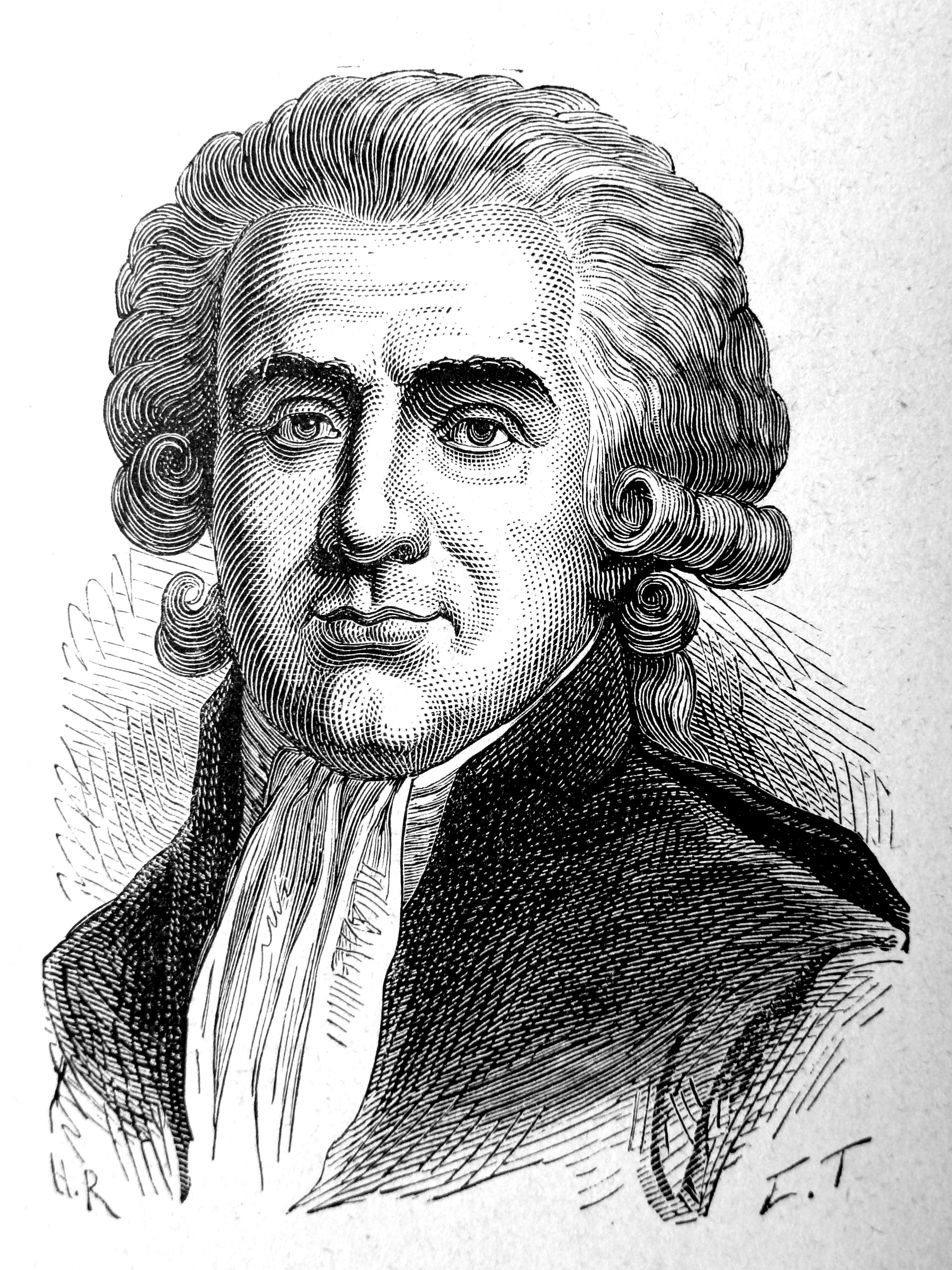
Jean-Paul Rabaut Saint-Etienne, Federalist leader

In 1793, facing repeated threats from the radical Paris Commune, the Girondins (sometimes referred to as "federalists" because of their ideas about decentralising power) began preparing a resistance movement outside Paris in the regions where they had significant support. In many parts of the country, local and departmental governments were still dominated by the same notable families who had run them before the Revolution, and they often held Girondist, or even royalist, political views. At the same time, the Girondins' political opponents in Paris, the Jacobins, also sought to mobilise the population outside the capital to resist this local establishment and mobilise the people for a radical egalitarian Republic.This led to violent confrontations, exacerbated by underlying social conflicts, in Lyon, Marseille, Bordeaux, Nantes and Rouen, towns where each faction had a strong social base—part of the middle classes and the urban poor supported the Jacobins, while Girondin support was strong among the more prosperous bourgeoisie and those elements of the urban poor affected by unemployment or hostile to the anticlerical measures of the Convention.

In most affected cities, the crisis broke after 29 Girondin députés were arrested on 2 June 1793. On 5 June, another 17 députés, including Nicolas de Condorcet, protested against their arrest. The same day, the départemental administrations of Somme, Haute-Vienne and Hautes-Alpes did likewise. On 7 June, 75 députés from the right of the Convention denounced the actions of the Paris Commune and urged the départements across the country to support them. Meanwhile, several of the Girondin députés escaped house arrest and fled to join the armed groups which most Norman and Breton départements had begun to assemble in order to raise a revolt against the Convention. For example, députés François Buzot and Antoine Joseph Gorsas went to Eure, while Jérôme Pétion and many others reached Caen, which was to become their headquarters. Meanwhile, Jacques Pierre Brissot went to Moulins, Jean-Paul Rabaut Saint-Étienne to Nîmes, François Trophime Rebecqui to Marseille, and Jean-Baptiste Birotteau and Charles Antoine Chasset to Lyon.

In these large towns, the local notables and large merchants, strong Girondin supporters, could muster sufficient influence and support to prevent the Jacobins in the towns from taking over. However, they lacked the numbers in the smaller towns to break to hegemony of the radical political clubs that wanted to remain loyal to the Convention, heeding appeals for the unity of patriots against counter-revolution and invasion, and welcoming the popular new Constitution of Year I.

The insurrection had three main regional centres: the West (Normandy and Brittany, principally in the towns of Rennes and Caen), the South East (Lyon, Marseille and Toulon) and the South West (Bordeaux).

== Normandy and Brittany ==
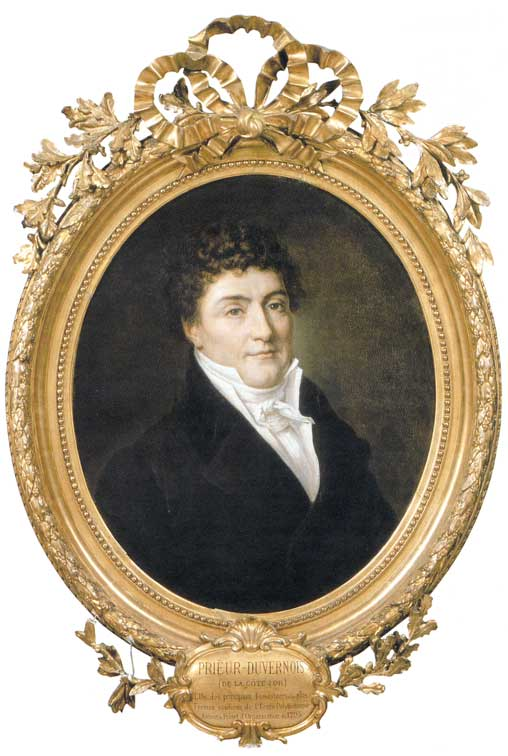
Prieur de la Côte d'Or, representative of the Convention in Normandy

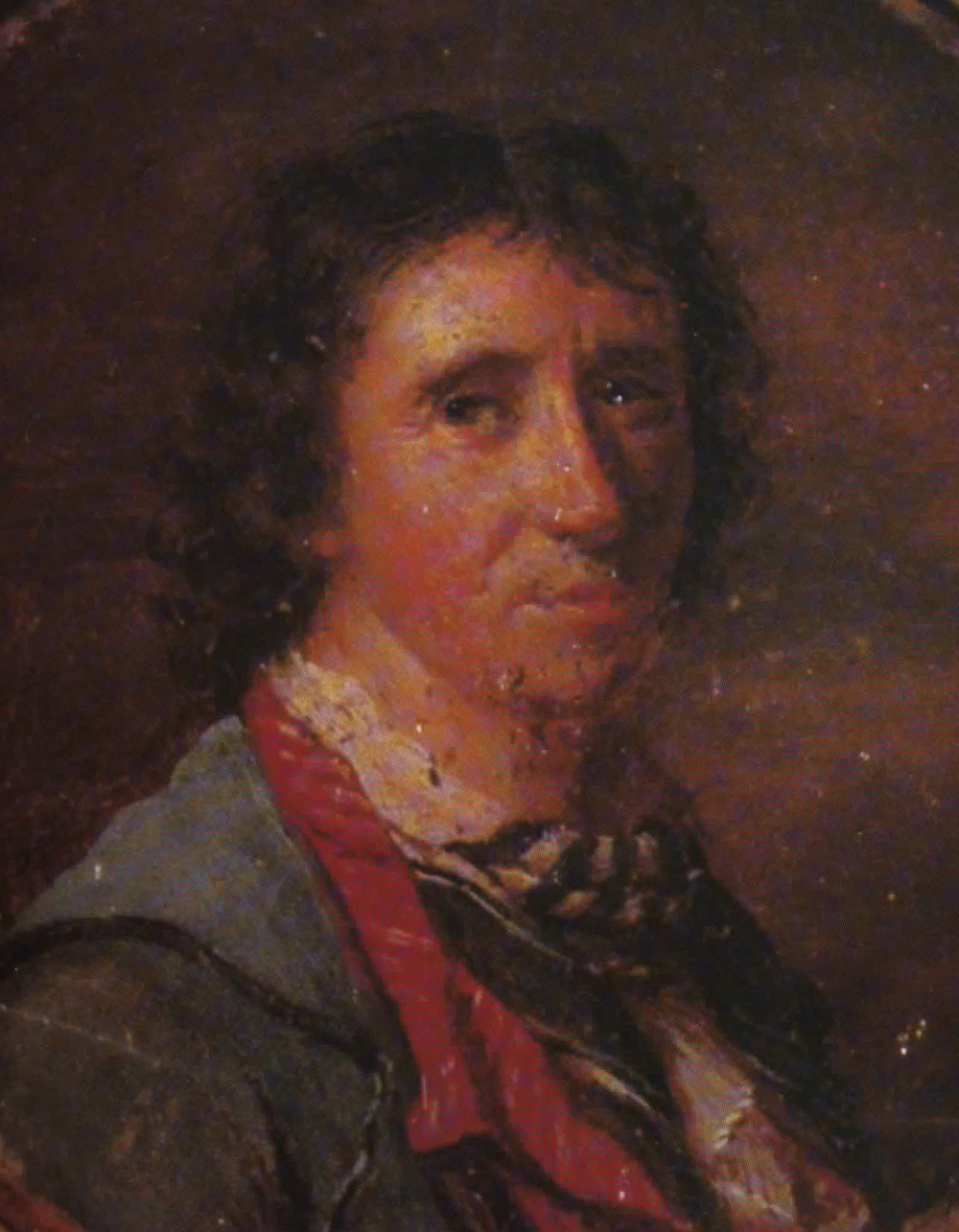
Jean-Baptiste Carrier, representative of the Convention in Brittany

On 9 June, the two représantants en mission from the Convention in Normandy, Gilbert Romme and Prieur de la Côte d'Or, were arrested in Caen by Federalists and held hostage for the duration of the rebellion against the safety of the proscribed Girondin leaders. On 13 June, led by Buzot and Gorsas, Eure gave the signal for insurrection, declaring that the Convention was no longer a free body, calling for the muster of 4,000 men to march on Paris and sending commissioners out to neighbouring départements to encourage them to rise, too.

In Ille-et-Vilaine, the département and the town government of Rennes, formed a central committee to coordinate protests. It was soon joined by delegates from Finistère and Morbihan. Côtes-du-Nord decided it was more important to send volunteers to defend Nantes, threatened by the Vendéan rebels, than to send men to Normandy. It was only after the Battle of Nantes that the authorities in Côtes-du-Nord decided to send just forty volunteers, while Nantes itself sent 64. Overall, the Bretons sent just 1,700 men into Normandy.

In Maine-et-Loire, the quartering of Convention troops in Laval as well as the presence of two loyal members of the Convention, Pierre-Marie Delaunay and Jacques Dandenac, prevented a gathering of citizens on 7 June who wanted to sign up to join a Federalist departmental battalion formed by Mayenne. However, this force eventually left for Caen on 4 July to join other Federalist units and volunteers coming from the Breton départements.

In Caen, now the headquarters of the Federalist revolt in the West, Buzot, Guadet, Pétion, Barbaroux, Louvet, Salle and other Girondins formed a central assembly for resistance to oppression, swearing hatred of anarchists and promising to maintain equality, unity, and the indivisibility of the Republic. They appointed General Georges Félix de Wimpffen, who had successfully defended Thionville against the Duke of Brunswick the year before, as commander of their départemental militias.

Wimpffen gathered a Federalist army of 5,000 men and, placing Puisaye in command of the vanguard, marched off towards Évreux. Against them, the Convention sent a small force of just 1,500 men, which engaged them on the evening of 13 July near Pacy-sur-Eure. The Federalist column, taken by surprise, broke and fled at the first sound of cannon—there were neither deaths nor injuries on either side. This encounter became known as the Battle of Brécourt. Wimpffen was unable to rally his troops, who began deserting or defecting to the Convention. The Bretons decided to go home, taking with them the Girondin leaders from Caen. After this, the Federalist revolt quickly dissipated in Normandy. On 29 July, Gilbert Romme and Prieur de la Côte d'Or were freed unharmed, and Caen opened its gates to the Convention army on 2 August, effectively bringing the revolt to an end there.

The same day as the Battle of Brécourt, Charlotte Corday, inspired by the Federalists in Caen, assassinated Jean-Paul Marat in Paris. Despite the intensity of the feeling stirred up by his death and Corday's execution soon after, the Convention did not impose punishments on Normandy as it later did on Lyon and Marseille. Romme and Prieur de la Côte d'Or ensured that the local clubs were not suppressed—indeed, during the Reign of Terror, there were no executions at all in Caen. The loss of the Jacobin hero was, however, commemorated in Normandy on 19 November, when the city of Le Havre-de-Grâce changed its name to Le Havre-de-Marat (later, Le Havre-Marat).

In Brittany, the fleeing Girondin leaders arrived at Quimper on 8 August but found little support for their insurrection, even among a peasantry with strong monarchist tendencies and a hatred of the levée en masse. Saint-Malo prepared to defect to the British as Toulon had done, but Convention forces were able to take control quickly and prevent this. On 21 September, Petion, Barbaroux and the others abandoned Brittany, sailing from the port of Lanvéoc to Bordeaux, where they intended to continue their struggle.

The Convention sent Jean-Baptiste Carrier to Rennes to re-establish order. He arrived on 1 September and remained until 5 or 6 October, when he left for Nantes. In the intervening five weeks, he rallied the local Jacobins and comprehensively purged Federalists, Girondins and monarchists from every public office. There were no executions under his command, although counter-revolutionaries were locked up in various local prisons—the most "dangerous" being confined to Mont Saint Michel for maximum security—and others sent to Paris for trial. He waged a particularly intense campaign against the local clergy and had plans for a "noyade" (mass drowning), as he was later to undertake at Nantes, but he could not put his plan into effect because any vessel leaving Saint-Malo would have been easily captured by the British fleet which was standing out to sea, imposing a blockade. After Carrier's departure, his replacement, François-Joachim Esnue-Lavallée released most of the people he had imprisoned.

Early in 1794, a new revolt, the Chouannerie, broke out in Brittany and nearby départements.

== Lyon ==
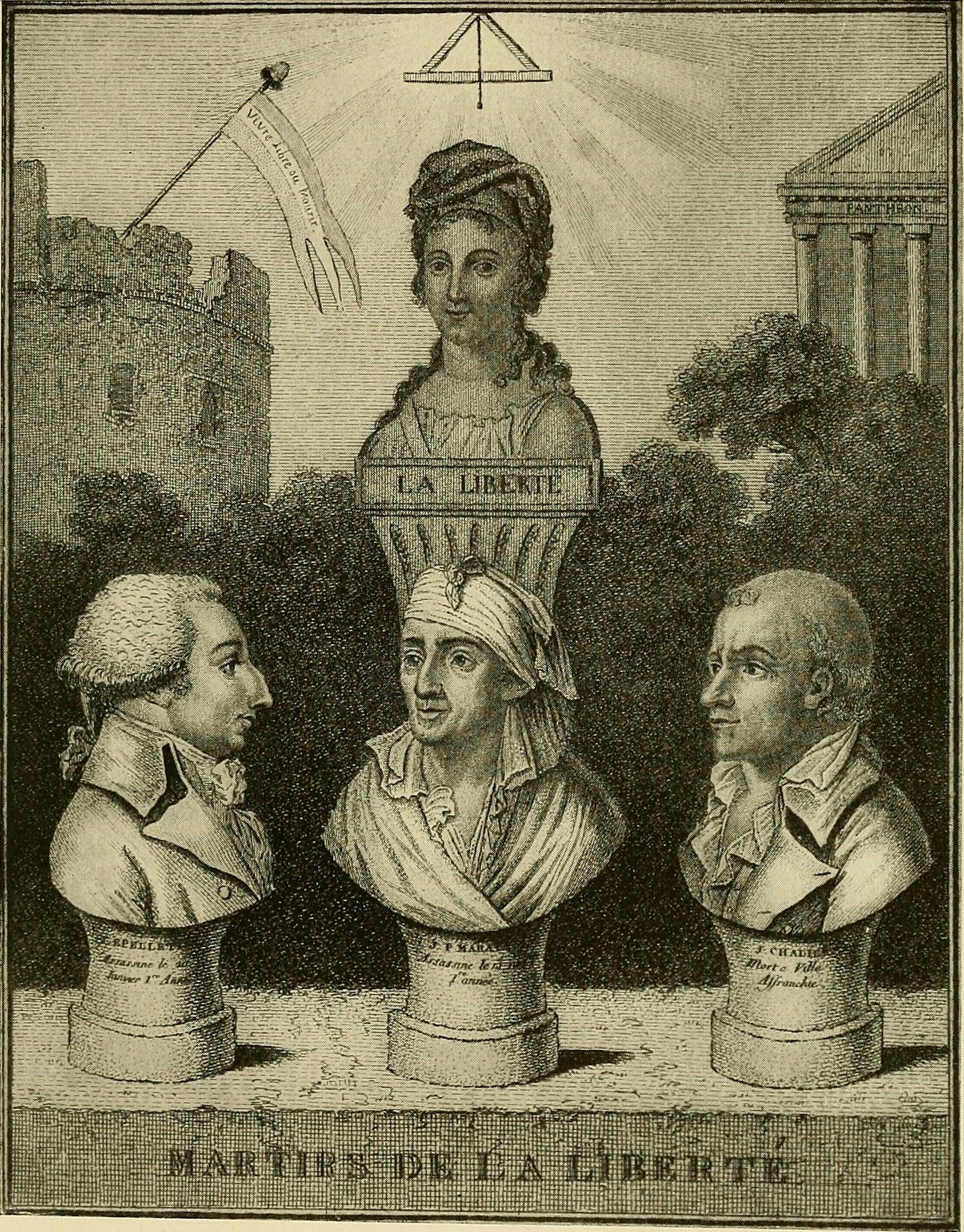
Contemporary print showing Lyon Jacobin Joseph Chalier as a martyr for Liberty, together with Marat and Le Peletier de St Fargeau (all assassinated in 1793)

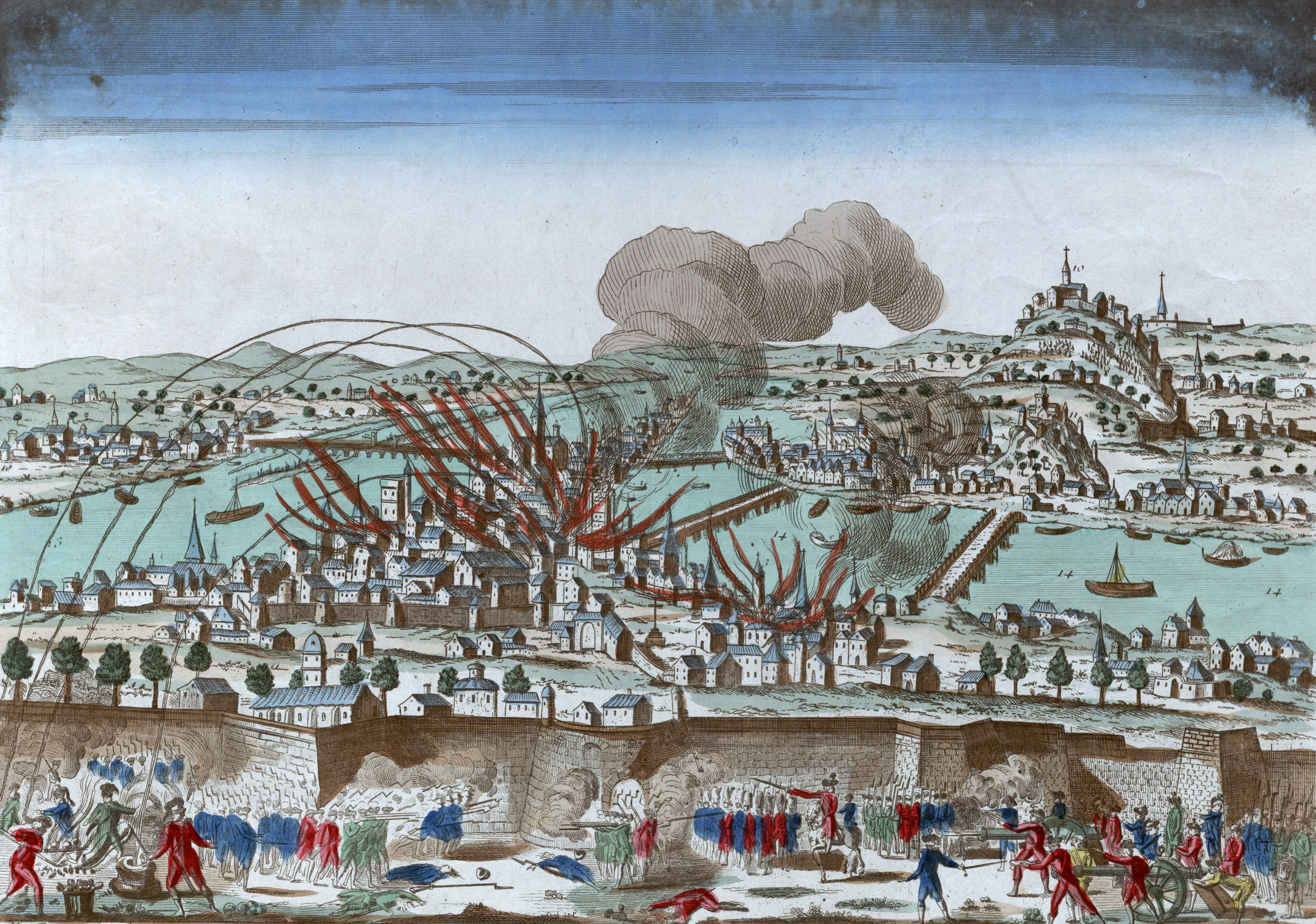
Siege of Lyon (1793)

Lyon was the second-largest city in France after Paris, where factional tension ran very high in the first half of 1793. As in Marseilles, most of the sections supported the Girondins, but a small and determined group of Jacobins was intent on taking power in the city under their charismatic but divisive leader, Joseph Chalier. On 9 March the Jacobins effectively gained control of the city.

On 29 May a meeting of the sections decided to replace the Jacobin Council government. fr:Jean-Pierre Gauthier and fr:Pierre-Claude Nioche, représentants en mission from the national government, arrived and were placed under guard. During the night Chalier's partisans were arrested and the following day a man named Coindre became mayor. Chalier and his friends were put on trial.

In the days following the arrest of the Girondin deputés in Paris, the Convention saw developments in Lyon as part of a more widespread revolt threatening the authority of central government. Indeed, within the month the municipal leaders in Lyon were linking up both with neighbouring departments and with other "insurgent cities" in the French south, Marseille, Nîmes and Bordeaux. Lyon now called for a meeting among the potentially separatist municipalities and departments to be convened at Bourges, as an alternative to the Convention. Unlike the Federalist towns in Normandy and Brittany which had barely managed to raise a few hundred men, Lyon had a substantial force of some 10,000 men under arms, commanded by royalists led by the Count of Précy.

The Convention sent Robert Lindet to negotiate with the leaders in Lyon, but he found the local representatives in an uncompromising mood: intransigence was stiffened by the presence at Lyon of Jean Bonaventure Birotteau, one of the recently expelled Girondist deputés. On 30 June 1793, 207 delegates representing nearby cantons, the department and the urban districts appointed a "Popular Republican Commission for the Public Safety of Rhône-et-Loire", which published an "Address from the authorities duly constituted at Lyon to the armies, the citizens and all the departments in the republic". The National Convention responded with a series of decrees on 12 and 14 July 1793. They declared Birotteau an outlaw, dismissed the Lyon leaders, confiscating their assets; and they ordered the Army of the Alps to re-establish order in Lyon.

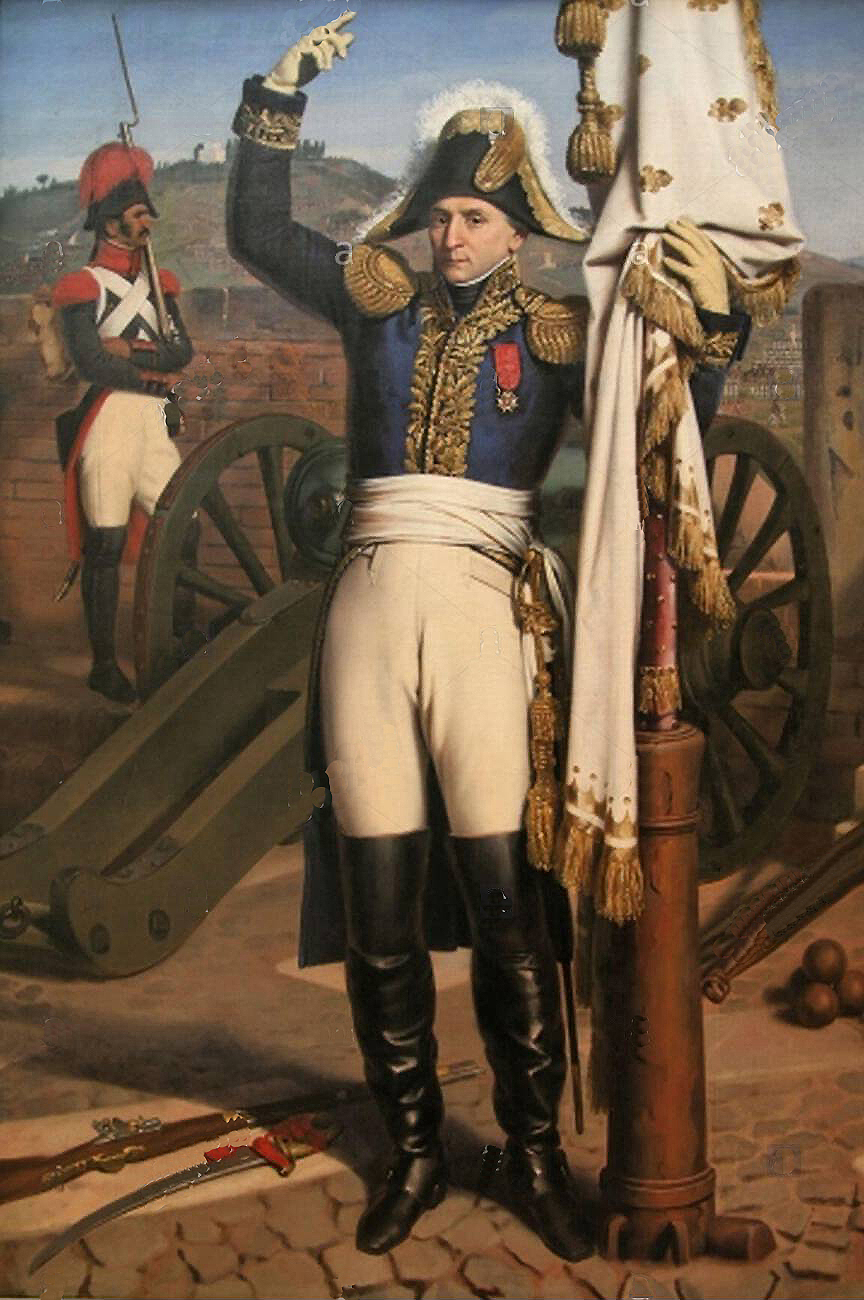
The comte de Précy, Federalist commander

The Federalist authorities in Lyon, incited by threats from Paris, executed Chalier on 16 July, along with several of his associates. As the army of the Convention under Kellermann, approached, they prepared for a siege, but their calls for assistance to other parts of France went unheeded. The comte de Précy strengthened the redoubts and mobilised an army of between 12,000 and 14,000 men.

The siege of Lyon began on 7 August, but the army of the Convention was not able to achieve a complete blockade until 17 September. After the defenders repulsed initial attacks on the fortifications, Kellermann decided to bombard the city into submission. He began firing directly into the city on the night of 22 August and the bombardment was kept up until the city finally surrendered. Kellermann was replaced at the end of September by Doppet, who was able to gradually tighten his grip on the city until it surrendered on 9 October.

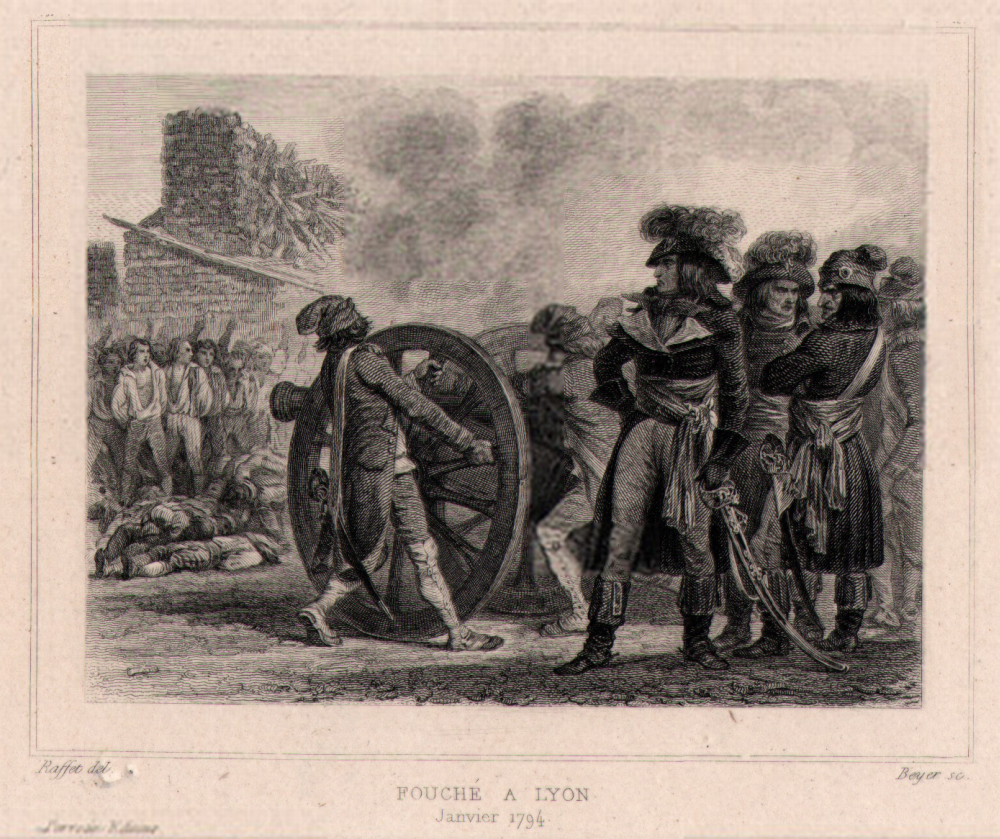
Fouché executing Federalist prisoners in Lyon with cannon

On 12 October Barère boasted "Lyon made war in Liberty; Lyon is no more." Lyon was abolished and renamed "Ville-affranchie" ("liberated town"). A total of 1,604 people were shot or guillotined and a number of grand buildings around the place Bellecour were torn down.

The bombardment of the city and the reprisals after it was retaken promoted an exodus of its people. With around 150,000 inhabitants in 1793 Lyon had only 102,000 in 1794, and just 88,000 in 1800. The Jacobin repression led to the deaths of 115 of the 400 businessmen who ran silk spinning concerns, while many of the master craftsmen in the sector also abandoned the city.

Given the scale and ferocity of the Convention's reprisals against Lyon, it is not surprising that during the First White Terror widespread hatred of Jacobins led to many acts of collective violence. On a number of occasions, including 2 February 1795, the mob broke into prisons and massacred of Jacobin prisoners held there. On 14 February Joseph Fernex, a judge on the former Revolutionary Committee, in prison since Thermidor, was killed and thrown into the Rhône by a mob. On 1 March another member of the Revolutionary Committee, Sautemouche, was killed. On 30 March 1795 the threat of another massacre of Jacobin prisoners was so great that the decision was taken to move them out of the city to Roanne and Mâcon. Nevertheless, on 4 April, several thousand rioters broke into the jails and killed 99 Jacobin prisoners.

== Marseille ==
At Marseille, Jacobins loyal to the Convention held the town hall and the club on the rue Thubaneau. The Girondins, the old notable families and prosperous merchants, were well-represented at the more local level in the sectional assemblies. To balance this influence, the Jacobins had sought, since 1792, to create an armed force of 6,000 men and a judicial committee they could control. The Girondin sections demanded a revolutionary tribunal which the Jacobins did not control. The conflict between these two camps hardened in early 1793, to the point where the représentants en mission sent from Paris to raise an army through the levée en masse, Moyse Bayle and fr:Joseph Antoine Boisset, had to take refuge in Montélimar.

After the Insurrection of 31 May – 2 June 1793 in Paris, the Girondins in Marseille created a general committee of sections which broke up the Jacobin club and imprisoned its leaders, before trying and executing them in July. A new town council was elected, which linked up with other Federalist areas and decided to raise an army of its own. This army seized Avignon on 8 July.

The response in the départements around Marseille was mixed. In Hérault, the town council of Montpellier condemned the arrest of the Girondins and on 20 June created a Committee of Public Safety for the département; within days a decree of the Convention had ordered the arrest of its members. Hérault decided not to raise its own army however. Gard was the only département to raise an army, a battalion of 600 men who occupied Pont-Saint-Esprit to maintain communications with Lyon. Drôme remained loyal to the Convention, with the Jacobins in Valence preventing the Federalists from Gard from moving north to join up with Lyon on 24, 25 and 26 June. Thanks to their assistance, a detachment from the Army of the Alps under General Carteaux, sent by the Convention to restore order, was able to enter Avignon, where the Jacobin town authorities were re-established on 25 July.

Faced with Carteaux's forces, a number of citizens in Marseille abandoned the Federalist cause, leaving it increasingly in the hands of outright monarchists. On 20 August they made contact with Admiral Hood, commander of the British fleet blockading the city, to appeal for food to be allowed in. Before these negotiations came to anything, Carteaux retook the town on 25 August, supported by an uprising among the Jacobin elements in the city.

In Marseille the repression which followed the Federalist defeat echoed that of Lyon. The city was renamed "ville sans nom" ("town with no name") on 28 August and Carteroux set up a revolutionary tribunal that began the Terror in Provence. In the autumn of 1793 Barras and Fréron extended the repression and there were a number of executions in October on the Canebière. In total, between August 1793 and April 1794, the Revolutionary Tribunal in Marseille tried 975 suspects and acquitted 476 of them; 289 of those convicted were actually executed.

The harsh repressions of the Convention forces did not mark the end of the political violence in Marseille. During the First White Terror in 1795 there were many revenge attacks on Jacobins. Notably, on 5 June that year, 700 Jacobin prisoners were massacred in the prison of Saint Jean fort. Similar revenge actions took place in other former Federalist towns across the South East - for example on 27 June 1795 members of the former Revolutionary Tribunal at Orange were killed and thrown into the Rhône.

== Toulon ==
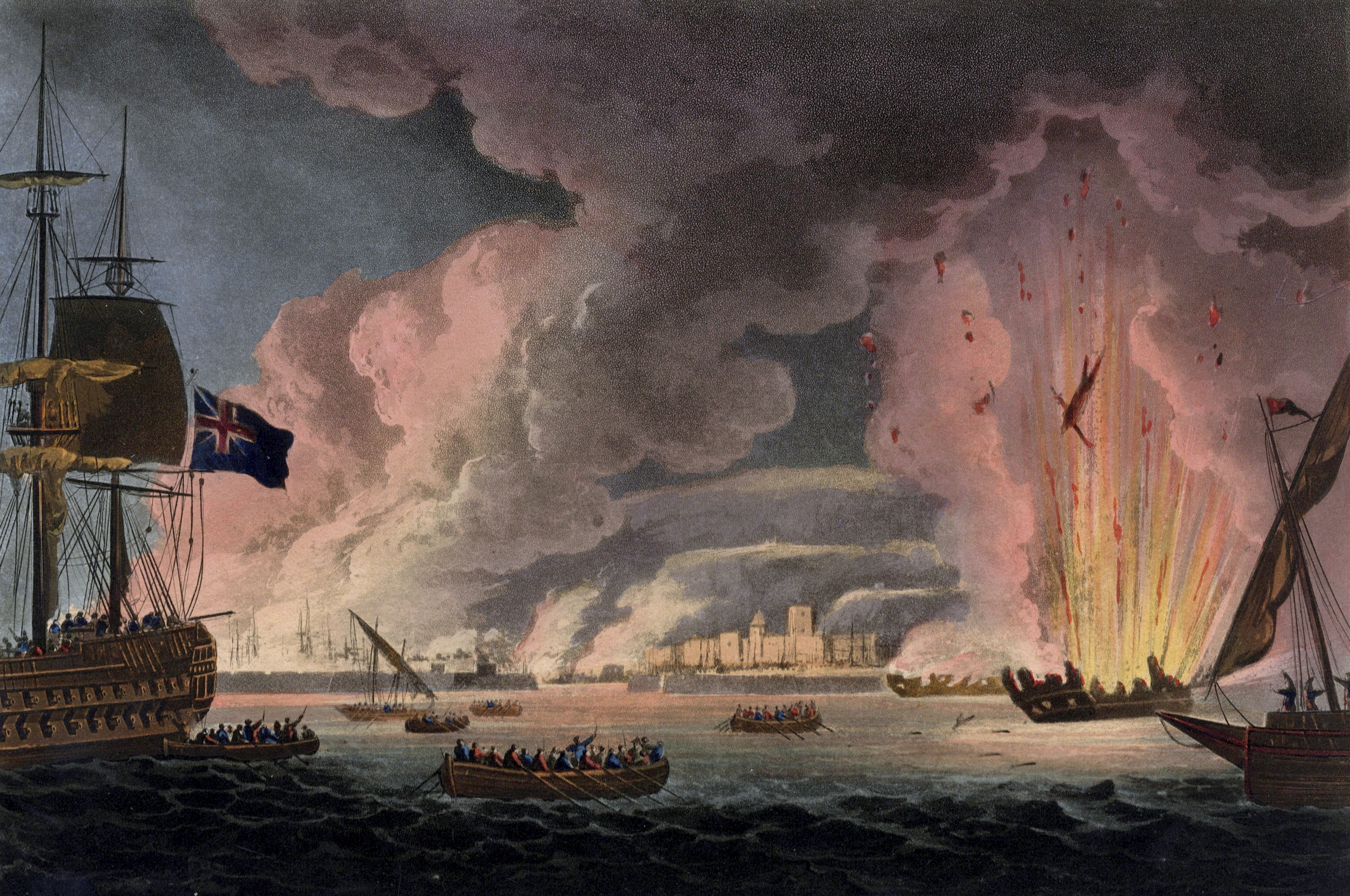
Destruction of the French fleet at Toulon

Although Toulon had been a bastion of Jacobin support until July 1793, the Jacobins were swept out of power by Girondin sections in the second half of the month; the Jacobin club was sacked, various leading figures were obliged to flee, and those who did not flee were rounded up and held on a pontoon in the harbour. As in Normandy, the Convention's two représentants en mission were arrested and locked up. The loss of Toulon was a disaster for the Republic as almost the entirety of France's Mediterranean fleet was anchored in the port at the time.

The arrival of Carteaux at Marseille was followed by a royalist takeover in Toulon; the new leaders of the city then surrendered it to the British and their Spanish and Neapolitan allies on 18 August. Carteaux arrived outside Toulon on 8 September and began a lengthy siege - in which the young Napoleon Bonaparte distinguished himself - which lasted until 19 December 1793. Before withdrawing, the British towed away many French battleships and blew up many of those remaining. Around 7,000 refugees left Toulon, including the leaders of the revolt against the Convention, packed into the remaining ships that left with the departing British fleet. The victorious Montagnards renamed the city as Port-la-Montagne.

== Bordeaux ==
The revolt in Bordeaux was of a different nature to those in Lyon, Marseille or Toulon. Bordeaux was the home city of many of the Girondin leaders, and while it had fairly conservative views, neither the radical Republican left nor the monarchist right had any substantial following. The months leading up to the arrest of the Girondin deputés did not see Bordeaux divided by the kinds of bitter political strife that marked the cities of the South East; and once the city joined the revolt, there was an enduring consensus which supported the Federalist leadership.

The differences of view between Bordeaux and Paris were sufficiently deep that the city did not wait until the arrest of the Gironde deputés to declare itself insurrectionary. That occurred on 9 May 1793 when the city's sections issued a declaration that the Convention had even taken over by anarchists. At this stage however the efforts of the Federalists were focused on finding ways of restoring the freedom of debate within the Convention they said had been lost.

When the arrest of the Girondin deputés rendered this position untenable, the next step was for the authorities in the département of Gironde to declare themselves insurrectionary on 7 June 1793. They began raising an army, and sought to unite forces with the députés based in Bourges. On 10 June they constituted a new body, the Commission populaire du salut publique de la Gironde (People's commission for public safety of the Gironde) which assumed the powers of government in the city and its environs, as well as sending out messages to neighbouring départements calling for unity. As it had done with Lyon, the Convention responded by sending two commissioners to Bordeaux, Jean Baptiste Treilhard and Jean-Baptiste Charles Matthieu, to see whether Bordeaux could be persuaded to abandon its course of action. The city made its hostility clear to them. The Federalists considered holding the commissioners hostage as their counterparts in Normandy had done, but eventually decided against this. Instead, they escorted them to the boundary of the département and sent them on their way.

Despite the broad support for the Federalists in the city, it proved remarkably difficult for the insurrectionaries to recruit people to actively support their cause. The attempt to raise an army and march on Paris produced a force of just 400 men, who reached Langon. Here, less than 50 km from Bordeaux, their numbers depleted by desertions, they learned that Commissioners from the Convention had arrived at Bordeaux, and promptly disbanded themselves.

Faced with this abject military failure, on 2 August the Federalist Commission populaire dissolved itself, four days before it was outlawed by the Convention and its members declared traitors. Whereas the others Federalist cities were taken by force or surrendered to the armies of the Convention, in Bordeaux no military force was employed to end the Federalist revolt. Two new commissioners sent by the Convention, Claude-Alexandre Ysabeau and Marc Antoine Baudot, arrived unescorted on 18 August. However the crowds that greeted them were so hostile they decided to leave a once rather than stay in Bordeaux, so they went to La Réole and reported to the Convention on the mood in the city. There they were soon joined by two new commissioners, Jean-Lambert Tallien and fr:Guillaume Chaudron-Rousseau, who brought instructions from Paris to impose revolutionary order in no uncertain terms.

Lacking the military means to achieve this, the four commissioners isolated Bordeaux by persuading the neighbouring areas from selling food to the city, and by working with the small Jacobin faction in the city to prepare the ground for their return. As hunger spread in Bordeaux, the radical section Francklin took the lead, on 9 September, by demanding that the Convention's decrees against the Federalist authorities of the city be enforced. Over the next few days others in the city rallied to them, and on 18 September the city's sections gathered to dismiss the city's authorities. A pro-Convention provisional city council was set up, and local surveillance committees - a key part of the infrastructure of the Reign of Terror - were established across the city. With the city now securely in the hands of politically reliable elements, the four Convention commissioners were able to re-enter Bordeaux on 16 October, this time accompanied by 3,000 infantry and cavalry. In the following weeks the apparatus of the Terror was set up in the city. A military commission held 157 sessions to hear cases against those accused of crimes against the Republic; of its 832 verdicts, 304 were acquittals, 237 were sentences of corporal punishment or detention, and 291 were death sentences. However, despite the bloodthirsty rhetoric of Tallien, the military commission acquitted more suspects than it actually sent to the scaffold; between October 1793 and June 1794 only 104 executions took place.

== Consequences ==
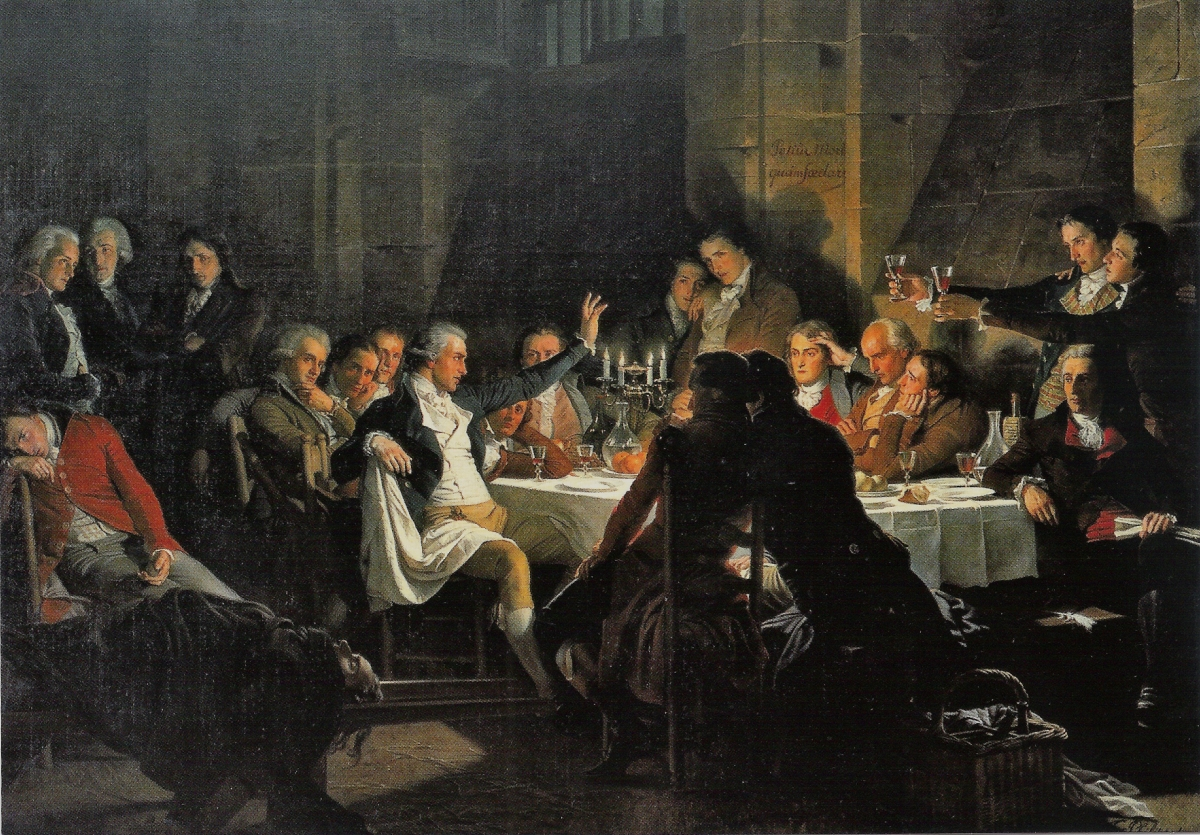
The Last Banquet of the Girondins by Henri Félix Emmanuel Philippoteaux, 1850. Girondin prisoners eat their last dinner together in prison before their execution

The Federalist revolt, violently suppressed by the Convention, prompted the strengthening of the Terror and increasing centralisation of power. Armed with dictatorial powers, the représentants en mission managed to put down unrest, but in the process the decentralisation intended in the Constitution of 1791 could not be realised. On 24 October 1793 the trial began of those Girondin/Federalist leaders who had been captured. Of the twenty-two brought to trial, all were found guilty and all were sent to the guillotine on 31 October.

Of those who remained at large, some were captured and executed individually. Others, including Barbaroux, Buzot, Condorcet, Grangeneuve, Guadet, Kersaint, Pétion, Roland and Rebecqui, committed suicide. Only a few escaped, including Jean-Baptiste Louvet de Couvrai.
