= Domaine of Villarceaux =

French château, water garden and park

Coordinates: 49°7′23″N 1°42′21″E

The Domaine of Villarceaux is a French château, water garden and park located in the commune of Chaussy in the Val d'Oise Department of France, 65 kilometers northwest of Paris.

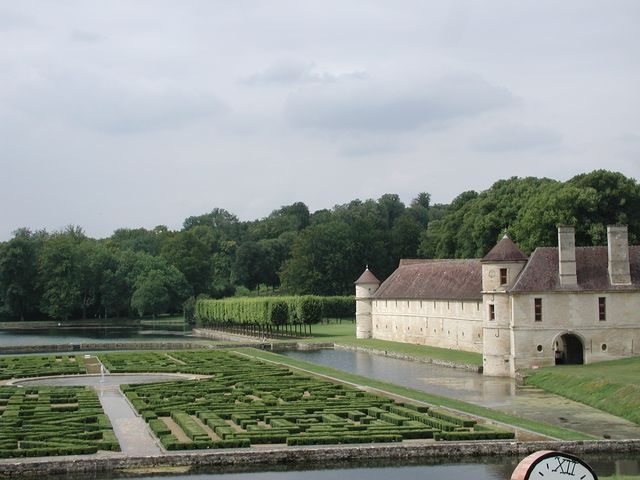
Domaine de Villarceaux, The manor and water garden

The Domaine is currently managed by the Regional Council of the 'Île-de-France for 99 years, on an agreement with the owners of the domaine, the Fondation Charles Leopold Mayer. The park contains a manor house from the 16th century and a château in the style of Louis XV from the 18th century. The gardens are classified among the Notable Gardens of France.

The gardens contain a rare 18th-century ornamental feature called a vertugadin (eng: farthingale), modelled after the hoop skirts of the 18th century, surrounded by statues brought from Italy.

== History ==
The gardens are located on the site of a medieval castle from the 11th century, built to protect France from the British, who at that time occupied Normandy, the neighboring province. Many vestiges of the medieval fortifications remain in the park. A manor house and French water garden was built there in the 17th century. In the 18th century a château in the style of Louis XV was built on a rocky hill overlooking the water garden.

One famous resident in the 17th century was Ninon de Lenclos, the author, courtesan, and patron of the arts. Another was Françoise d'Aubigné, the future Madame de Maintenon and future wife of King Louis XIV, who lived there after the death of her first husband, the poet Paul Scarron, at the invitation of her friends the Montchevreuil, cousins of the Marquis of Villarceaux. The Marquis fell in love with her, and commissioned a full-length portrait of her, nude, which greatly embarrassed her. The portrait can be seen today in the dining room of the house. The house also contains a collection of 18th-century furniture.

The domaine has been classified as an historic monument of France since 1941. It is part of the regional park of Vexin, and is used for concerts and cultural events.

== Bibliography ==
- Françoise Chandernagor, L’allée du roi : souvenirs de Françoise d’Aubigné, marquise de Maintenon, épouse du Roi de France, Paris, Julliard, 1995 ISBN 2-266-06787-7
