= François Rebecqui =

French politician (1744-1794)

François Trophime Rebecqui, born September 2, 1744 in Marseille, died in the same city on May 1, 1794, was a Girondin politician.

He was the deputy for the Bouches-du-Rhône department at the National Convention during the French Revolution. After the insurrection of 31 May – 2 June 1793 he went to Marseille to lead the Federalist revolt there, and committed suicide the next year after the revolt was suppressed.
