= Siege of Thionville (1792) =

1792 siege during the War of the First Coalition

- Part of the War of the First Coalition
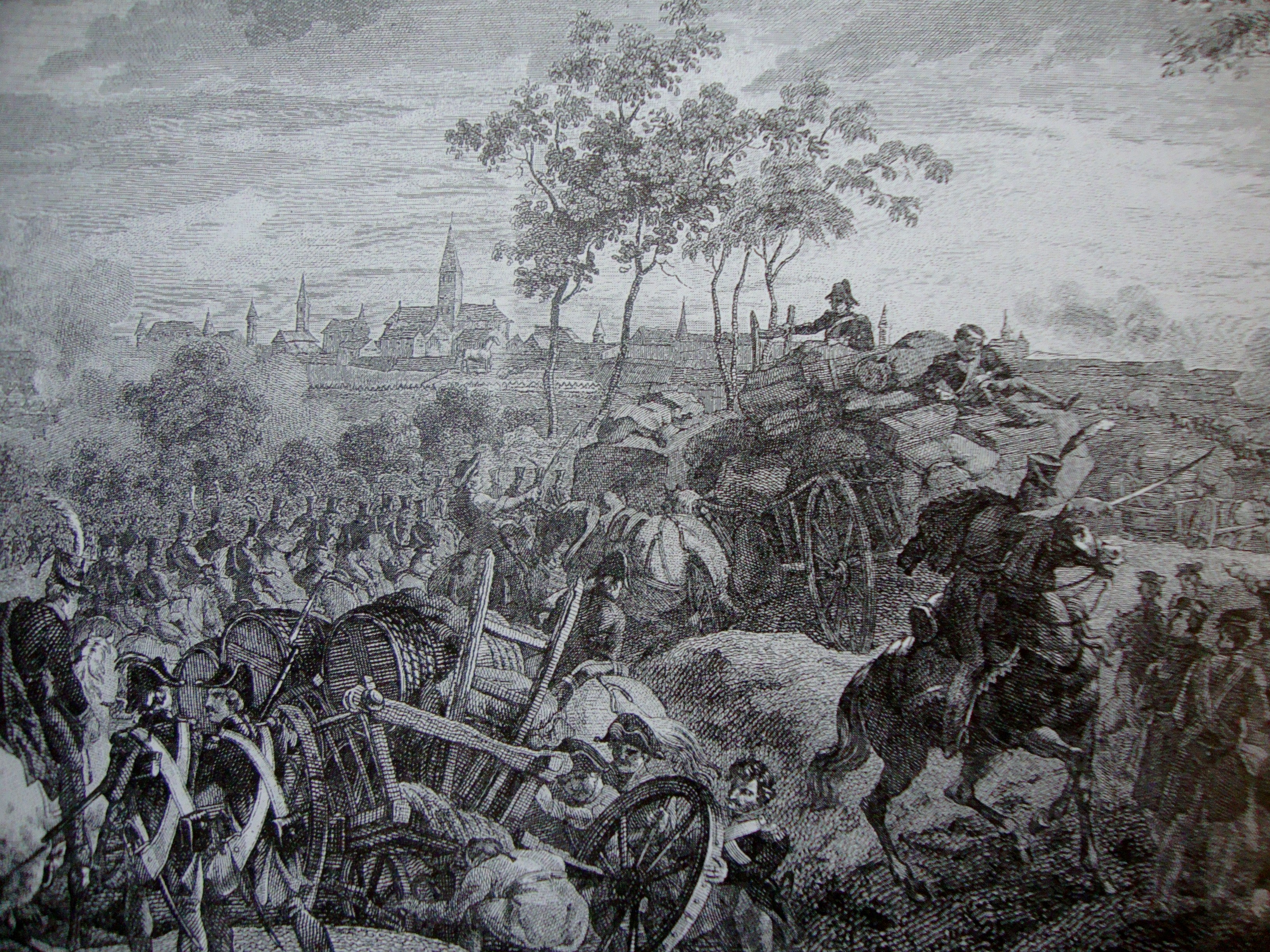
- Print of the 1792 siege of Thionville
Date	24 August – 16 October 1792
Location	Thionville, France 49.3589°N 6.1692°E
Result	French revolutionary victory

Belligerents
Kingdom of the French (until 21 September); French First Republic	(Habsburg monarchy) Habsburg Realm; Armée des Émigrés

Commanders and leaders
(France) Georges Félix de Wimpffen	(Habsburg monarchy) Friedrich Wilhelm, Fürst zu Hohenlohe-Kirchberg

Strength
3,000–5,000 French	20,000 Austrians; 12,000–16,000 French émigrés

Casualties and losses
Low	Very heavy
- Location within Europe

The siege of Thionville saw an unsuccessful attempt to conquer the French stronghold of Thionville by the Austro-royalists during the War of the First Coalition.

== Siege ==
It began at Thionville on 24 August 1792. A coalition force of 20,000 Austrians and 16,000 French Royalist troops under Friedrich Wilhelm, Fürst zu Hohenlohe-Kirchberg failed to take the town, commanded by Georges Félix de Wimpffen, and raised the siege on 16 October. One of the French royalist troops was François-René de Chateaubriand, who was wounded in the battle.

== Aftermath ==
In the aftermath of the siege the National Convention declared that Thionville had "deserved well of the fatherland" - it named Place de Thionville and Rue de Thionville in Paris after the victory.

== Legacy ==
Louis-Emmanuel Nadine created the lyrical drama Siége de Thionville in 1793.

== Notes ==
Preceded by Battle of Verdun (1792)	French Revolution: Revolutionary campaigns Siege of Thionville (1792)	Succeeded by Battle of Valmy
