= Château de Brécourt =

Château in Eure, Normandy, France

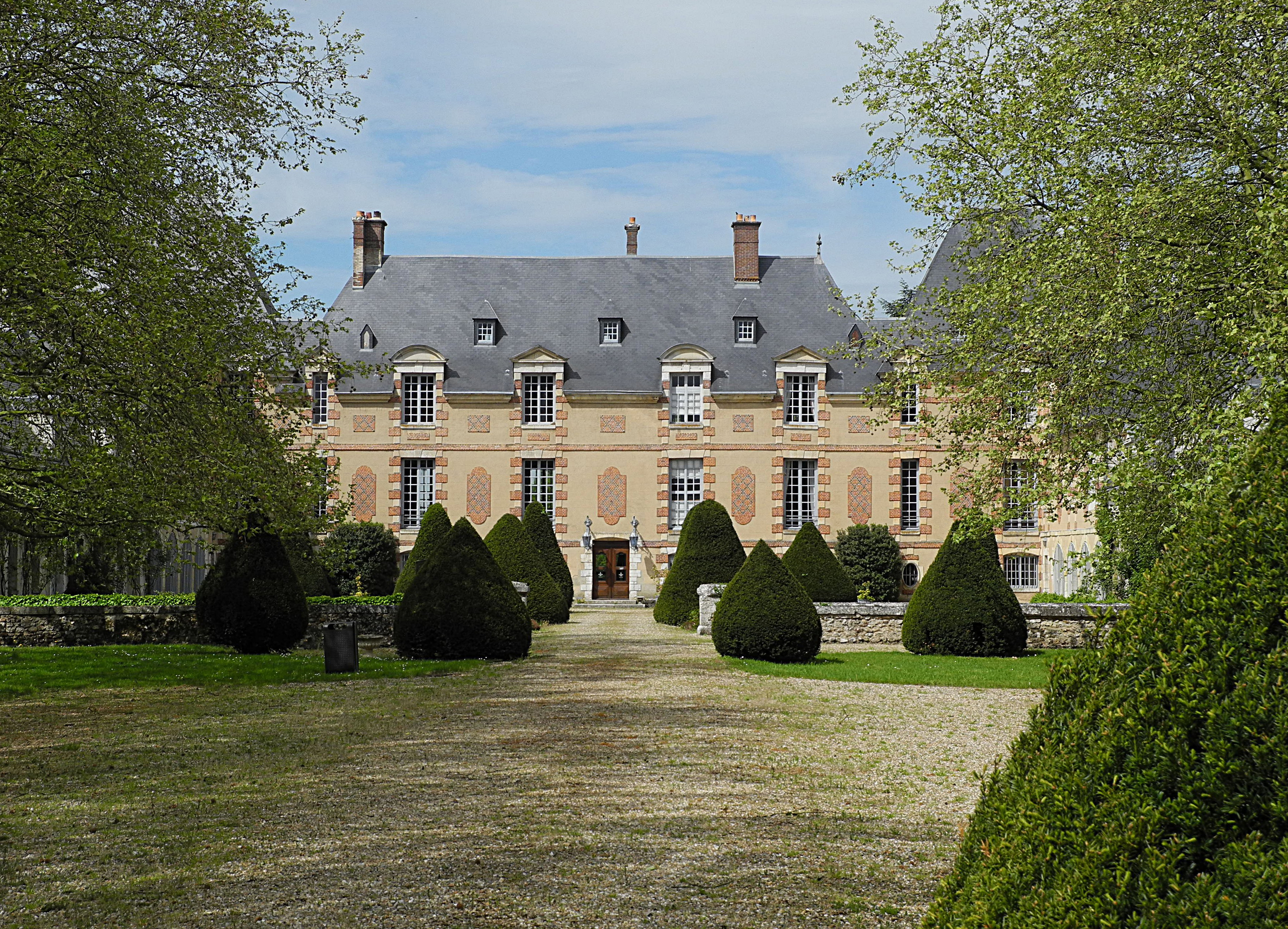
- The front elevation

- Location within France
- 49°03′06″N 1°25′25″E
- Location: Douains, Eure, France

Site notes
- Owner: Private owner

Monument historique
- Designated: 1967

The Château de Brécourt is a 17th-century château surrounded by a moat, located in a large forest park, between Vernon and Douains (formerly Brécourt) in the Eure department, 70 km west of Paris.

== Description ==
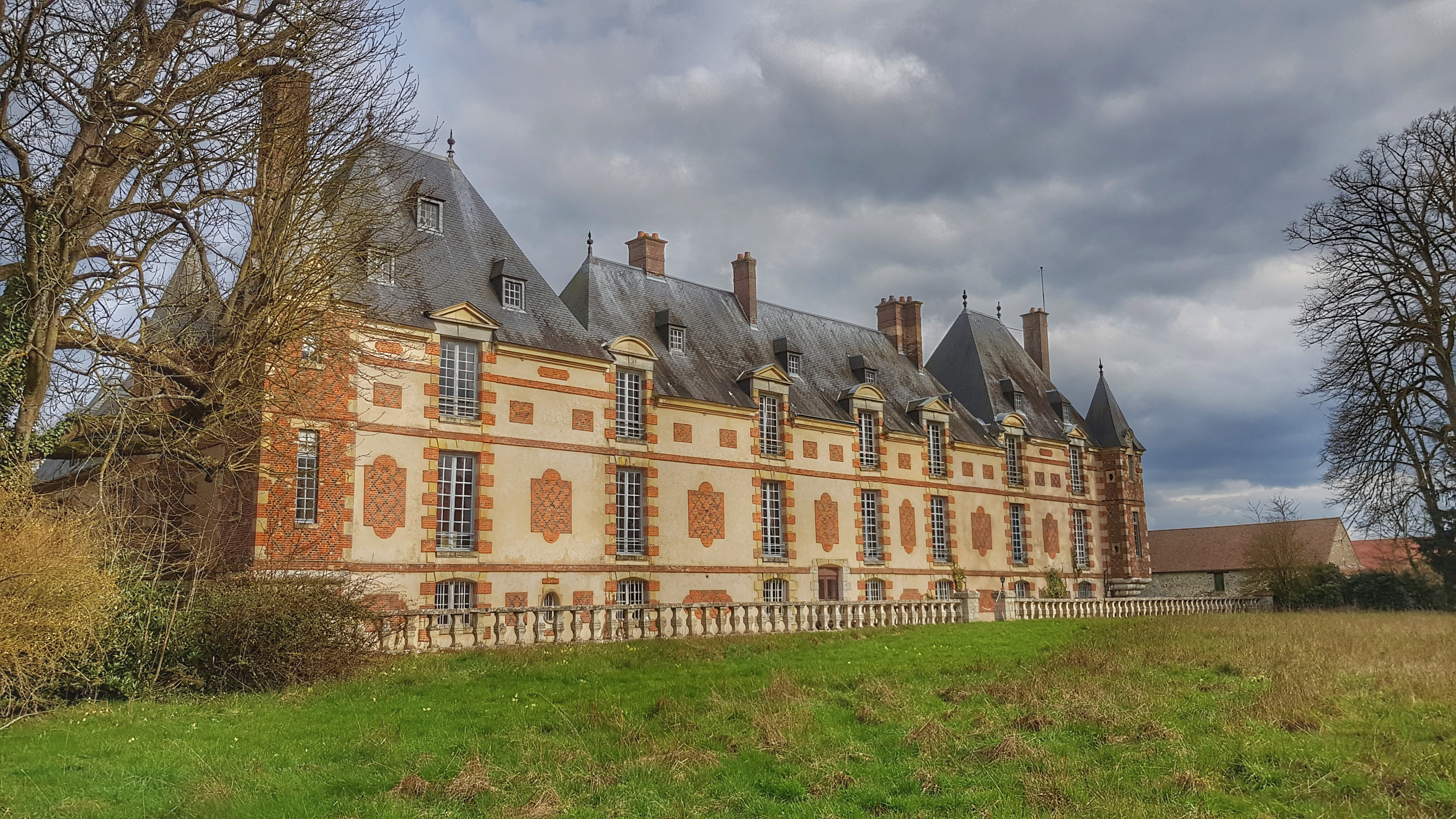
The rear elevation

The present château was built on the site of an older castle in 1625 in stone and brick, for a member of the local noble family Jubert de Bouville. In this case, the sponsor was Jean Jubert in 1635.

After a few years, the château was transformed into a luxury palace.

== History ==
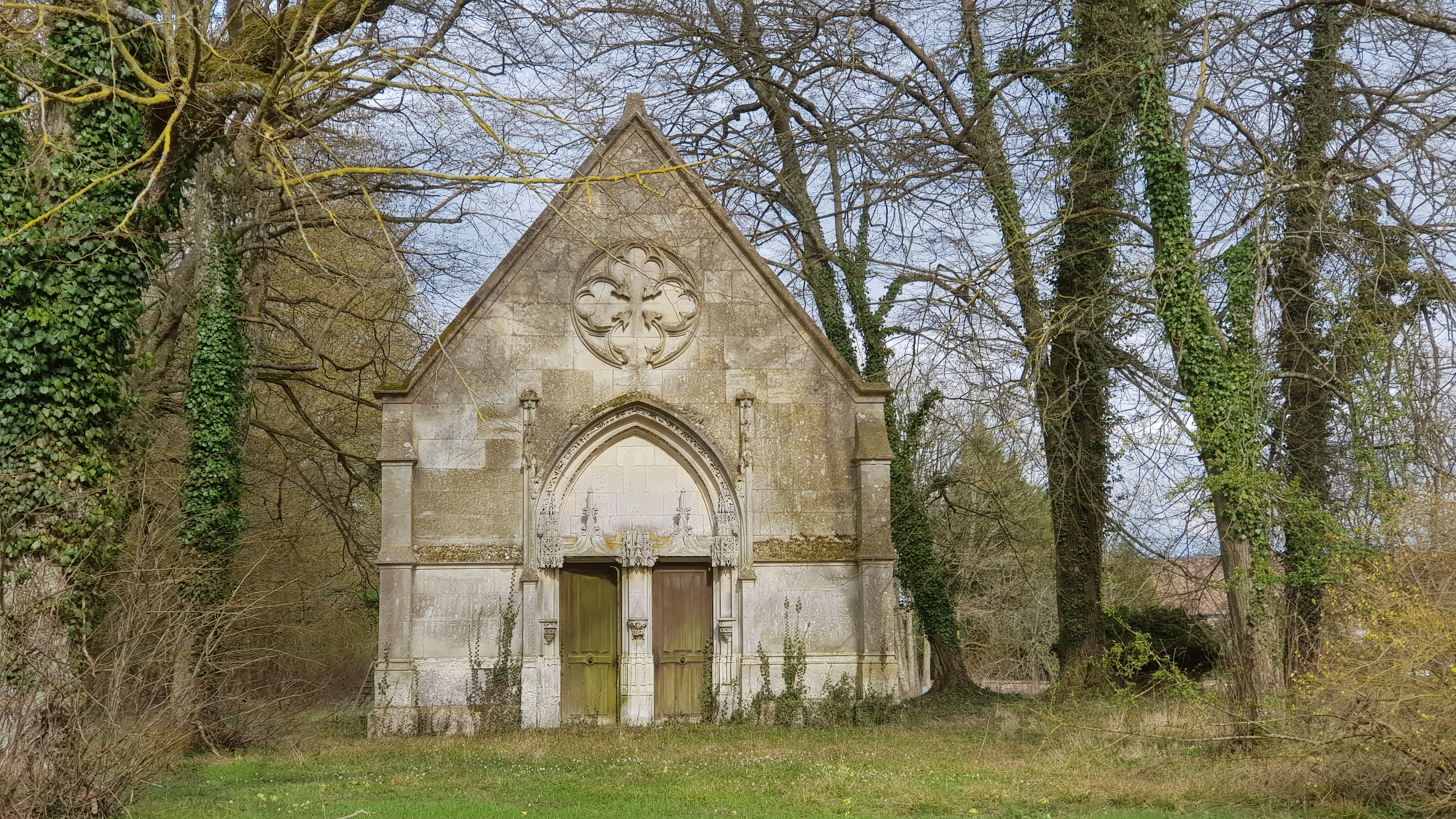
The remains of the chapel

The 14th-century bishop Robert de Brécourt took the name of the castle in which he was born. He was the bishop of Évreux between 1340 and 1374.

On July 14, 1793, the Battle of Brécourt took place here between the Federalists of the West and the forces of the Convention.

In 1802 the château became the property of Catherine-Dominique de Pérignon.

It was acquired in 1930 by the American chargé d'affaires in Paris, Norman Armour, then in 1939 by Mrs. Strauss-Von-Haban, née De Gunzbourg.

After being a luxurious hotel for 30 years, the château has been abandoned for 9 years, then sold to a new company which planned its restoration and reopening. But the new owner has to face a new challenge, the château had been closed in 2009 by the préfecture for safety reason (accessibility for disabled people, electricity, fire alarm, etc.). Despite a crowdfunding in 2018, the château is for sale again in 2021.

== Protection ==
The façades and roofs of the château and the outbuildings, the forecourt (including the access bridge and its moat) and the main courtyard were included in the inventory of historic monuments by order of June 28, 1967.

== Sources ==
- Histoire et géographie du département de l'Eure, Rateau and Pinet 1870, new edition 1988
