= Chaufour-lès-Bonnières =

- Commune
- Coat of arms
- Location of Chaufour-lès-Bonnières
- Location within France Location within Île-de-France (region)
- Coordinates: 49°01′01″N 1°29′03″E
- Country: France
- Region: Île-de-France
- Department: Yvelines
- Arrondissement: Mantes-la-Jolie
- Canton: Bonnières-sur-Seine

Government
  - Mayor (2020–2026): Patrice Preaux
- Area^{1}: 3.02 km^{2} (1.17 sq mi)
- Highest elevation: 158 m (518 ft)
- Lowest elevation: 133 m (436 ft)
- Population (2023): 442
  - Density: 146/km^{2} (379/sq mi)
- Time zone: UTC+01:00 (CET)
  - Summer (DST): UTC+02:00 (CEST)
- INSEE/Postal code: 78147 /78270
- ^{1} French Land Register data, which excludes lakes, ponds, glaciers > 1 km^{2} (0.386 sq mi or 247 acres) and river estuaries.

Chaufour-lès-Bonnières (French pronunciation: [ʃofuʁ lɛ bɔnjɛʁ], literally Chaufour near Bonnières) is a commune in the Yvelines department in the Île-de-France region in north-central France.

== See also ==
- Communes of the Yvelines department
