= La Villeneuve-en-Chevrie =

- Commune
- Location of La Villeneuve-en-Chevrie
- Location within France Location within Île-de-France (region)
- Coordinates: 49°00′56″N 1°31′39″E
- Country: France
- Region: Île-de-France
- Department: Yvelines
- Arrondissement: Mantes-la-Jolie
- Canton: Bonnières-sur-Seine

Government
  - Mayor (2020–2026): Alain Pezzali
- Area^{1}: 11.79 km^{2} (4.55 sq mi)
- Elevation: 108 m (354 ft)
- Highest elevation: 151 m (495 ft)
- Lowest elevation: 25 m (82 ft)
- Population (2023): 665
  - Density: 56.4/km^{2} (146/sq mi)
- Time zone: UTC+01:00 (CET)
  - Summer (DST): UTC+02:00 (CEST)
- INSEE/Postal code: 78668 /78270
- ^{1} French Land Register data, which excludes lakes, ponds, glaciers > 1 km^{2} (0.386 sq mi or 247 acres) and river estuaries.

La Villeneuve-en-Chevrie (French pronunciation: [la vilnœv ɑ̃ ʃəvʁi]) is a commune in the Yvelines department in the Île-de-France region in north-central France.

== See also ==
- Communes of the Yvelines department
