= Chaussy, Val-d'Oise =

Chaussy
- Commune
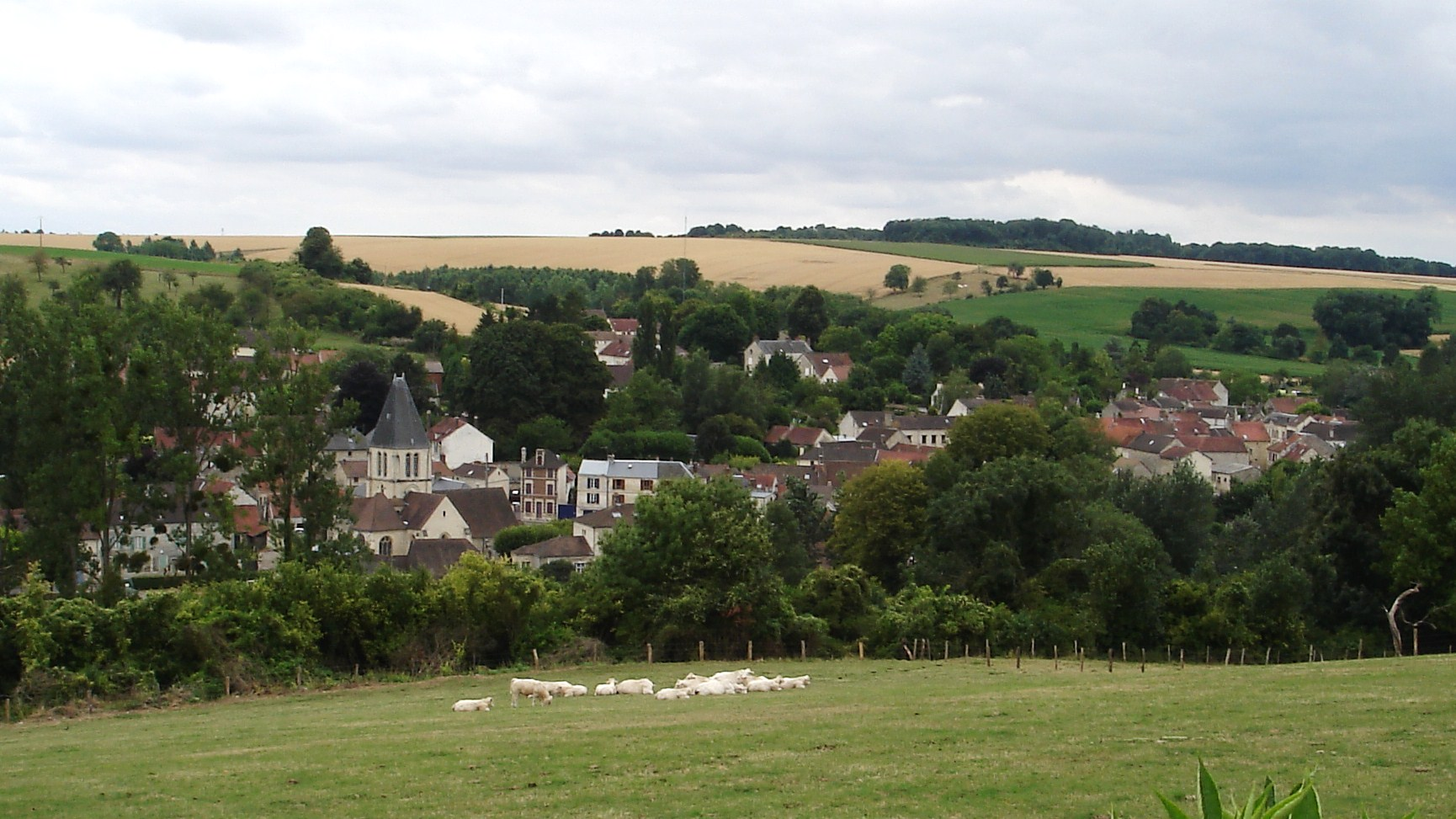
- A general view of Chaussy
- Location of Chaussy
- Location within France Location within Île-de-France (region)
- Coordinates: 49°07′21″N 1°41′33″E
- Country: France
- Region: Île-de-France
- Department: Val-d'Oise
- Arrondissement: Pontoise
- Canton: Vauréal
- Intercommunality: Vexin Val de Seine

Government
  - Mayor (2020–2026): Philippe Lemoine
- Area^{1}: 14.56 km^{2} (5.62 sq mi)
- Highest elevation: 202 m (663 ft)
- Lowest elevation: 45 m (148 ft)
- Population (2023): 631
  - Density: 43.3/km^{2} (112/sq mi)
- Time zone: UTC+01:00 (CET)
  - Summer (DST): UTC+02:00 (CEST)
- INSEE/Postal code: 95150 /95710
- ^{1} French Land Register data, which excludes lakes, ponds, glaciers > 1 km^{2} (0.386 sq mi or 247 acres) and river estuaries.

Chaussy (French pronunciation: [ʃosi]) is a commune in the Val-d'Oise department in Île-de-France in northern France. It is located in the regional nature park of Vexin.

== Geography ==
Chaussy is located approximately 55 km from the center of Paris.

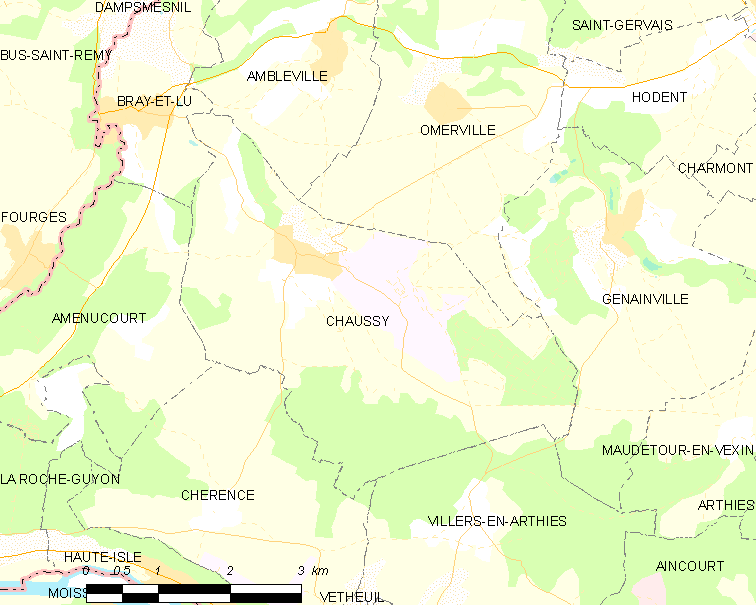
A map of the commune

== Gallery ==
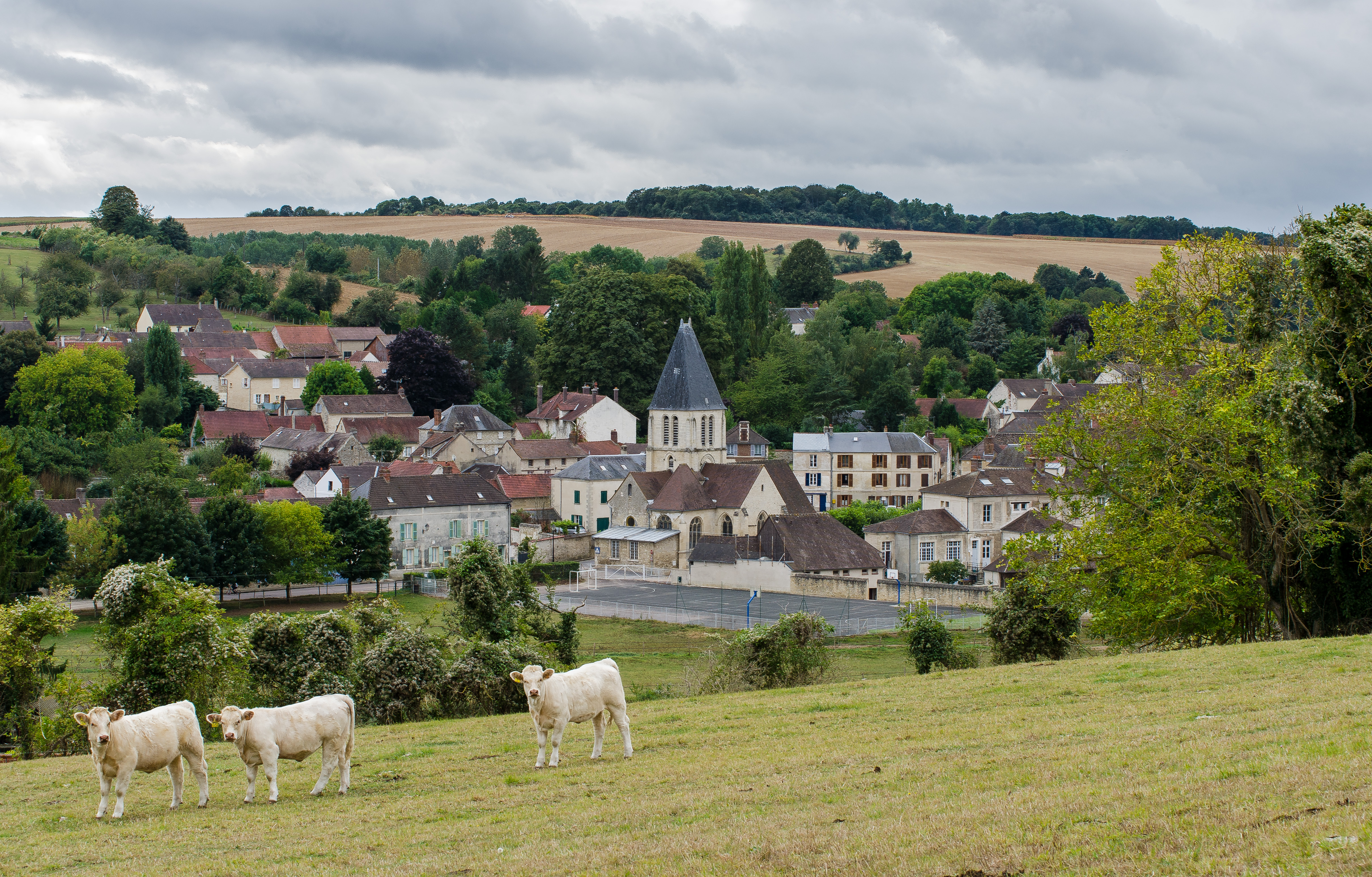
A view of Chaussy

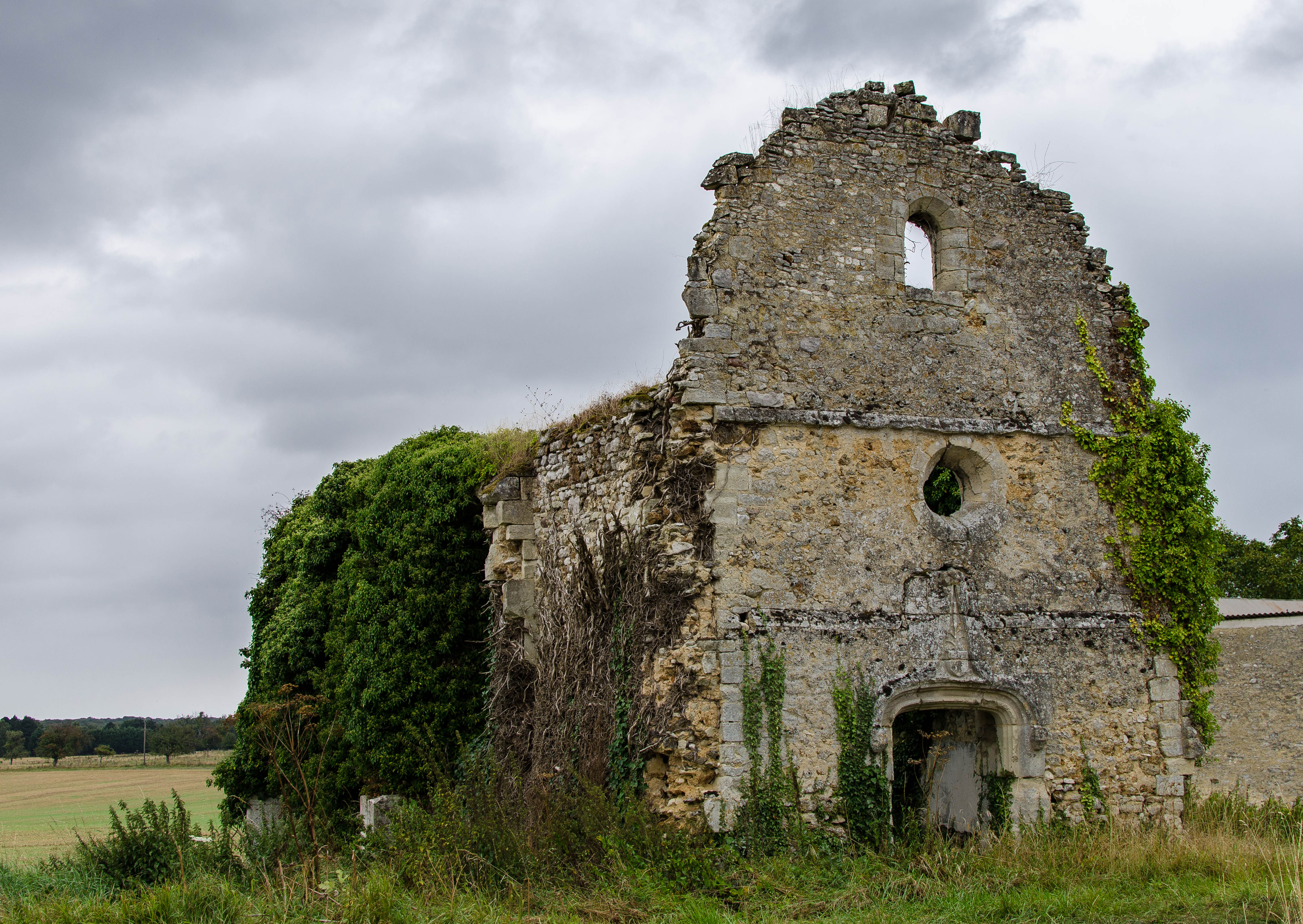
The ruins of Chapelle Saint-Laurent de Méré

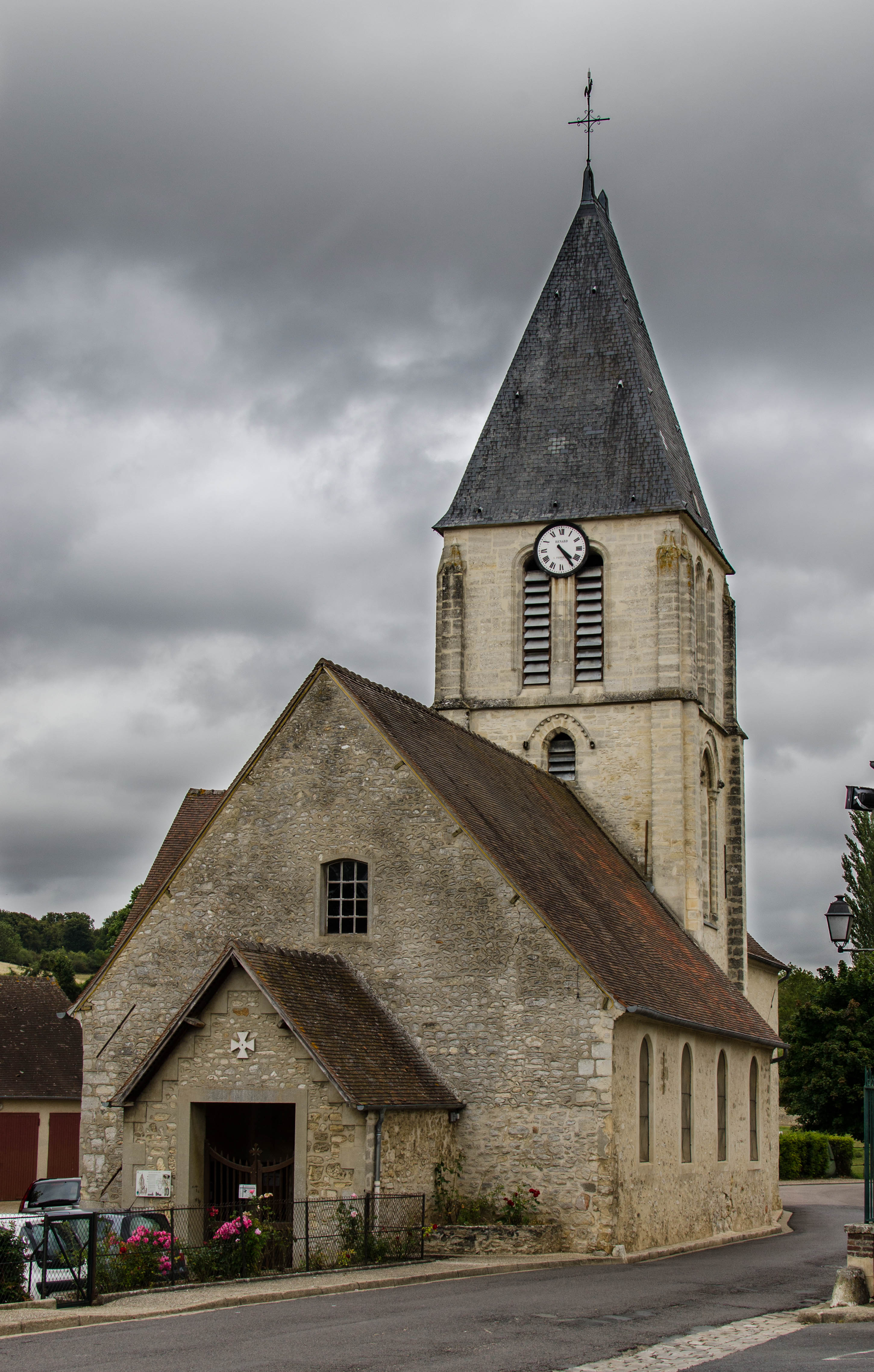
The church of Chaussy

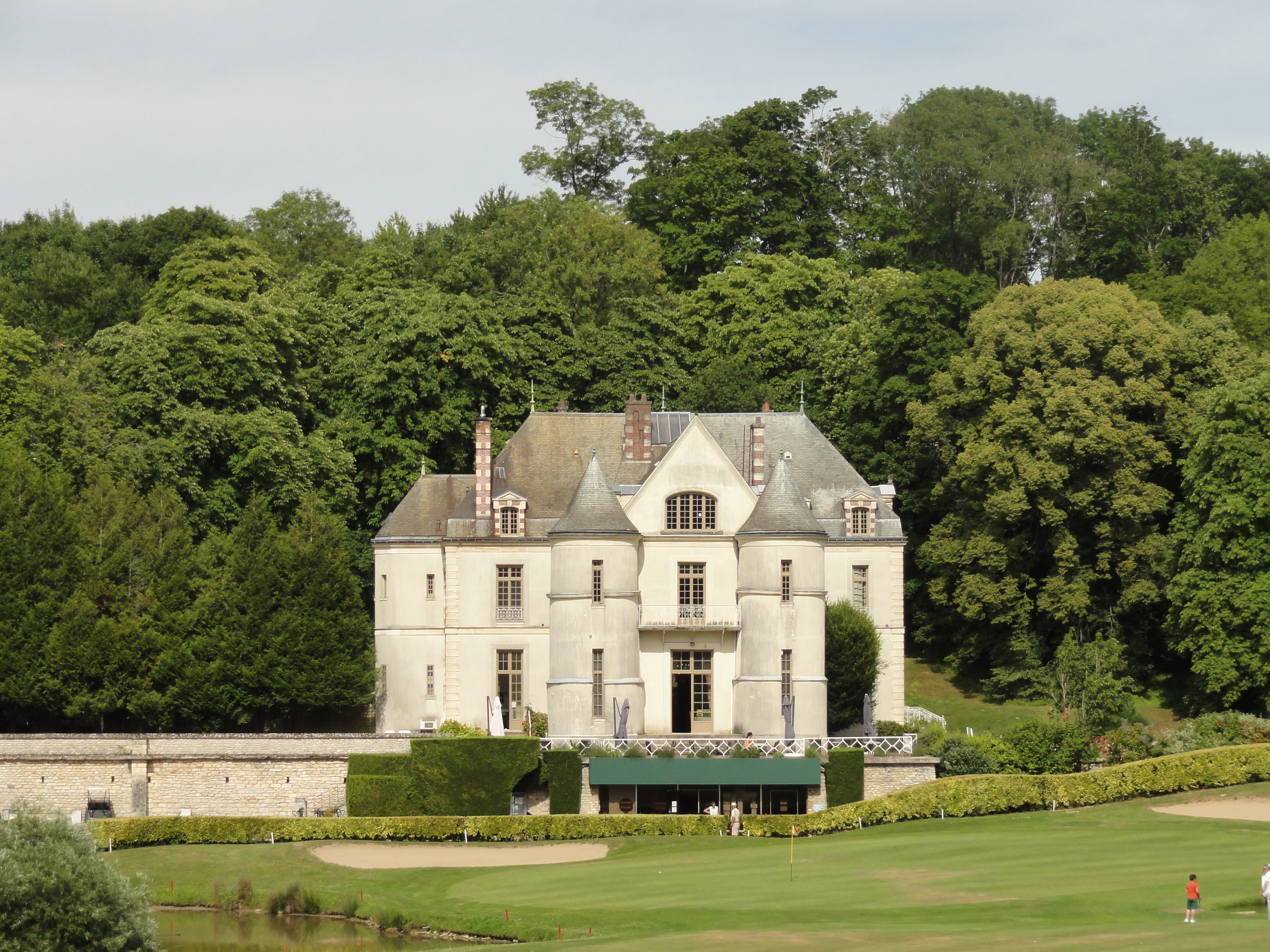
The château du Prieuré

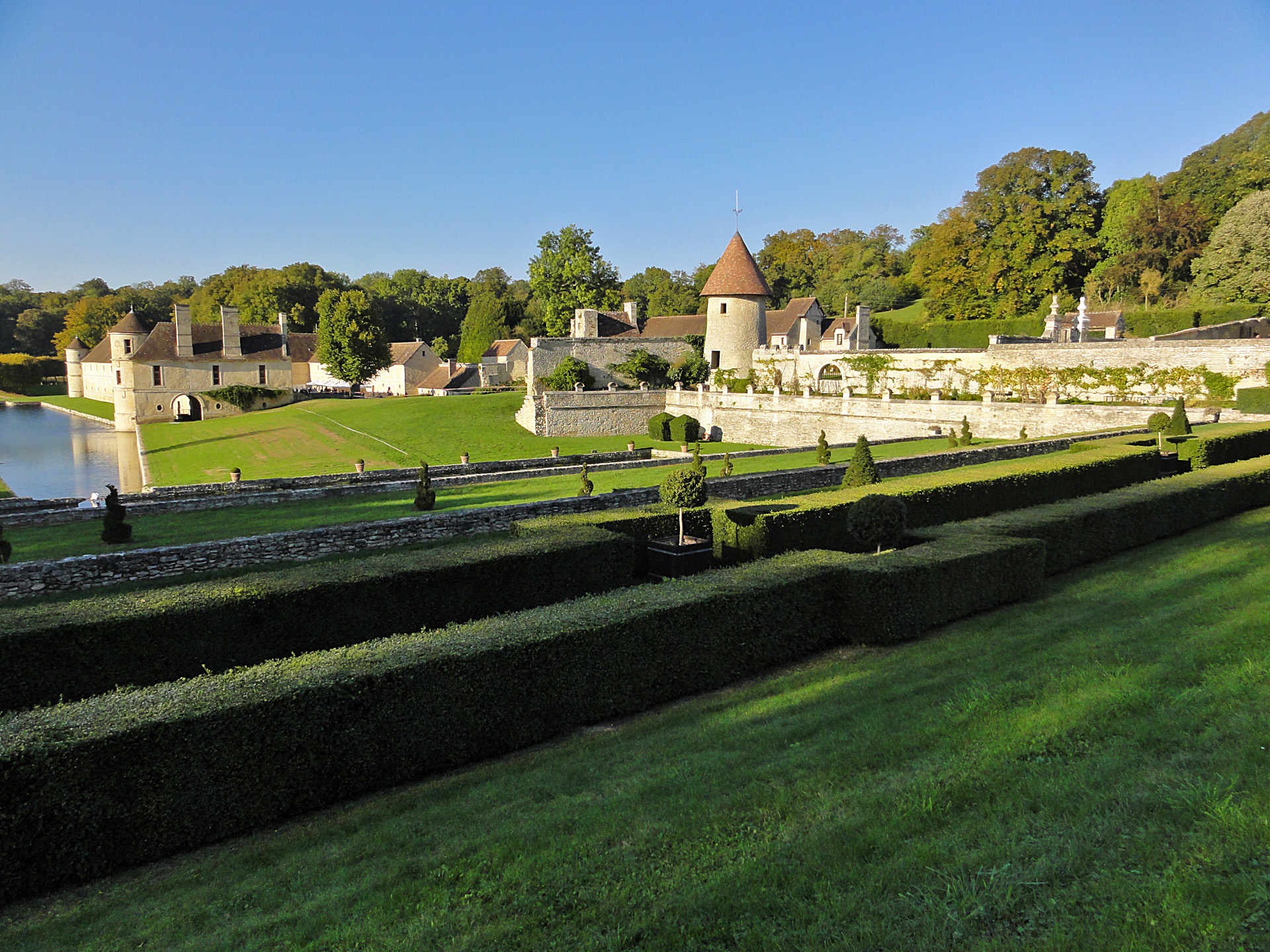
The Domaine of Villarceaux

== See also ==
- Communes of the Val-d'Oise department
