= Douains =

- Commune
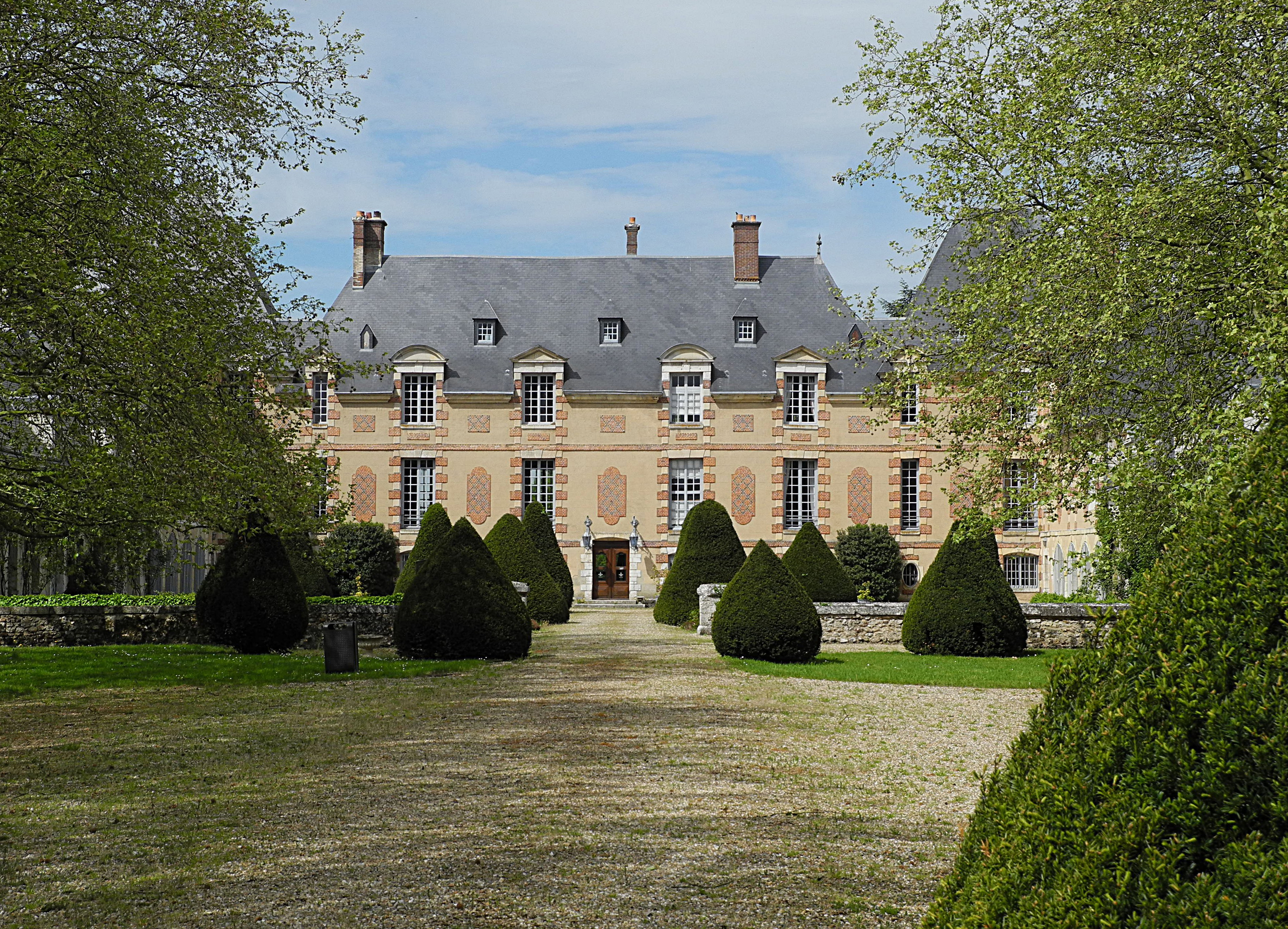
- Château de Brécourt

- Coat of arms
- Location of Douains
- Location within France Location within Normandy
- Coordinates: 49°02′27″N 1°25′47″E
- Country: France
- Region: Normandy
- Department: Eure
- Arrondissement: Les Andelys
- Canton: Pacy-sur-Eure
- Intercommunality: Seine Normandie Agglomération

Government
  - Mayor (2020–2026): Vincent Leroy
- Area^{1}: 11.27 km^{2} (4.35 sq mi)
- Elevation: 134 m (440 ft)
- Highest elevation: 148 m (486 ft)
- Lowest elevation: 97 m (318 ft)
- Population (2023): 450
  - Density: 40/km^{2} (100/sq mi)
- Time zone: UTC+01:00 (CET)
  - Summer (DST): UTC+02:00 (CEST)
- INSEE/Postal code: 27203 /27120
- ^{1} French Land Register data, which excludes lakes, ponds, glaciers > 1 km^{2} (0.386 sq mi or 247 acres) and river estuaries.

Douains (French pronunciation: [dwɛ̃]) is a commune in the Eure department in Normandy in northern France, six kilometres from Vernon.

Douains is the home of the animal cemetery Les Jardins du Souvenir, which was founded in 1999 with about 400 tombs.

== Population ==
Historical population
Year	Pop.	±% p.a.
1968	261	—
1975	233	−1.61%
1982	298	+3.58%
1990	346	+1.88%
1999	465	+3.34%
2007	468	+0.08%
2012	459	−0.39%
2017	513	+2.25%
2023	450	−2.16%
Source: INSEE

== See also ==
- Communes of the Eure department
