= Jean Bonaventure Birotteau =

French lawyer and politician

Jean Bonaventure Blaise Hilarion Birotteau (sometimes called Jean-Baptiste Biroteau; 21 October 1758 - 24 October 1793) was a French lawyer and politician, elected as a deputy to the National Assembly in 1792 from the department of the Pyrénées-Orientales, and affiliated with the Girondins. In 1793, he was arrested and guillotined.

== Biography ==
Birotteau was born in Perpignan, in the Province of Roussillon, where he practiced law. After 1789, he served as municipal councilman and later district secretary in Perpignan. Elected on 3 September as deputy to National Convention. He opposed the military forces raised by the Comune of Paris. In 1793, while voting to convict Louis XVI, he also voted to suspend the sentence.

Engaged in the increasingly vitriolic arguments between the Girondists and the Montagnards, on 1 April 1793, he accused Fabre d'Églantine, an ally of Georges Danton, of proposing to restore the monarchy. He also accused Robespierre of hypocrisy. However, the victory by the Mountagnards, and their development of the Terror, led to his arrest on 31 May 1793. He evaded the house arrest, by fleeing through a window, and making his way to Lyon. There he lobbied for rebellion to the National Government. On 28 July 1793, he was convicted in absentia as a traitor to the state. When the National army besieged Lyon, he fled to Bordeaux. Captured, he was guillotined on 24 October 1793. On 17 December 1794, the national convention voted a subsidy for his widow.
