= Georges Félix de Wimpffen =

French general (1744–1814)

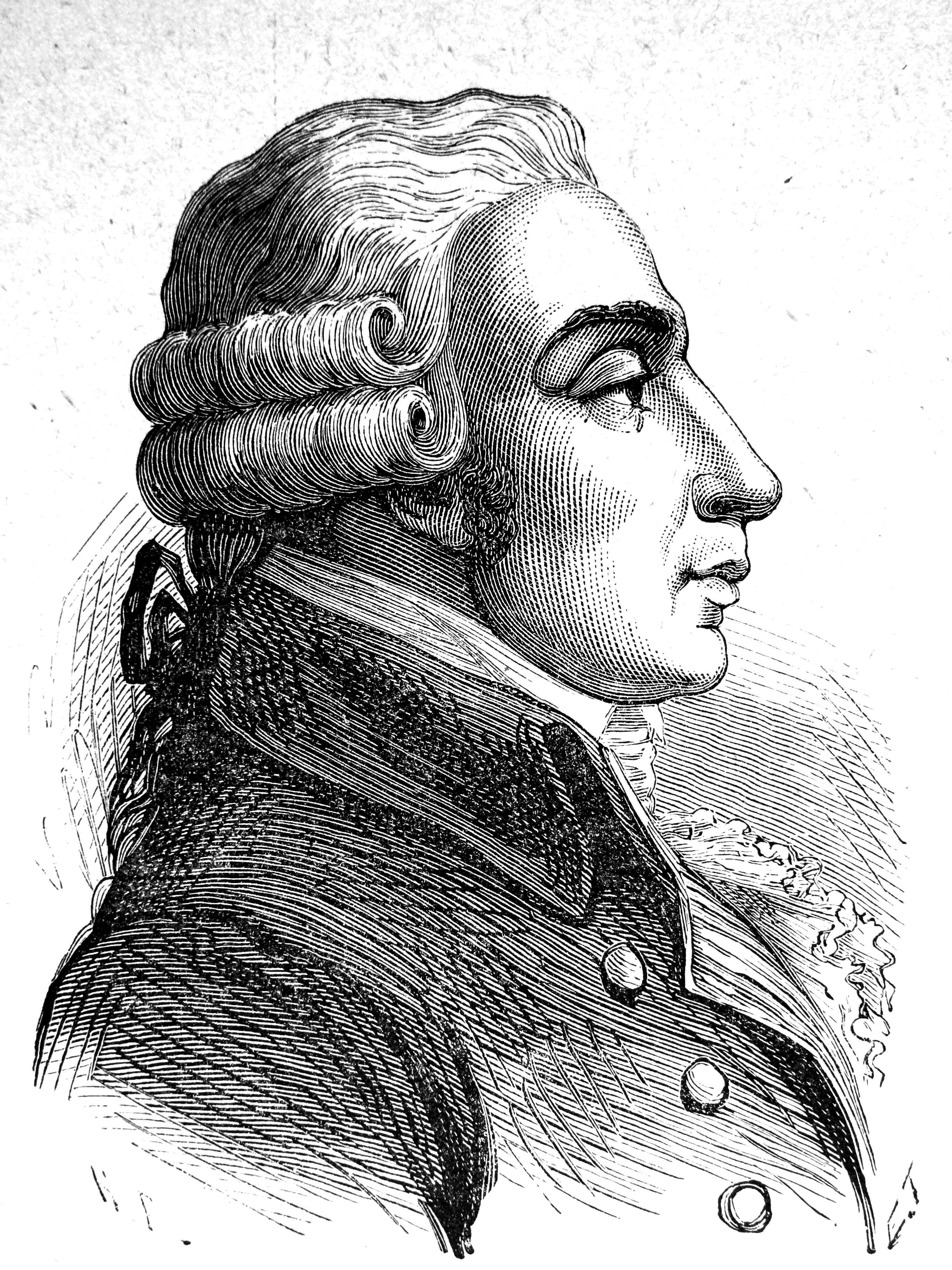
Georges Félix de Wimpffen

Georges-Louis-Félix, baron de Wimpffen or Wimpfen (5 November 1744 – 23 February 1814) was a French general of the Revolutionary and Napoleonic Wars.

== Life ==
=== Ancien Régime ===
Most sources show he was born at Deux-Points (now Zweibrücken in Germany), though Laurent Ridel argues he was born in the parish of Minfeld His father was Jean Georges de Wimpffen, chamberlain to king Stanislas. For eleven years he was in the service of the duke of Deux-Ponts. An ensign in the régiment Royal-Deux-Ponts, he became a captain in the régiment de la Marck. In 1768 he took part in the Corsican campaign, returning from it a lieutenant-colonel.

In 1778, whilst stationed near Bayeux, he attended the nobility's salons and there met Marie-Aimée Charlotte de Bailleul, heiress to the lordship of Saint-Germain-de-la-Lieue, who he married. He commanded a regiment during the American Revolutionary War and assisted in the sieges of Mahon and Gibraltar (1781–1782). His fine defence of the French lines at Gibraltar gained him a pension of 1000 écus and the rank of maréchal de camp on 9 March 1788. When the war ended he retired to his estates in Normandy. He wrote the Manuel de Xépholius (Paris, 1788, in-8°), published anonymously in an edition of only 100 copies, and later Mémoires pour l’histoire de la révolution.

=== Revolution to Empire ===
He was elected deputy for the nobility for the 'bailliage' of Caen in the Estates General of 1789, he joined the Third Estate, adopted the new revolutionary principles as a moderate, joined the committees for pensions and the military and became a freemason in the Themis lodge back in Caen. He joined the army at the opening of hostilities and was promoted to lieutenant general on 20 August 1792, commanding Thionville, the first town to which the Allies under the Prince of Hohenlohe laid siege. It began on 24 August 1792 and he held out for a month, refusing a bribe of one million from the Duke of Brunswick, replying "I'll accept the million if he'll agree to a document for that donation witnessed before a notary". Three days later the siege was lifted by the French victory at the battle of Valmy. The National Convention declared he had deserved well of the fatherland, a declaration which protected him against later denunciations.

He was offered the post of Minister of War but declined it and was instead put in command of the Army of the Coasts of Cherbourg. Following the moves by the Girondins on 31 May, he offered them his sword in June 1793 and was put in command of the troops they were gathering in the department of Calvados, although he made no secret that he was more favourable to a constitutional monarchy than a republic. Several Girondin deputies met in Caen and five departments in Brittany and three in Normandy formed a coalition. The Convention sent Prieur de la Côte-d’Or and Charles-Gilbert Romme into Calvados, but Wimpffen arrested them and imprisoned them in Caen Castle.

Accused, he replied by a proclamation including the phrase "The liars say to you 'Félix Wimpffen marches against Paris'; don't believe it; I march towards Paris, for Paris, and for the safety of the one and indivisible Republic". Even so, the inhabitants of Calvados cooled little by little towards the Girondins out of fear of the royalists. Wimpffen had very few volunteers among his eight battalions and was forced to withdraw 500-600 men from Brittany, sending them under the royalist Joseph de Puisaye to meet the convention's troops. This advance guard scattered at Pacy-sur-Eure without even fighting at the Battle of Vernon on 13 July.

Wimpffen then tried to fortify Caen and to print bank notes there. During an interview there with the Girondins, according to Jean-Baptiste Louvet de Couvray he suggested negotiating with Great Britain so as to be sure of quickly getting men and weapons. The Girondins vehemently opposed such a suggestion and Wimpffen instead rallied at Lisieux what was left of the rebel bands. This failure was almost fatal - the Convention put a price on his head and he abandoned his troops, returning briefly to Caen, where he realised further fighting was impossibly. He then secretly went to Bayeux, where he managed to avoid those hunting for him. Almost forgotten until 18 Brumaire, he was reinstated in the army as a general of division. He served as Inspector-General of the Imperial Stables from 24 July 1806 onwards. He was made a Baron of the Empire in 1808 and died in retirement in Bayeux six years later.
