= List of châteaux in Normandy =

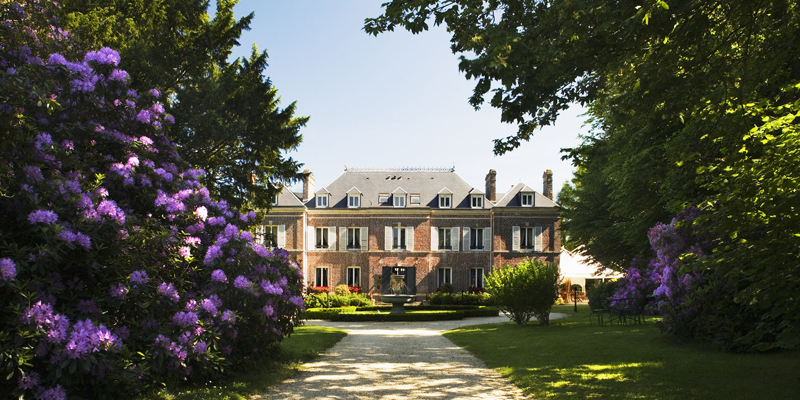
Château les Bruyères

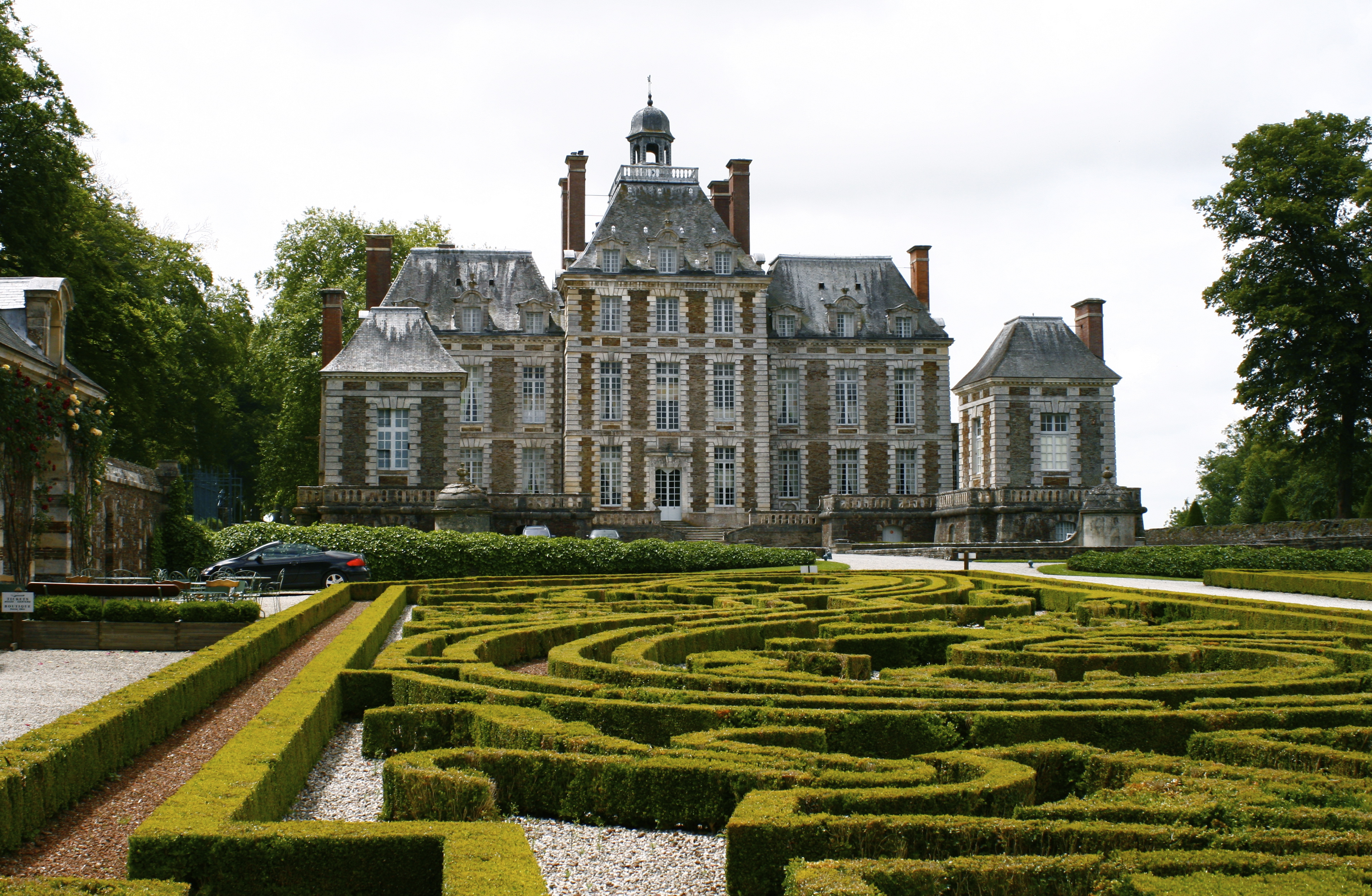
Balleroy Castle

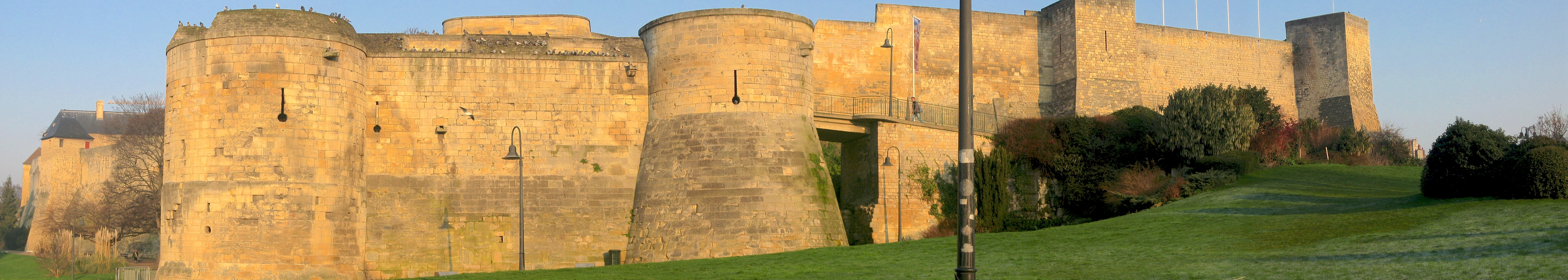
Château de Caen

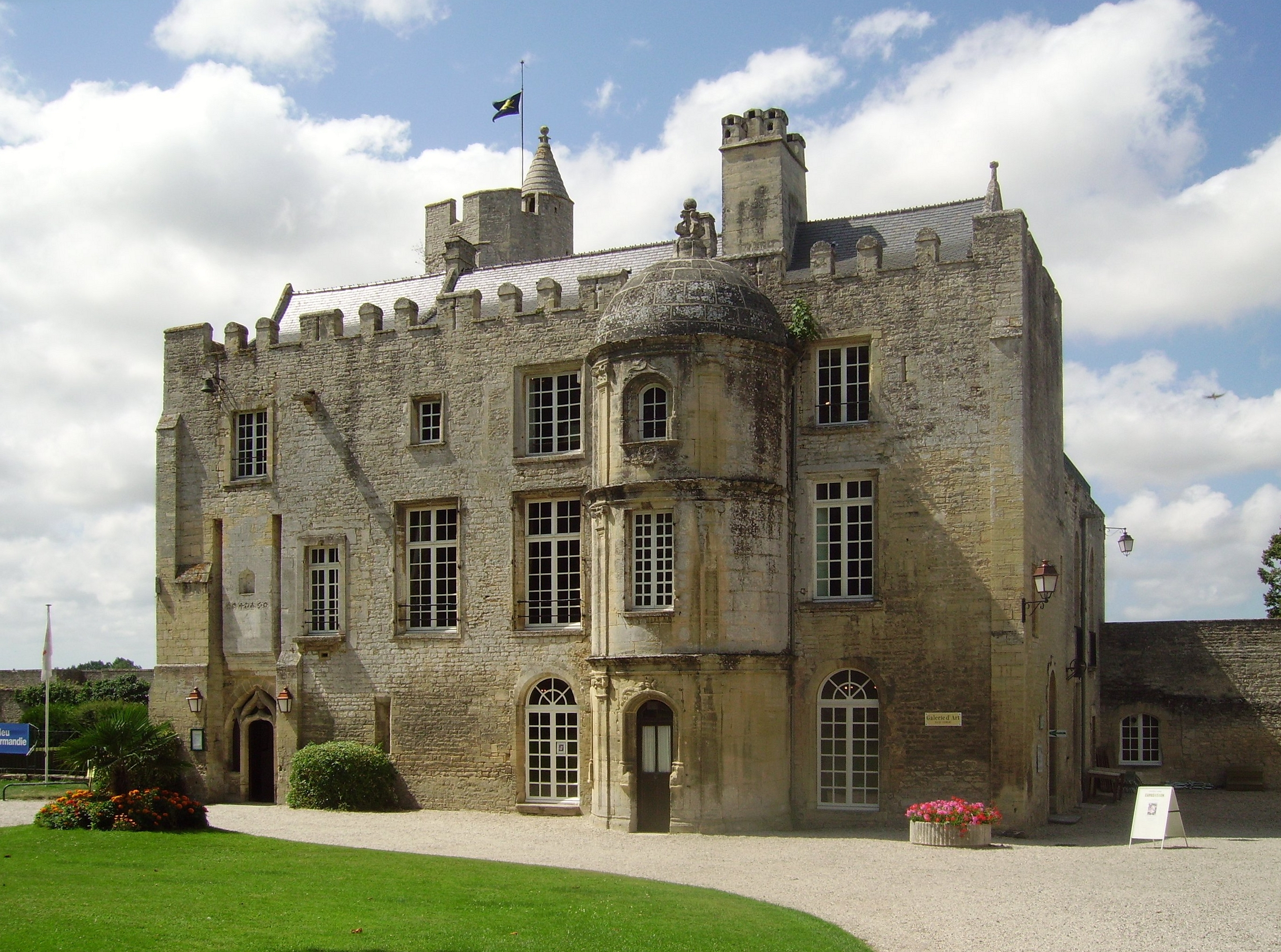
Château de Creully

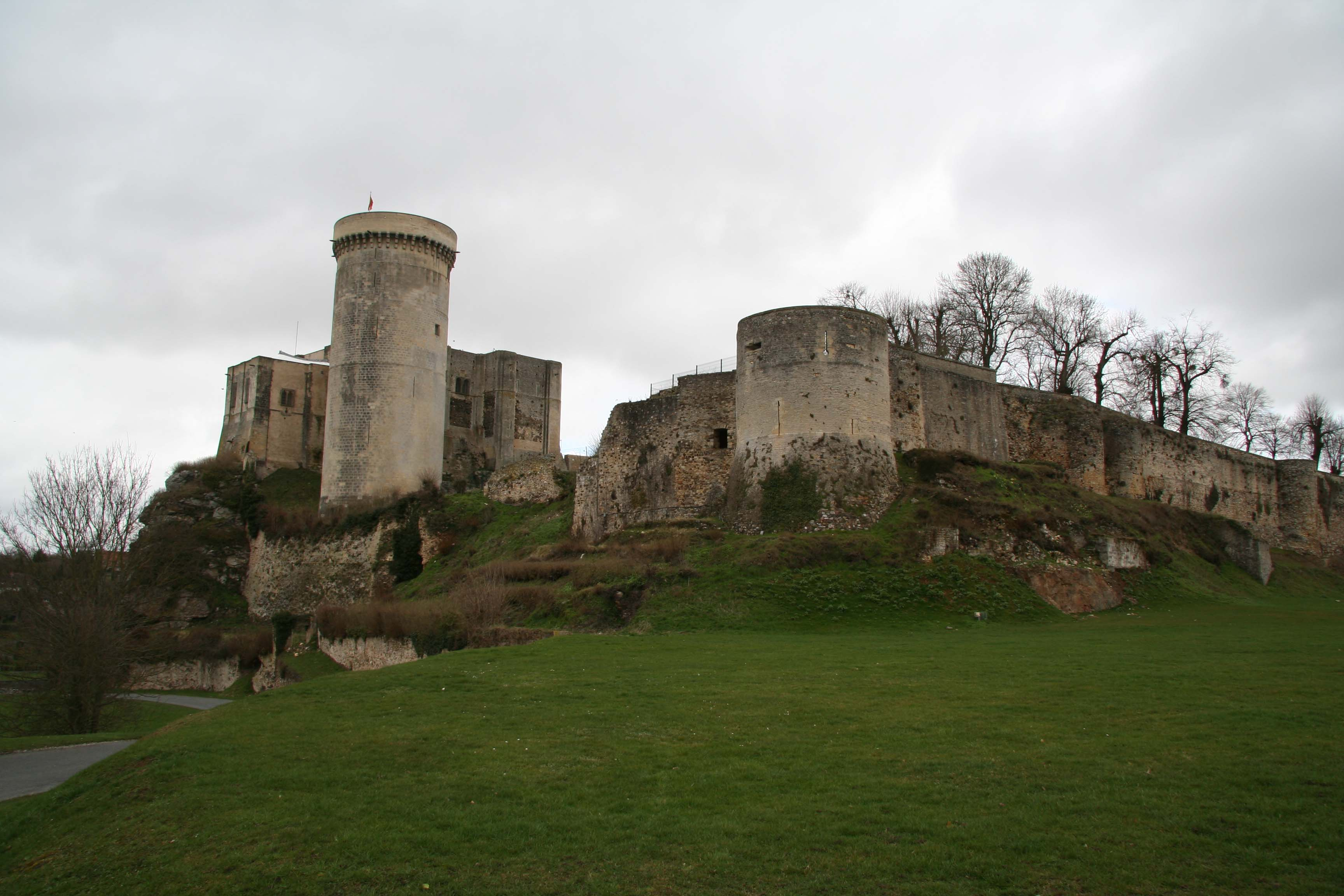
Château de Falaise

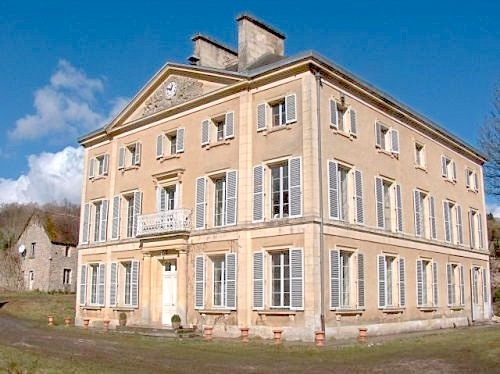
Château de La Pommeraye in Calvados.

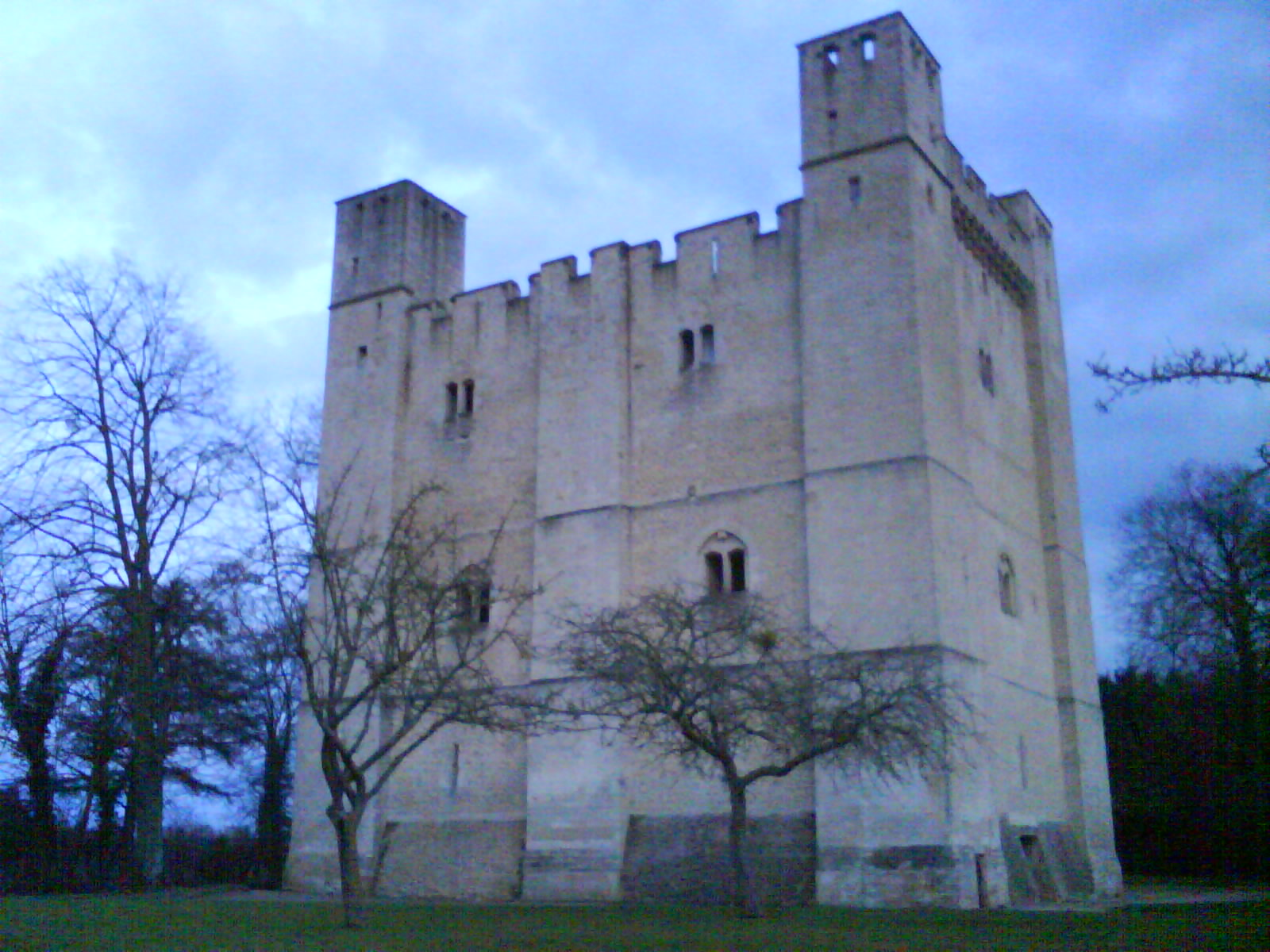
Donjon de Chambois

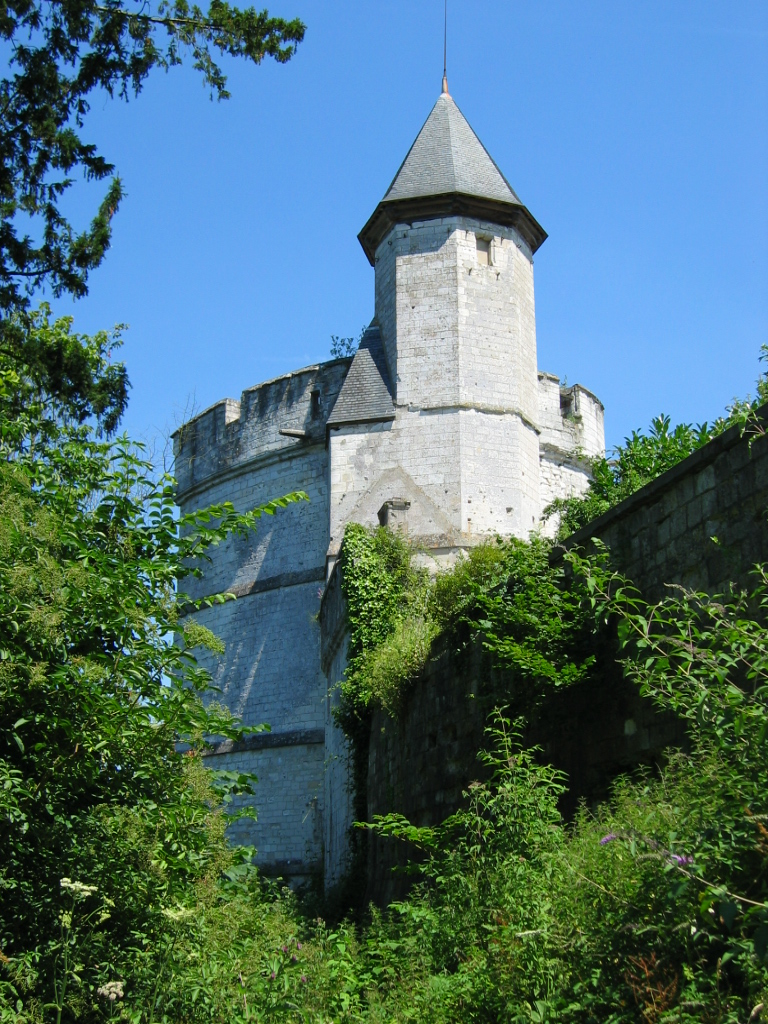
Château de Tancarville, near the Manoir du Clap

This is a list of châteaux in the French region of Normandy.

== Lower Normandy ==
=== Calvados ===
- Chateau de Juaye in Bayeaux
- Château d'Ailly in Bernières-d'Ailly
- Balleroy Castle in Balleroy
- Château de Beaumont-le-Richard in Englesqueville-la-Percée private
- Château de Bénouville in Bénouville
- Château de Brécy in Saint-Gabriel-Brécy
- Château du Breuil, in Breuil-en-Auge
- Château les Bruyères in Cambremer
- Château de Caen in Caen
- Château de Canon in Mézidon-Canon
- Château de Colombières in Colombières private, open to visitors
- Château de Courcy in Courcy private
- Château de Creully in Creully
- Château de Falaise in Falaise
- Château de Fontaine-Henry in Fontaine-Henry
- Château de Guernon-Ranville in Ranville
- Château de Lion-sur-Mer in Lion-sur-Mer
- Château d'Olivet in Grimbosq
- Château de La Pommeraye in La Pommeraye
- Château du Neubourg in Saint-Marcouf, Calvados
- Château de Pontécoulant in Pontécoulant
- Château de Saint-Germain-de-Livet in Saint-Germain-de-Livet
- Château de Tournebu in Tournebu
- Château de Vendeuvre in Vendeuvre
- Château de Versainville in Versainville
- Château de Vire in Vire

=== Manche ===
- Château d'Amfreville in Amfreville, private
- La Bastille in Beuzeville-la-Bastille, ruined
- Hôtel de Beaumont (town residence) in Valognes, private, open to visitors
- Château de Bricquebec in Bricquebec, owned by local authority, open to visitors
- Manoir de Brion in Dragey-Ronthon private
- Le Câtelet (castle motte) in Beuzeville-la-Bastille
- Château de Chanteloup in Chanteloup, private
- Château de Charuel in Sacey private
- Manoir de Coutainville in Agon-Coutainville private
- Château de Crosville in Crosville-sur-Douve private, open to visitors
- Château de Ganne in La Haye-Pesnel, ruined, site may be freely visited
- Château de Gavray in Gavray, private, site may be freely visited
- Manoir de Graffard in Barneville-Carteret, private, exterior may be seen
- Château de Gratot in Gratot private, open to visitors
- Château de la Mare in Jullouville, private
- Manoir de Mesnil-Vitey in Airel, private
- Château des Montgommery in Ducey, partially demolished, partially private, open to visitors
- Château de la Palluelle in Saint-James, private
- Château de Pirou in Pirou private, open to visitors
- Château de Plain-Marais in Beuzeville-la-Bastille, private
- Château de Querqueville in Querqueville, owned by local authority, open to visitors (town hall)
- Château des Ravalet with botanic gardens in Tourlaville, Cherbourg-Octeville, owned by local authority, open to visitors
- Château de Regnéville in Regnéville-sur-Mer, open to visitors
- Château de Rochemont in Saussemesnil, private
- Château de la Roche-Tesson in La Colombe, ruined, private
- Château des Ruettes in Blainville-sur-Mer, private
- Château de Saint-Pair in Saint-Pair, disappeared
- Manoir de Saint-Ortaire, au Dézert private
- Château du Tourps in Anneville-en-Saire, vestiges of the feudal manor, 18th-century château, private, visible from outside
- Manoir de Vauville and its botanical gardens in Vauville, private, open to visitors

=== Orne ===
- Manoir de la Bérardière in Saint-Bômer-les-Forges
- Château du Bourg-Saint-Léonard at Bourg-Saint-Léonard
- Château de Carrouges in Carrouges
- Donjon de Chambois in Chambois
- Château de Couterne in Couterne
- Château de Domfront in Domfront
- Château des Ducs d'Alençon in Alençon
- Château des ducs in Argentan
- Château de Flers in Flers
- Château de La Fresnaye in La Fresnaye-au-Sauvage. Birthplace of Nicolas Vauquelin Des Yveteaux (1567–1649), French poet.
- Château de Marchainville in Marchainville
- Château de Médavy in Médavy
- Château de Messei in Messei
- Château de la Motte, Joué du Plain
- Château d'Ô in Mortrée
- Château du Repas in Chênedouit
- Château de Sassy in Saint-Christophe-le-Jajolet
- Château de Villiers in Essay
- Château de Vimer in Guerquesalles

== Upper Normandy ==
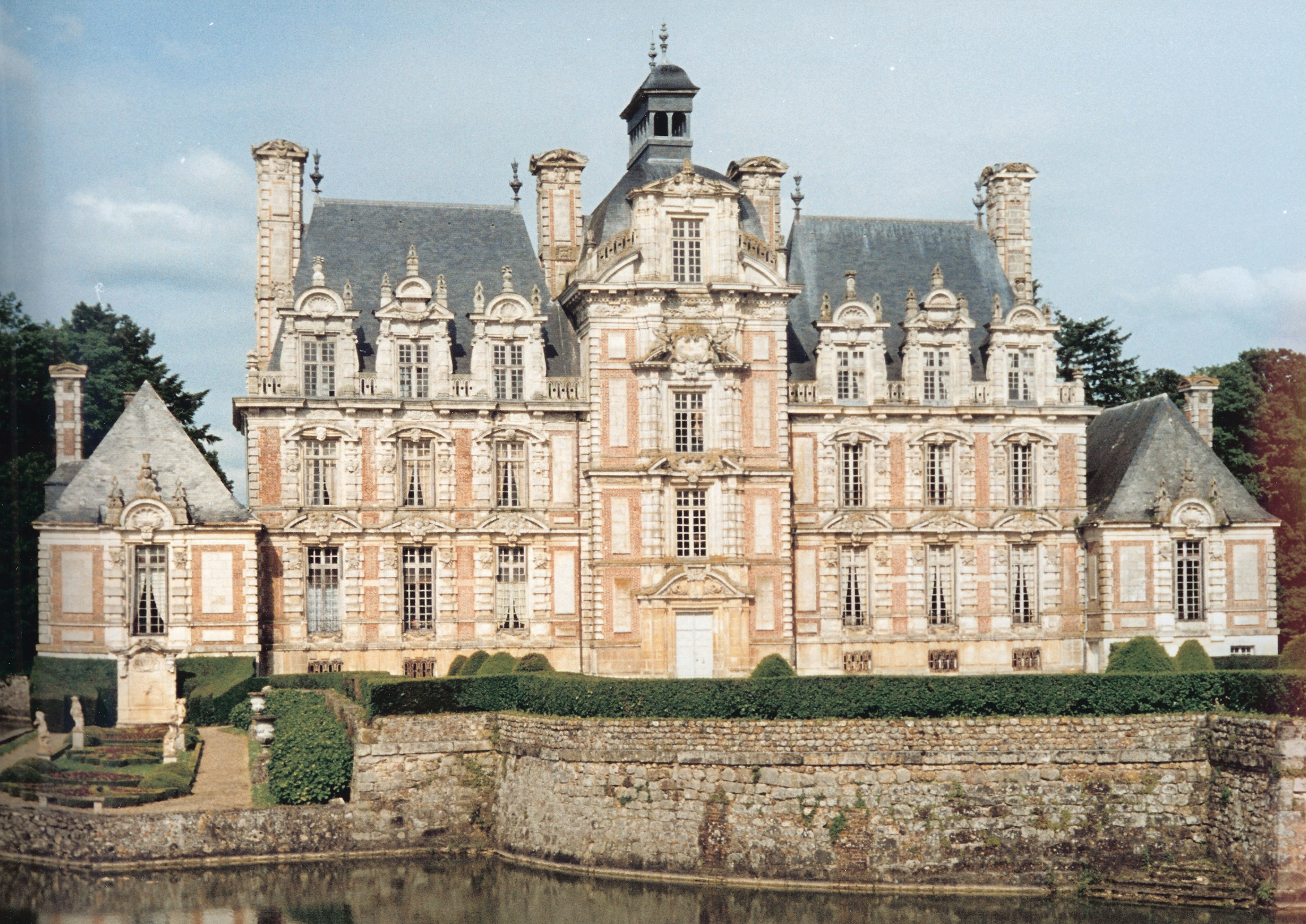
Château de Beaumesnil

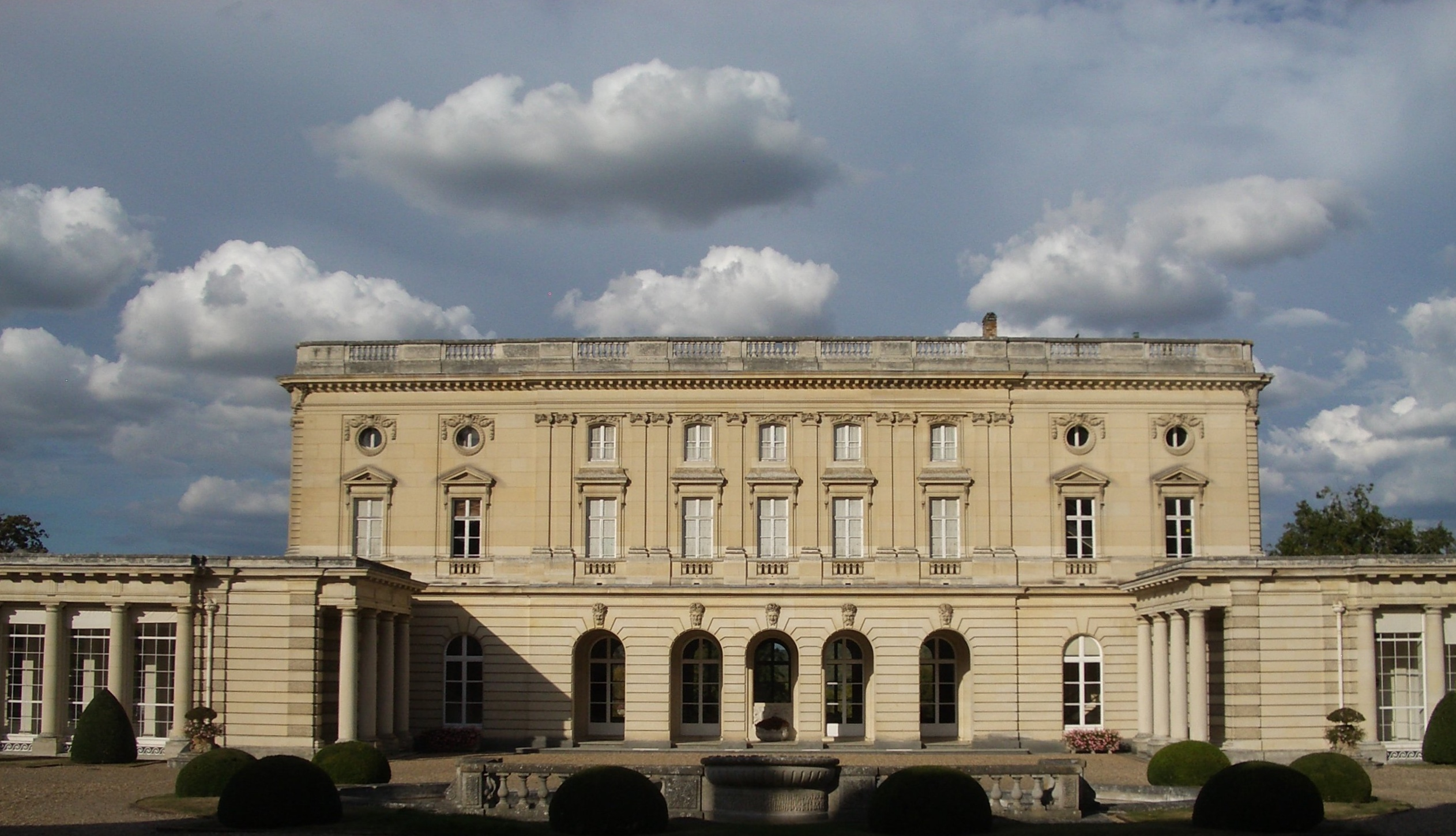
château de Bizy

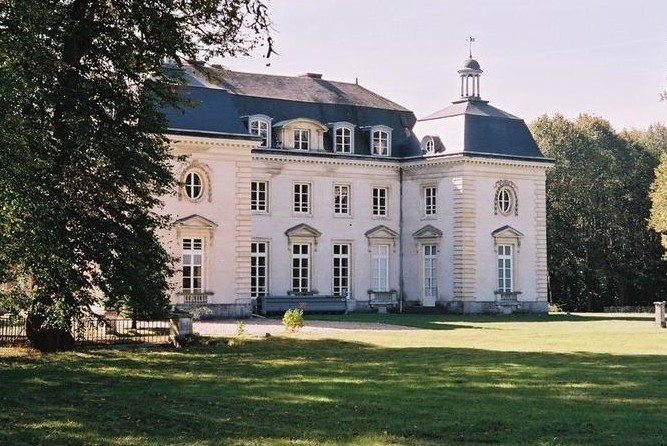
Château du Buisson de May made by the Royal Architect Jacques Denis Antoine in the 18th century

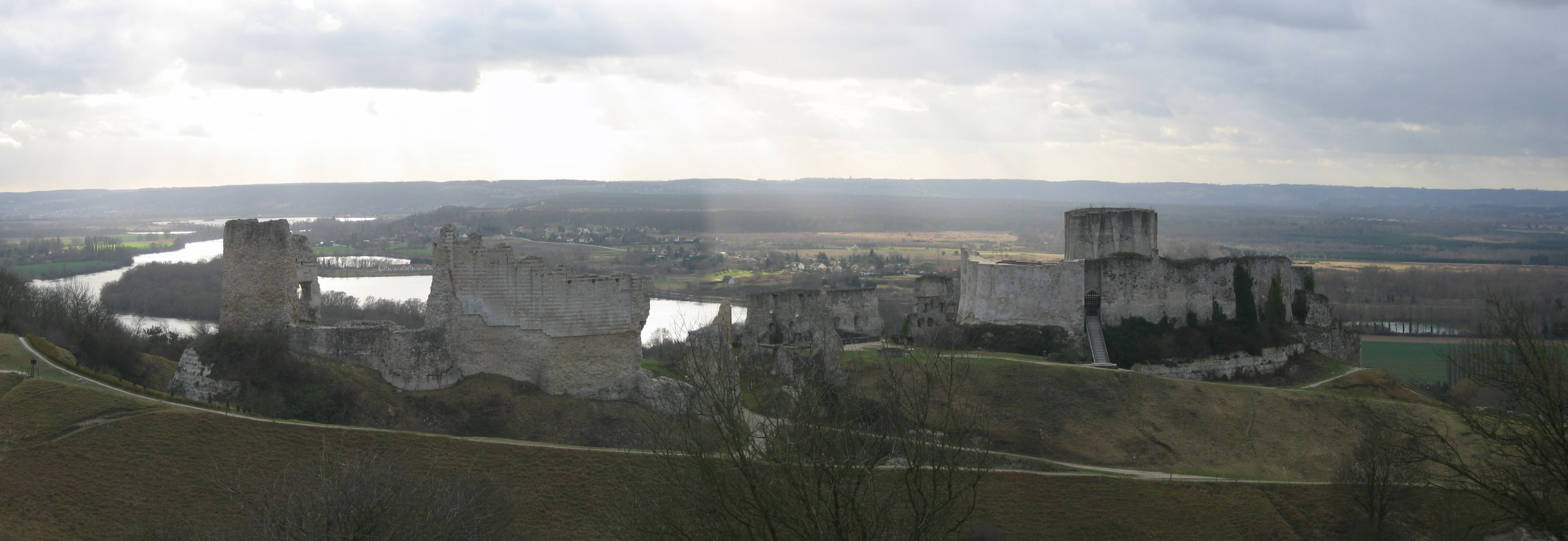
Château-Gaillard

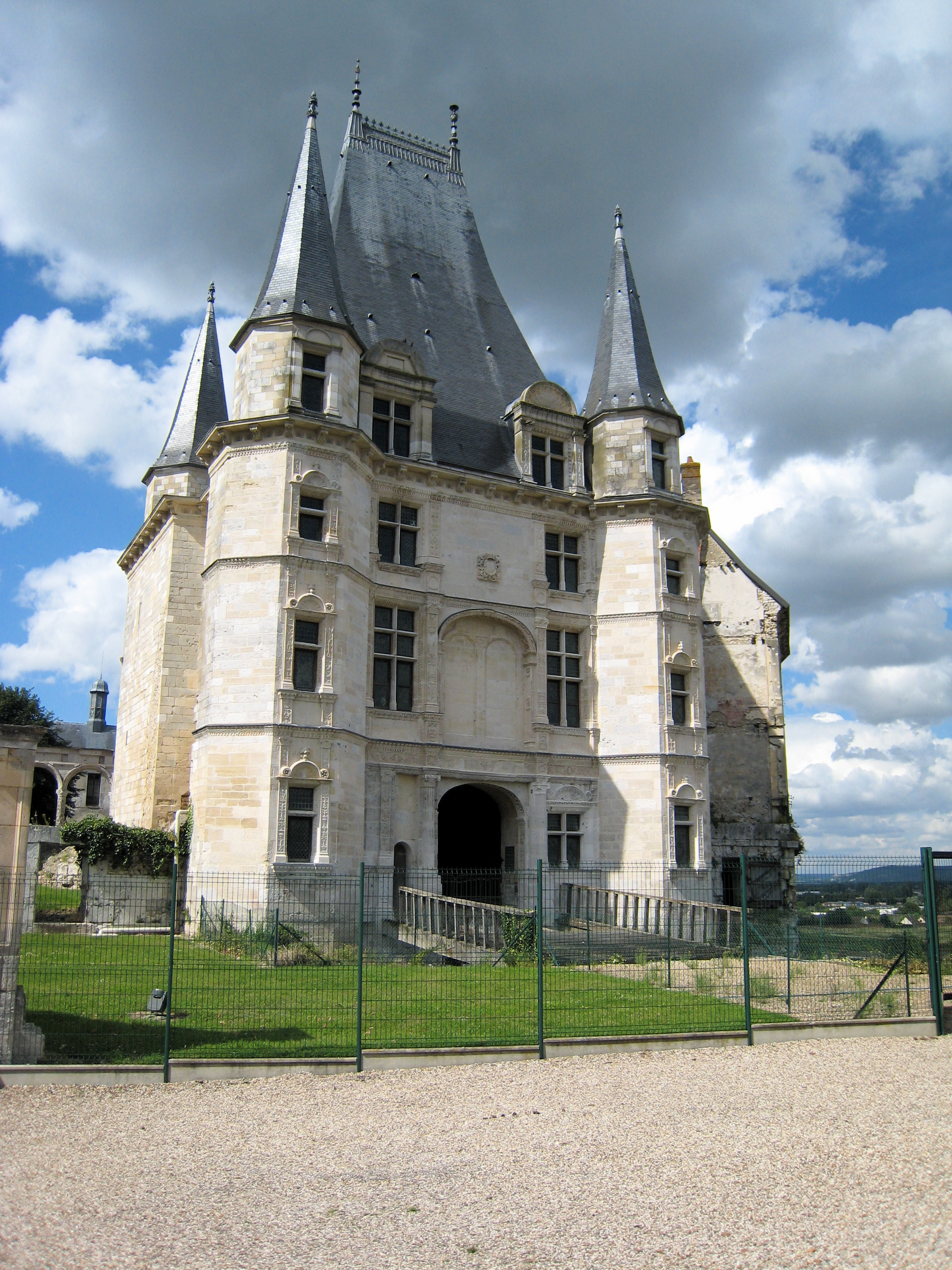
Château de Gaillon

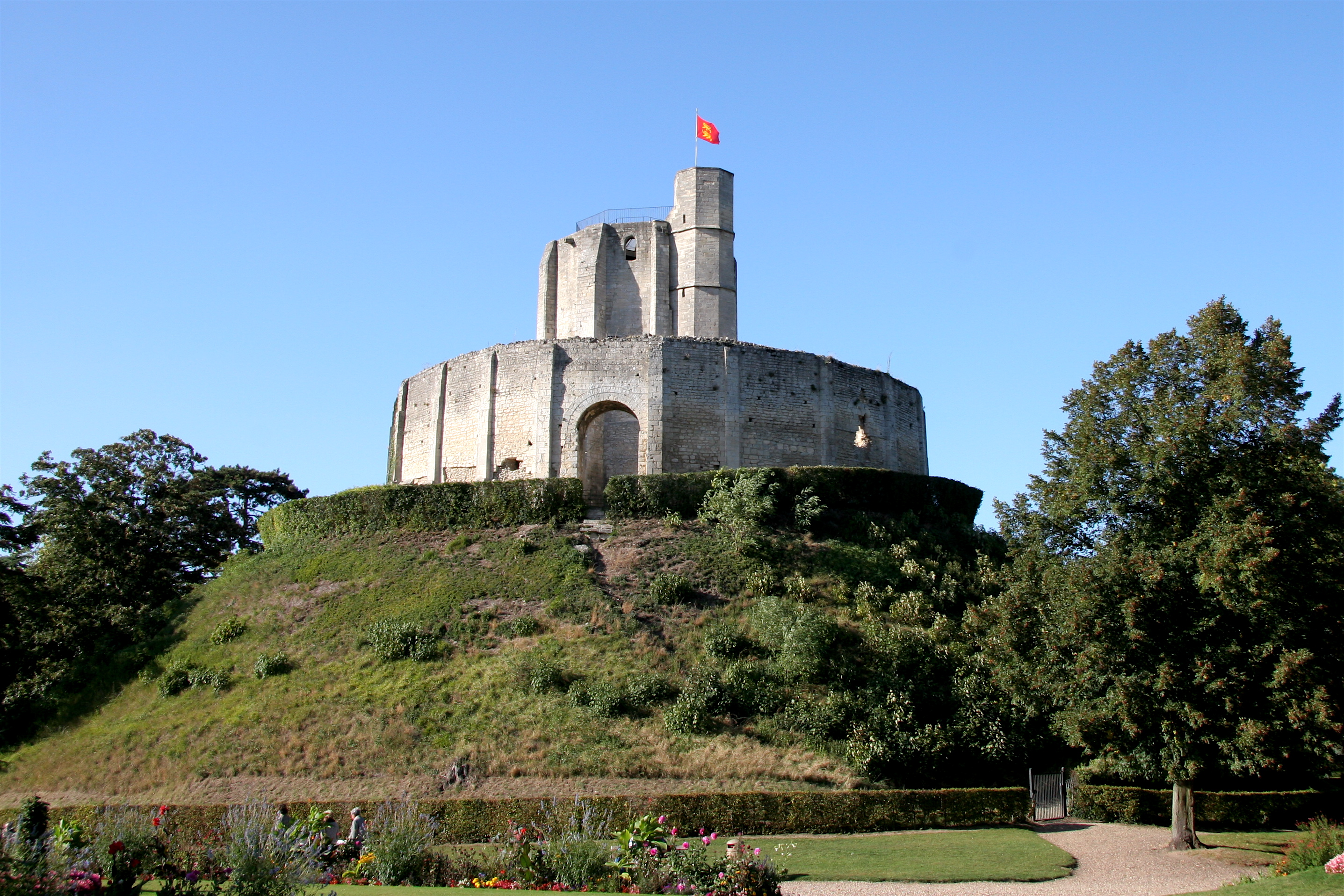
Château de Gisors

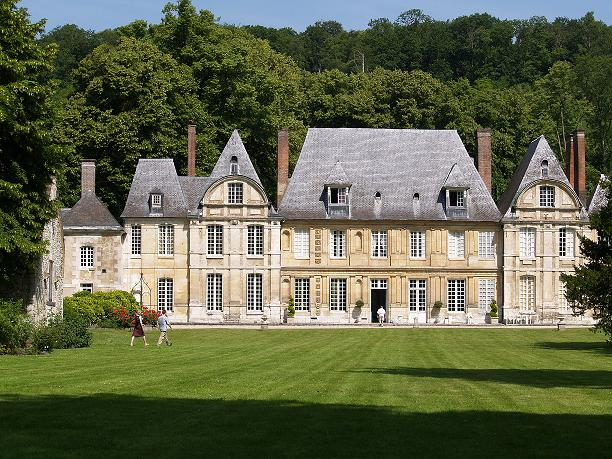
Château du Taillis

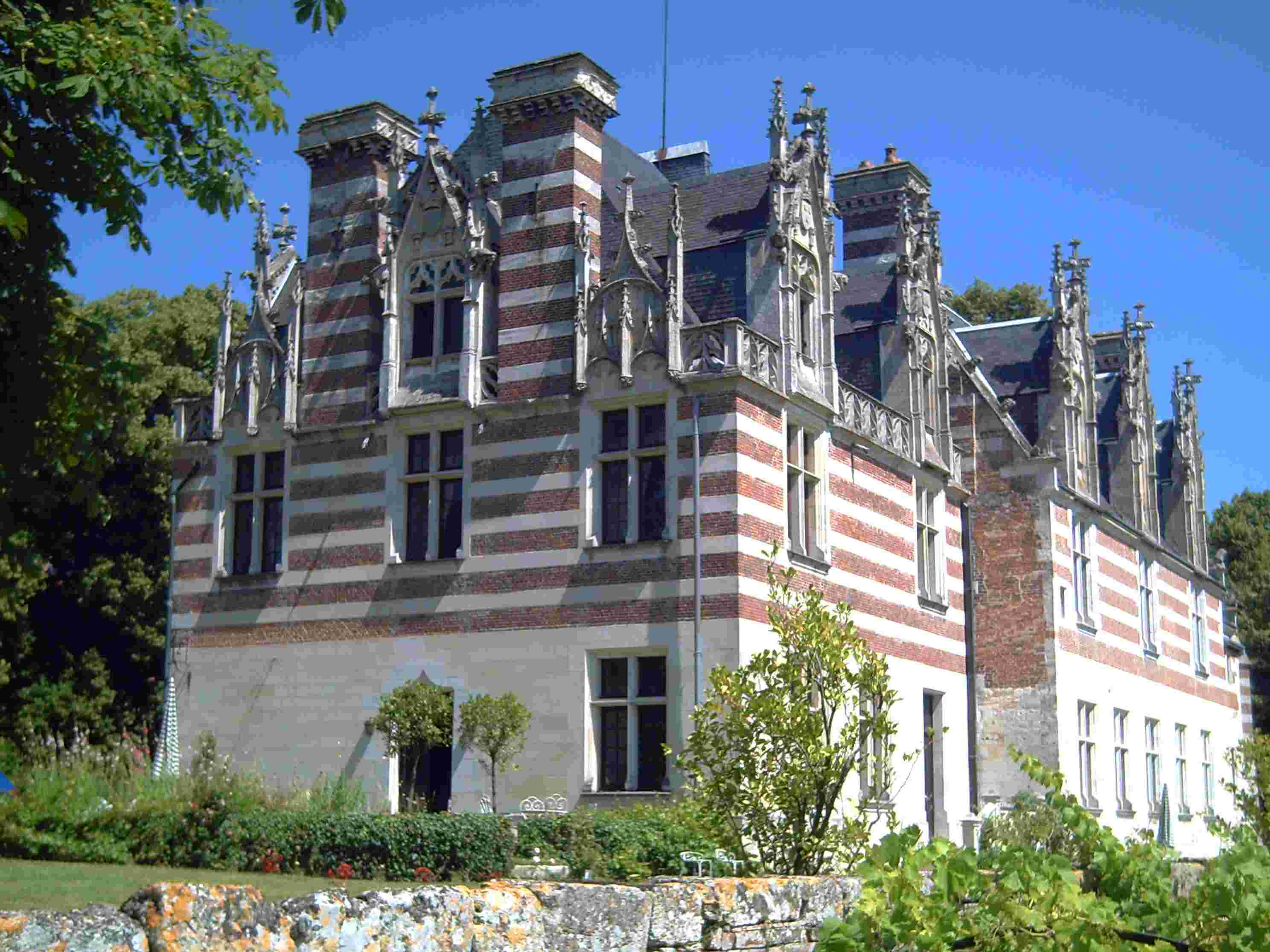
Château d'Etelan

=== Eure ===
- Château d'Acquigny in Acquigny
- Tour des Archives in Vernon
- Château de Beaumesnil in Beaumesnil
- Château de Bizy in Vernon
- Château de Bonnemare in Radepont
- Château de Bonneville, in Chamblac
- Château de Brécourt in Douains
- Château du Buisson de May in Saint Aquilin de Pacy
- Château du Champ de Bataille, in Neubourg
- Château Gaillard, in Andelys
- Château-sur-Epte Castle in Château-sur-Epte
- Château de Conches-en-Ouche in Conches-en-Ouche
- Château de Fleury-la-Forêt in Fleury-la-Forêt
- Château de Gaillon in Gaillon
- Château de Gisors in Gisors
- Château d'Harcourt in Harcourt
- Château de Houlbec-près-le-Gros-Theil in Houlbec-près-le-Gros-Theil
- Château d'Ivry-la-Bataille in Ivry-la-Bataille
- Fort de Limaie in Igoville
- Château de la Madeleine in Pressagny-l'Orgueilleux
- Château de Montaure in Montaure
- Château de Petiteville
- Château du Plessis-Bouquelon in Bouquelon
- Château Sainte-Marie in Vernon
- Château de Saint-Gervais in St Gervais
- Château de Saint-Just in Saint-Just
- Château de Tilly in Boissey-le-Châtel
- Château des Tourelles in Vernon
- Château de Vascœuil in Vascœuil
- Château de Verneuil-sur-Avre in Verneuil-sur-Avre

=== Seine-Maritime ===
- Manoir d'Ango in Varengeville-sur-Mer
- Château d'Arques-la-Bataille in Arques-la-Bataille
- Manoir d'Auffay in Oherville
- Château de Bailleul in Angerville-Bailleul
- Château de Bellencombre in Bellencombre
- Château du Bosc Théroulde in Bosc-Guérard-Saint-Adrien
- Château de Bosmelet in Auffay
- Château de Cany in Cany-Barville
- Manoir du Catel in Écretteville-lès-Baons
- Château de Dieppe in Dieppe
- Château d'Ételan in Saint-Maurice-d'Ételan
- Château d'Eu in Eu
- Château de Fécamp in Fécamp
- Château de Filières in Gommerville
- Château de Galleville in Doudeville
- Château du Manais in Ferrières-en-Bray
- Château de Martainville in Martainville-Épreville
- Château de Mauny in Mauny
- Château de Mesnières in Mesnières-en-Bray
- Château de Miromesnil in Tourville-sur-Arques
- Château d'Orcher in Gonfreville-l'Orcher
- Manoir de Pierre Corneille in Petit-Couronne
- Château de la Rivière-Bourdet in Quevillon
- Château de Robert-le-Diable in Moulineaux
- Château de Rouen et Tour Jeanne d'Arc, in Rouen

° Chateau de Sommesnil in Sommesnil

- Château du Taillis in Duclair
- Château de Tancarville in Tancarville
- Château du Val des Leux in Mauny
- Château du Vaudroc in Limpiville
- Manoir de Villers in Saint-Pierre-de-Manneville
- Château d'Yville

== Notes and references ==
Les châteaux de Normandie at Paris-Normandie.fr

== See also ==
- List of castles in France
