= Château de Plain-Marais =

Historic castle in Manche, Normandy, France

Coordinates: 49.3531°N 1.3722°W

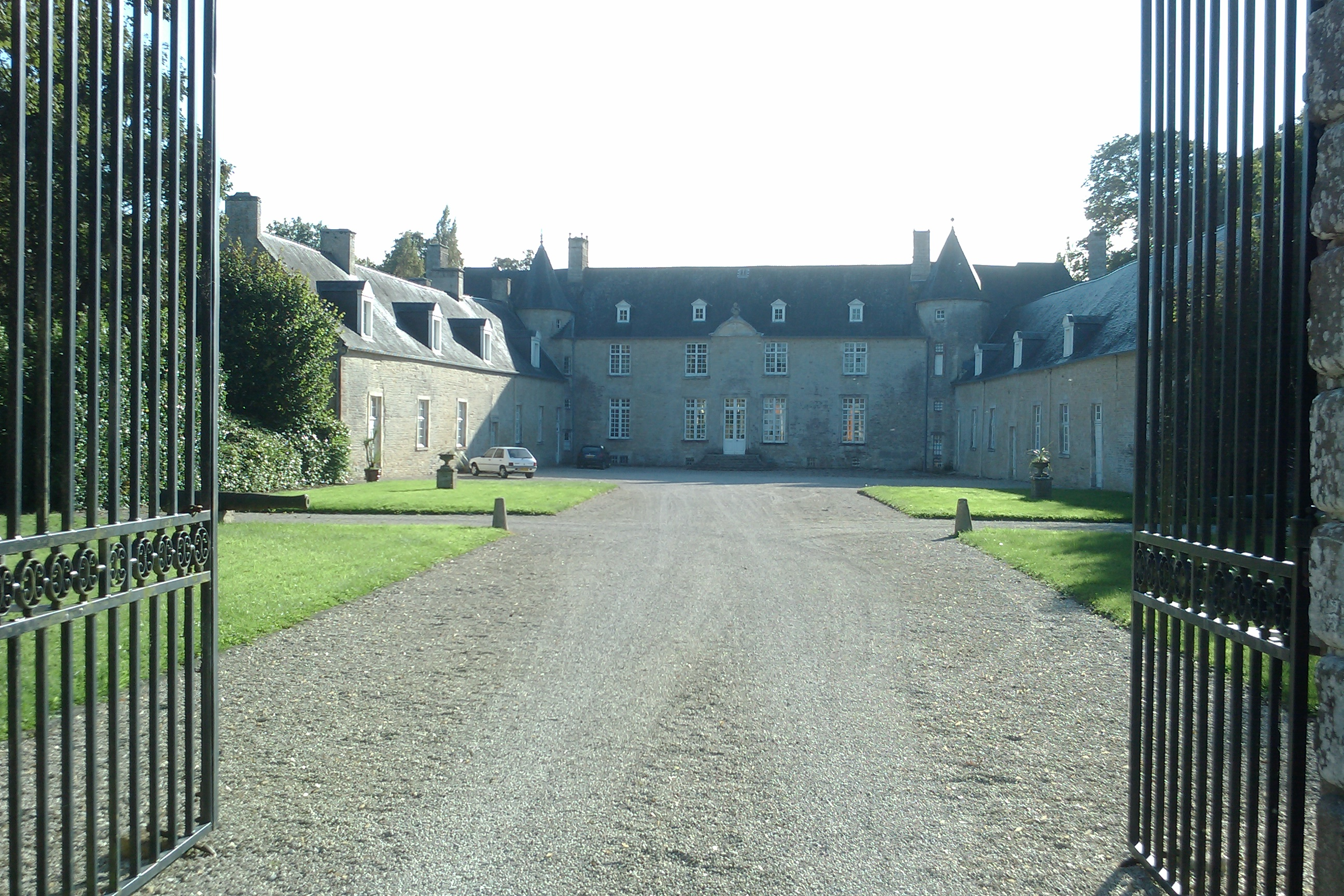
- Château de Plain-Marais in 2011
- Interactive map of the Château de Plain-Marais area

The Château de Plain-Marais (French pronunciation: [ʃato də plɛ̃ maʁɛ]) is an historic castle in Beuzeville-la-Bastille, Manche, Lower Normandy, France.

== History ==
The castle was built during the Hundred Years' War.

It was the private residence of Olivier Le Clerc de Juigné, who served as a member of the Chamber of Deputies from 1815 to 1816.

== Architectural significance ==
It has been designated as a monument historique since 1975.
