= Château d'Eu =

Monument historique in Normandy, France

Coordinates: 50°2′58″N 1°25′1″E

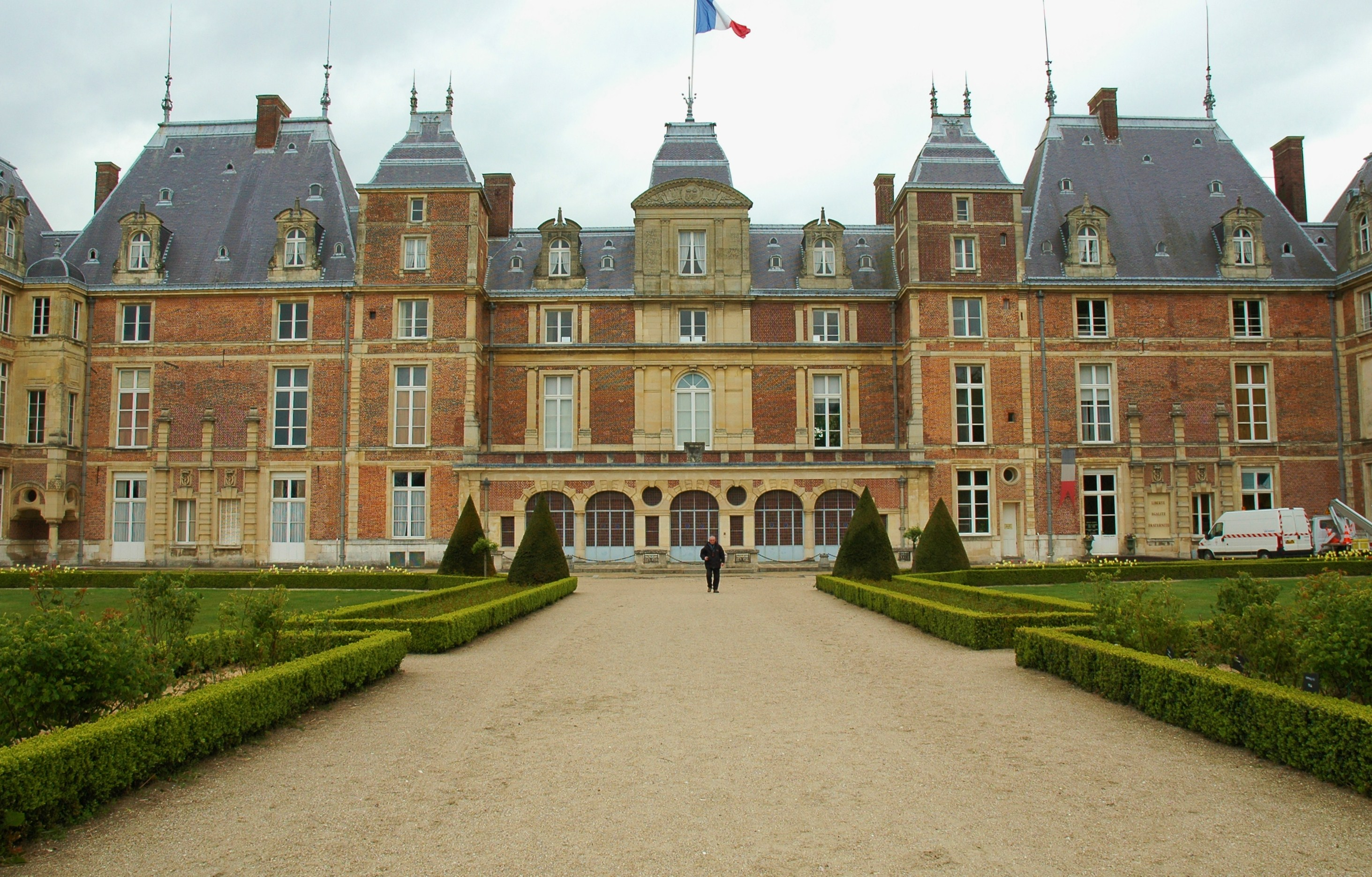
Château d'Eu

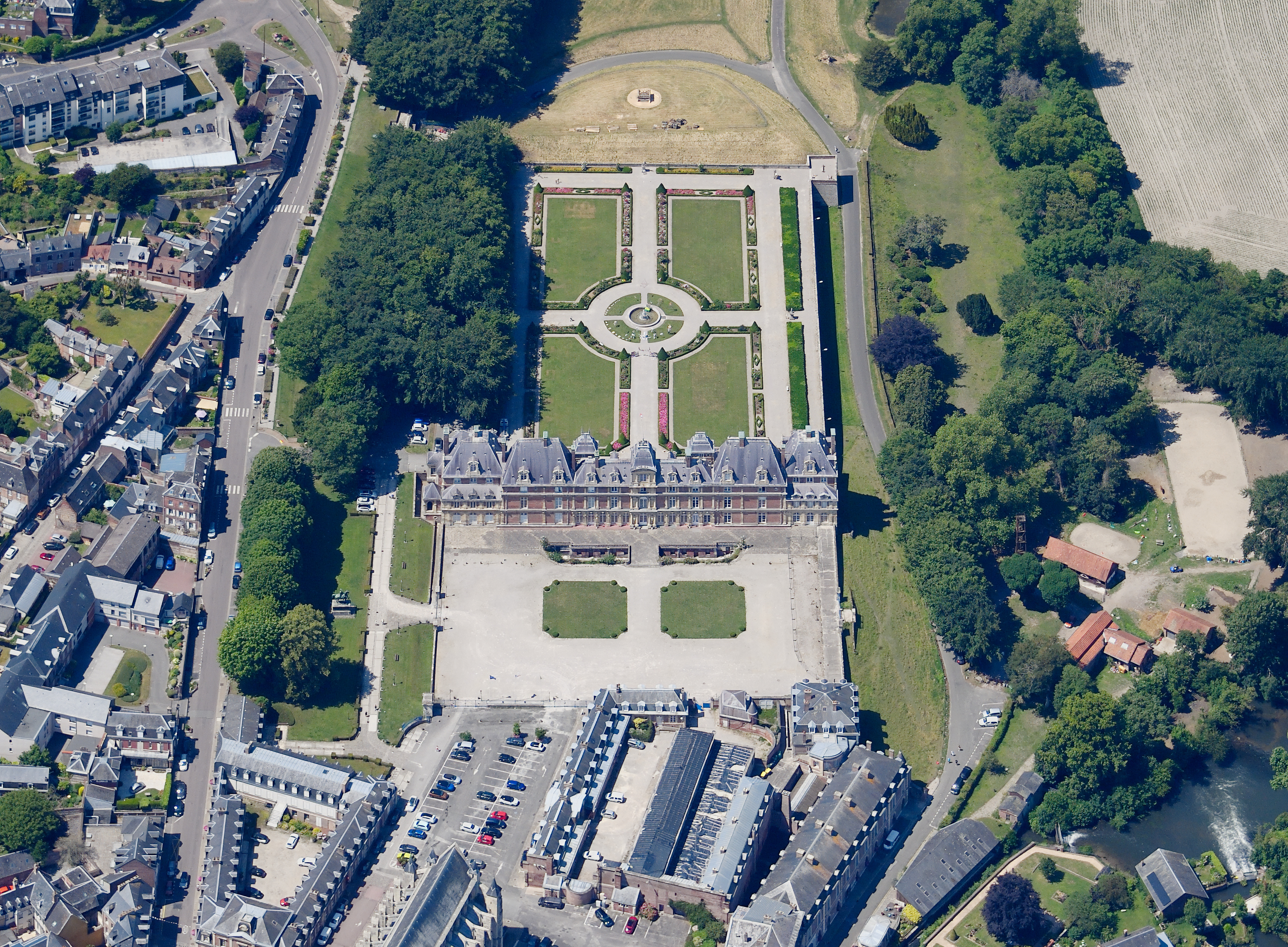
Aerial view of Château d'Eu and its park

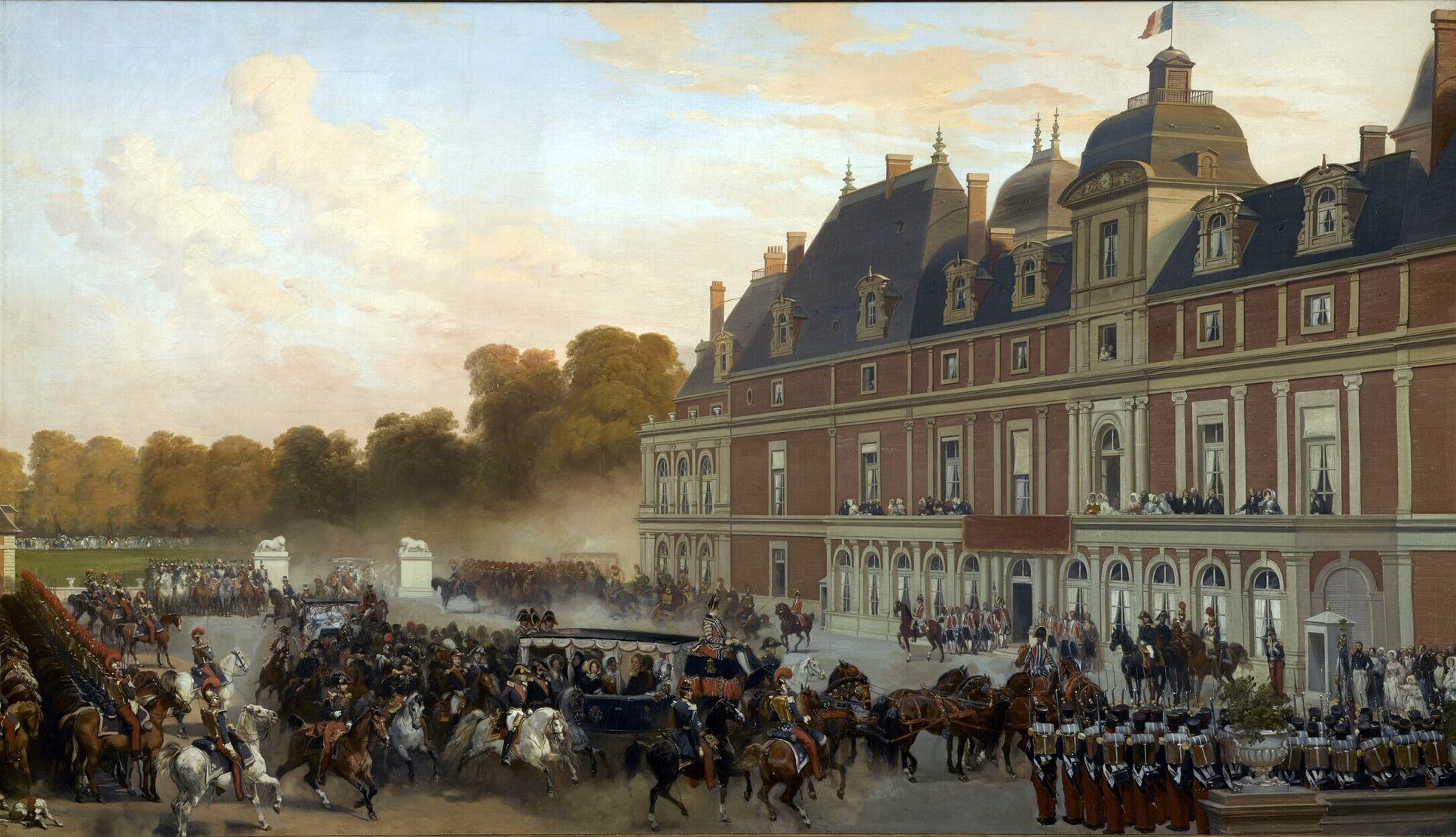
The Arrival of Queen Victoria at the Château d'Eu, by Eugène Lami, 1843

The Château d'Eu (French pronunciation: [ʃato dø]) is a former royal residence in the town of Eu, in the Seine-Maritime department of France, in Normandy.

The Château d'Eu stands at the centre of the town and was built in the 16th century to replace an earlier one purposely demolished in 1475 to prevent its capture by the English. The chapel contains the tombs of Henry I, Duke of Guise, and his wife, Catherine de Clèves, who embarked on the construction of the château in 1578. The building was completed almost a century later by the Anne Marie Louise d'Orléans, Duchess of Montpensier, la Grande Mademoiselle.

Between 1830 and 1848, the château, which had been the property of the House of Orléans since its acquisition by La Grande Mademoiselle in October 1657, served as King Louis-Philippe I's summer residence.

Louis-Philippe twice entertained Queen Victoria at the château, from 3 to 7 September 1843 and from 8 to 10 September 1845.

The château became residence of the Brazilian Imperial Family during the exile. Isabel, Princess Imperial of Brazil, who brought slavery to an end in Brazil in 1888, died at the château in 1921. Her husband was Prince Gaston, Count of Eu, a grandson of King Louis Philippe I. Their eldest son, Pedro de Alcântara, Prince of Grão-Pará, sold the château to the Brazilian entrepreneur Assis Chateaubriand.

In 1964, the city of Eu acquired the château, in which, in 1973, it installed its City Hall and created the Musée Louis-Philippe.

In 1987, the castle, its dependencies and park were classified a Monument historique by the French Ministry of Culture.

== See also ==
- List of châteaux in Normandy
