= Château de Colombières =

Medieval castle in Normandy, France

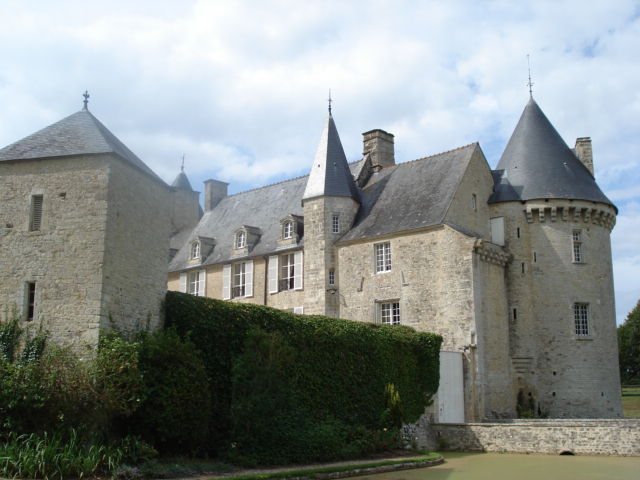
- Interactive map of the Château de Colombières area

General information
- Type: Medieval Castle
- Location: Normandy, France
- Coordinates: 49.301014°N 0.975205°W
- Completed: 14th century
- Owner: Étienne de Maupeou

Website
- www.chateaudecolombieres.com

The Château de Colombières is a medieval castle built during the 14th century in Colombières, Calvados, Normandy, France. The Château de Colombières is a military fortress from the feudal era in Lower Normandy. It was constructed between Bayeux and Isigny-sur-Mer, close to the D-Day beaches
