= Colombières =

- Commune
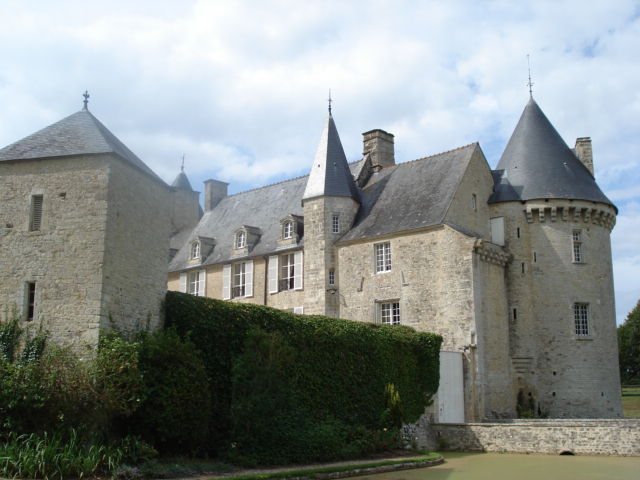
- Château de Colombières
- Location of Colombières
- Location within France Location within Normandy
- Coordinates: 49°17′49″N 0°58′48″W
- Country: France
- Region: Normandy
- Department: Calvados
- Arrondissement: Bayeux
- Canton: Trévières
- Intercommunality: CC Isigny-Omaha Intercom

Government
  - Mayor (2020–2026): Catherine Viel
- Area^{1}: 10.64 km^{2} (4.11 sq mi)
- Elevation: 15 m (49 ft)
- Highest elevation: 33 m (108 ft)
- Lowest elevation: 0 m (0 ft)
- Population (2023): 206
  - Density: 19.4/km^{2} (50.1/sq mi)
- Time zone: UTC+01:00 (CET)
  - Summer (DST): UTC+02:00 (CEST)
- INSEE/Postal code: 14168 /14710
- ^{1} French Land Register data, which excludes lakes, ponds, glaciers > 1 km^{2} (0.386 sq mi or 247 acres) and river estuaries.

Colombières (French pronunciation: [kɔlɔ̃bjɛʁ]) is a commune in the Calvados department in the Normandy region in northwestern France.

== Geography ==
Colombières is situated in the north-western region of Calvados, 20 kilometres west of Bayeux and 9 kilometres from Isigny-sur-Mer, in the natural regional park of Cotentin and Bessin.

== History ==
The village was freed on 9 June 1944 by the Allies. U.S. General Omar Bradley set up base for the Twelfth United States Army Group in Colombières castle.

== Places of interest ==
Colombières castle is a historic building, built between Bayeux and Isigny-sur-Mer, close to the D-Day landing beaches. It was one of the most famous forts in Lower Normandy while France was under Feudal rule. It is also known as : La vigie des Marais (The marsh lookout).

== Population ==
Historical population
Year	Pop.	±% p.a.
1968	306	—
1975	231	−3.94%
1982	247	+0.96%
1990	218	−1.55%
1999	225	+0.35%
2007	194	−1.84%
2012	204	+1.01%
2017	210	+0.58%
2023	206	−0.32%
Source: INSEE

== See also ==
- Communes of the Calvados department
