= Château de Pirou =

Castle in Manche, Normandy, France

Coordinates: 49°9′41″N 1°34′25″W

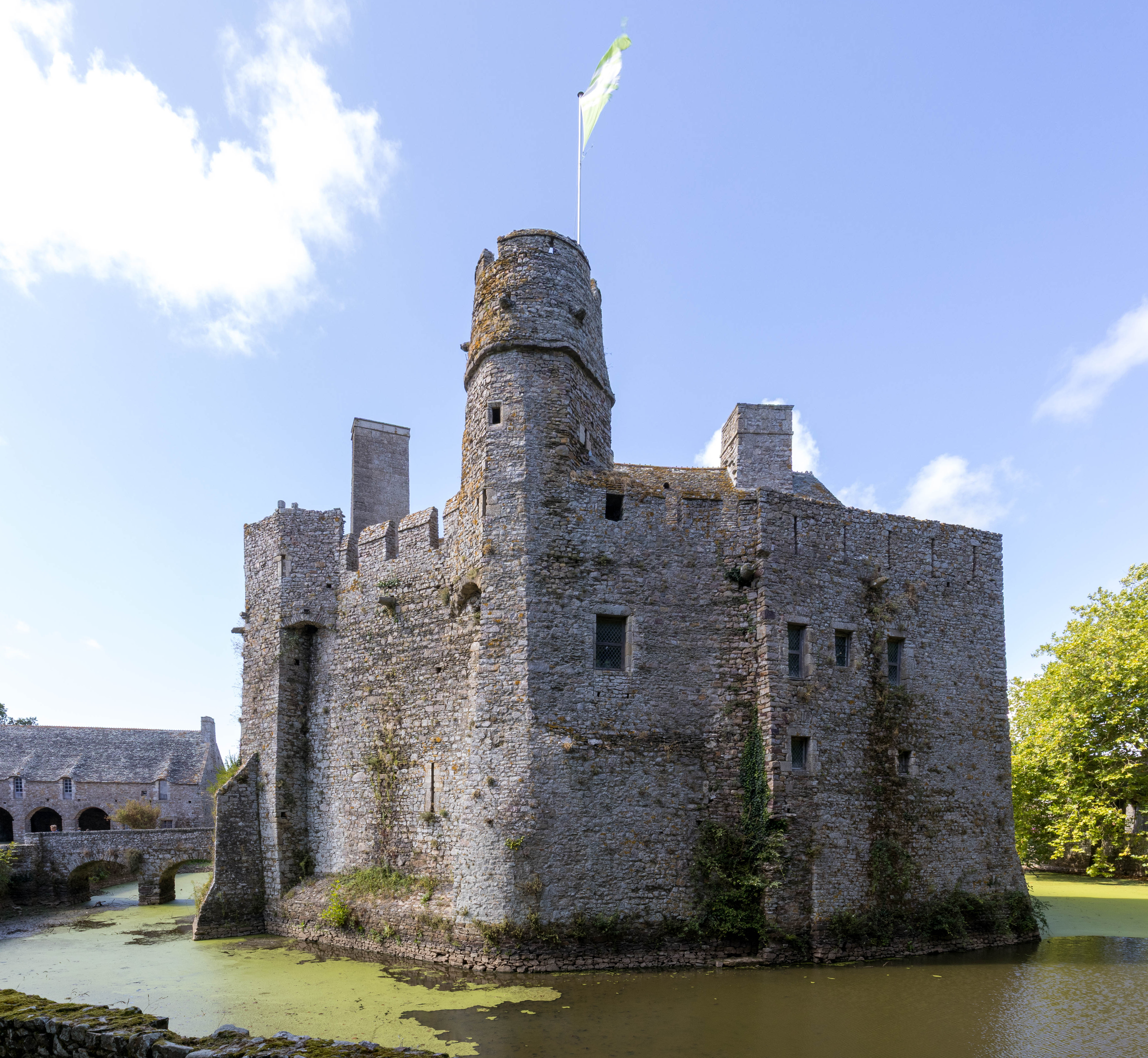
Keep of the Château de Pirou

The Château de Pirou is a castle in the commune of Pirou, in the département of Manche (Normandy), France.

The castle was initially built of wood, then of stone in the 12th century and belonged to the lords of Pirou. It was constructed near the shore of the English Channel, and used to watch upon the west coast of the Cotentin, to protect the town of Coutances and a strategic shallow-water harbour. As the coastline receded, the castle lost its strategic significance, and thus was not militarily upgraded as well as being spared the systematic destruction of fortifications (as seats of power and resistance to central governance) during the French Revolution and its aftermath.

In 1968 the castle was listed in the Inventaire supplémentaire des Monuments historiques by the French Ministry of Culture. Restoration was begun on the initiative of the abbot Marcel Lelégard (1925-1994).

The castle now lies in the middle of an artificial pond. The drawbridge has been replaced by a stone bridge. The curtain walls from the 12th century enclose two residential houses from two different periods (16th and 18th centuries). A barn on the premises houses a locally made tapestry, in the style of the Bayeux Tapestry, depicting historical events during a very lively period, from the Viking landings in the Cotentin to Norman conquest of southern Italy.

The Castle can be visited as a tourist attraction (note that it closes during lunchtime).

== Legend of the geese of Pirou ==
A famous legend of Normandy originates in the castle at Pirou. Besieged by the Vikings Normans, the Lord of Pirou and his family transformed themselves into geese, using an old wizard's book, in order to escape during the assault. When the geese returned, they tried to read the reverse spell to recover their human shapes, they realized that the wizard's book had been burnt with the castle, set on fire by the Vikings Normans. This is why wild geese stop in the Cotentin each year in March, during their annual migration.

== Gallery ==
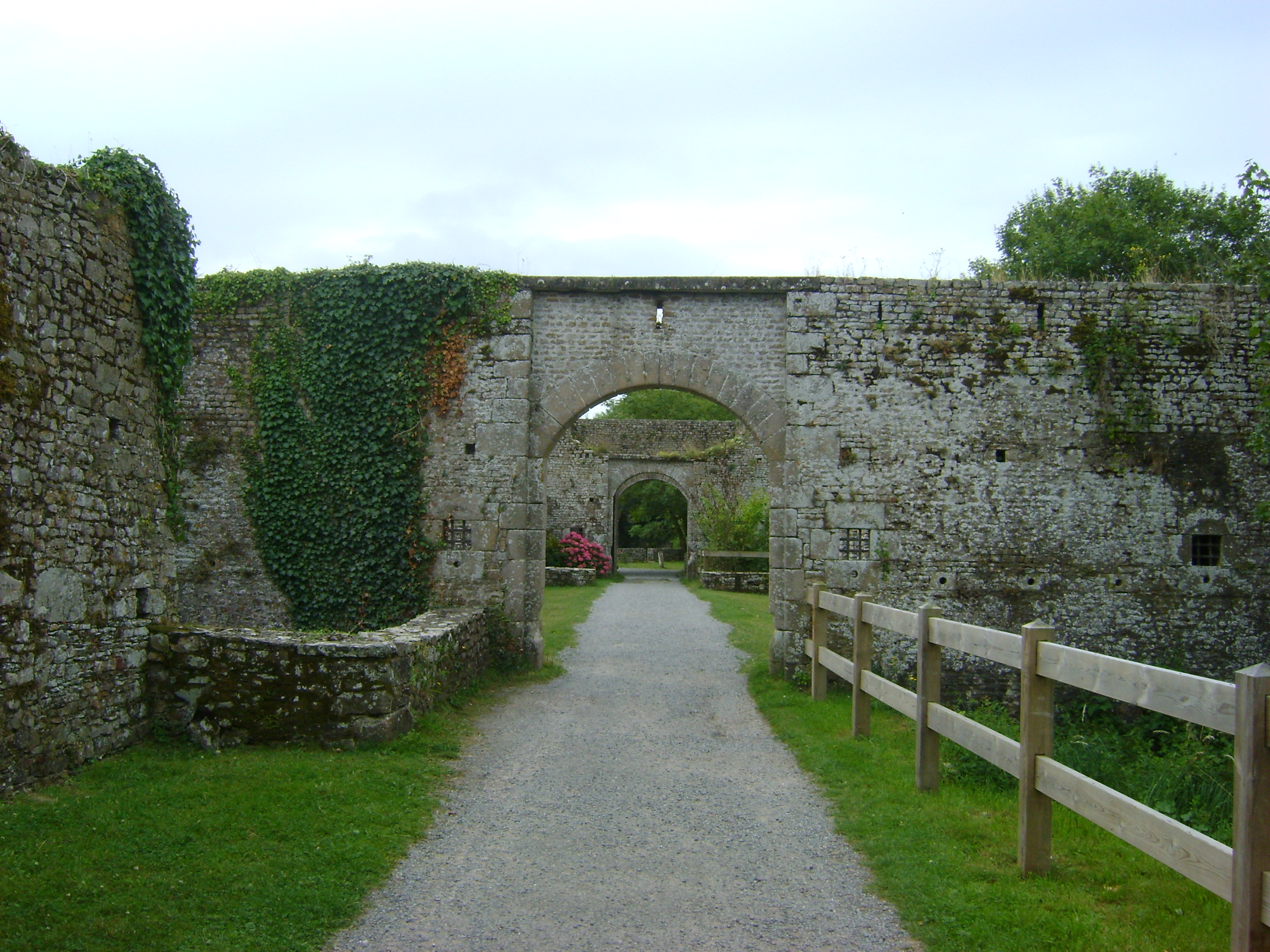
Exterior view of the first through third gates

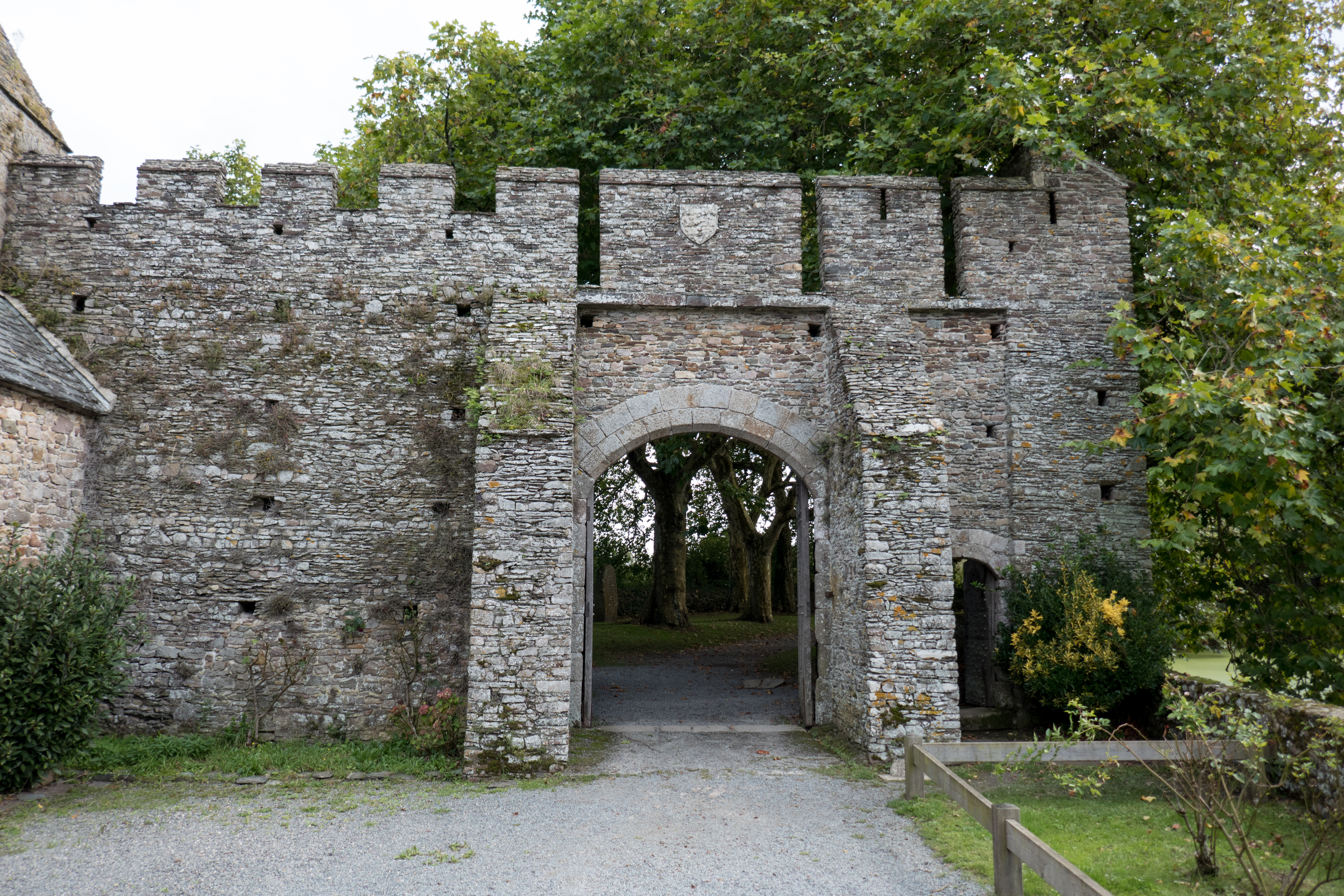
Exterior view of the fourth gate

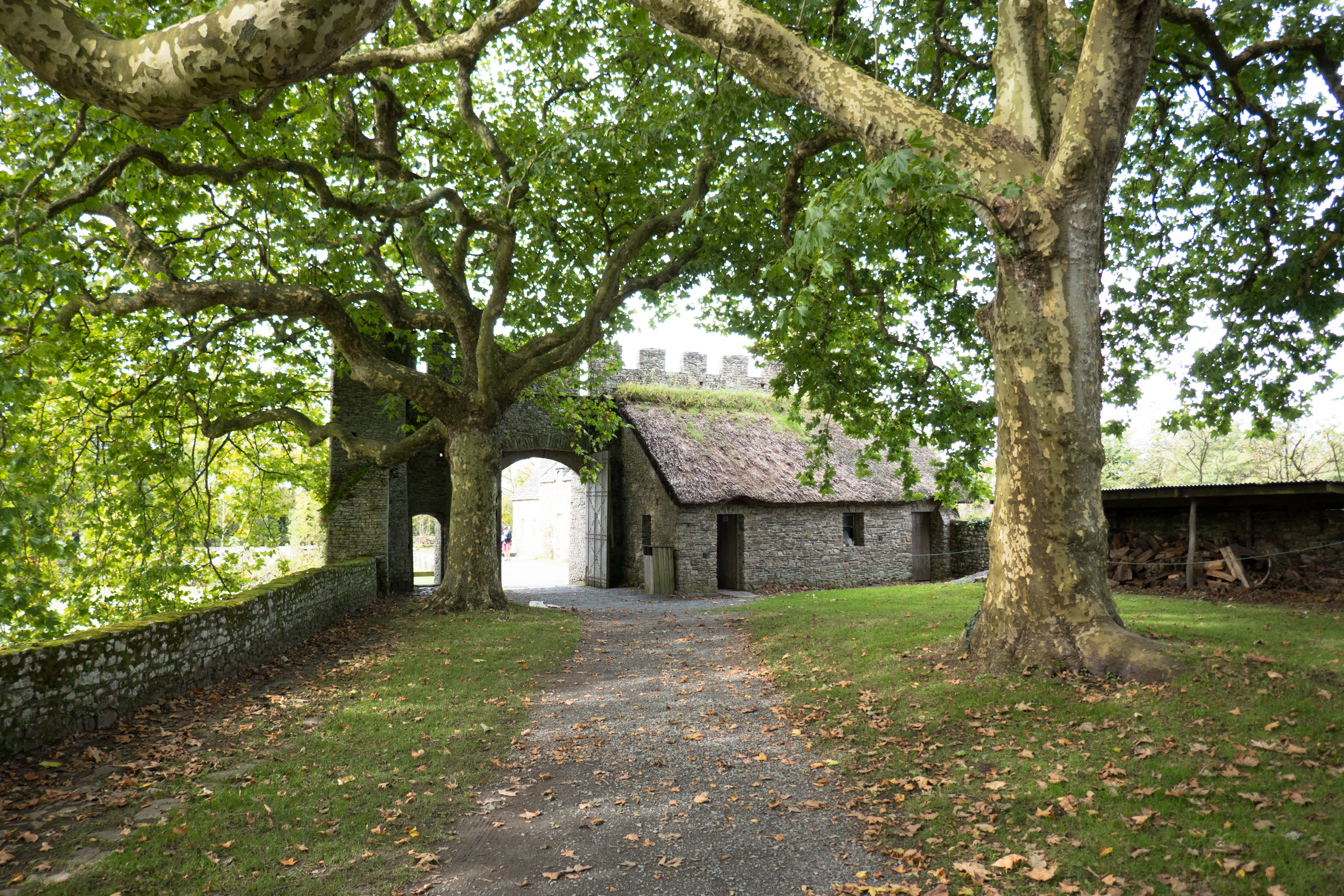
Interior view of the fourth gate

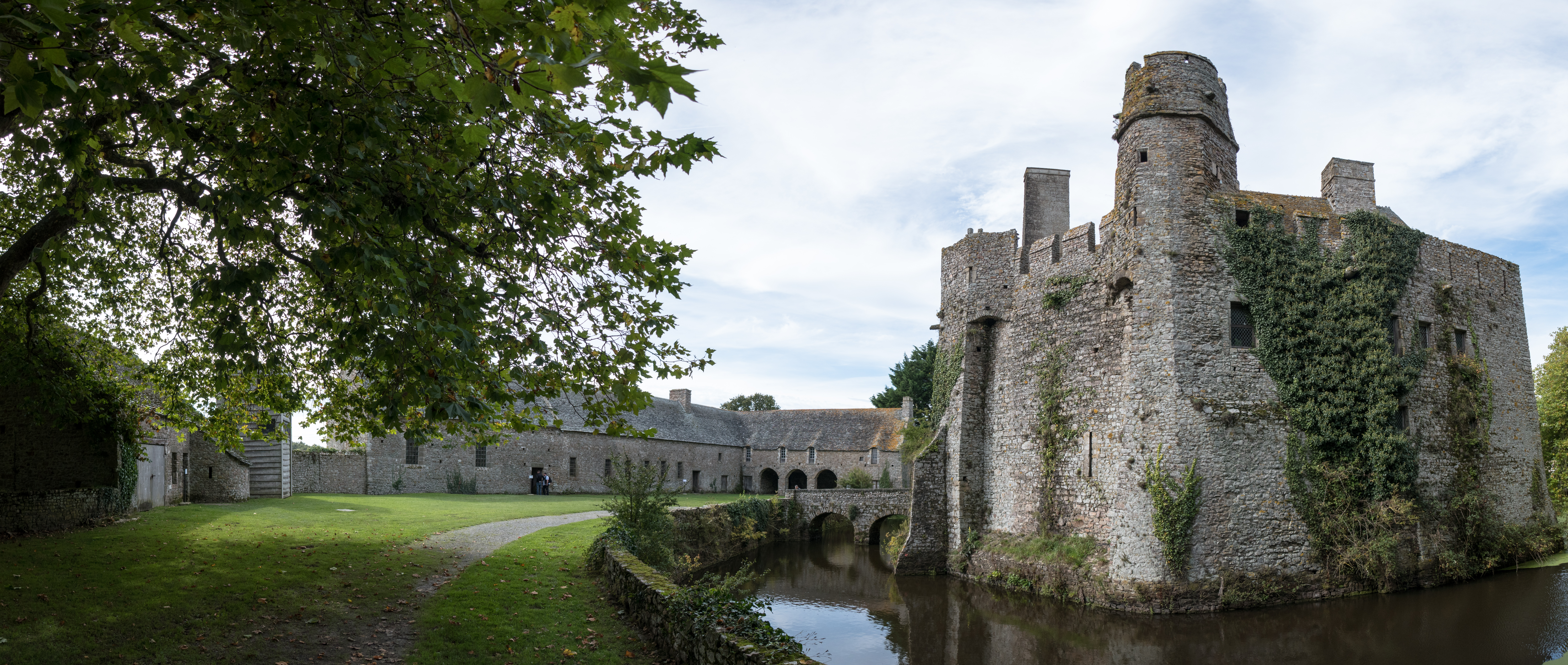
Panoramic view of the keep, the chapel and the placitum

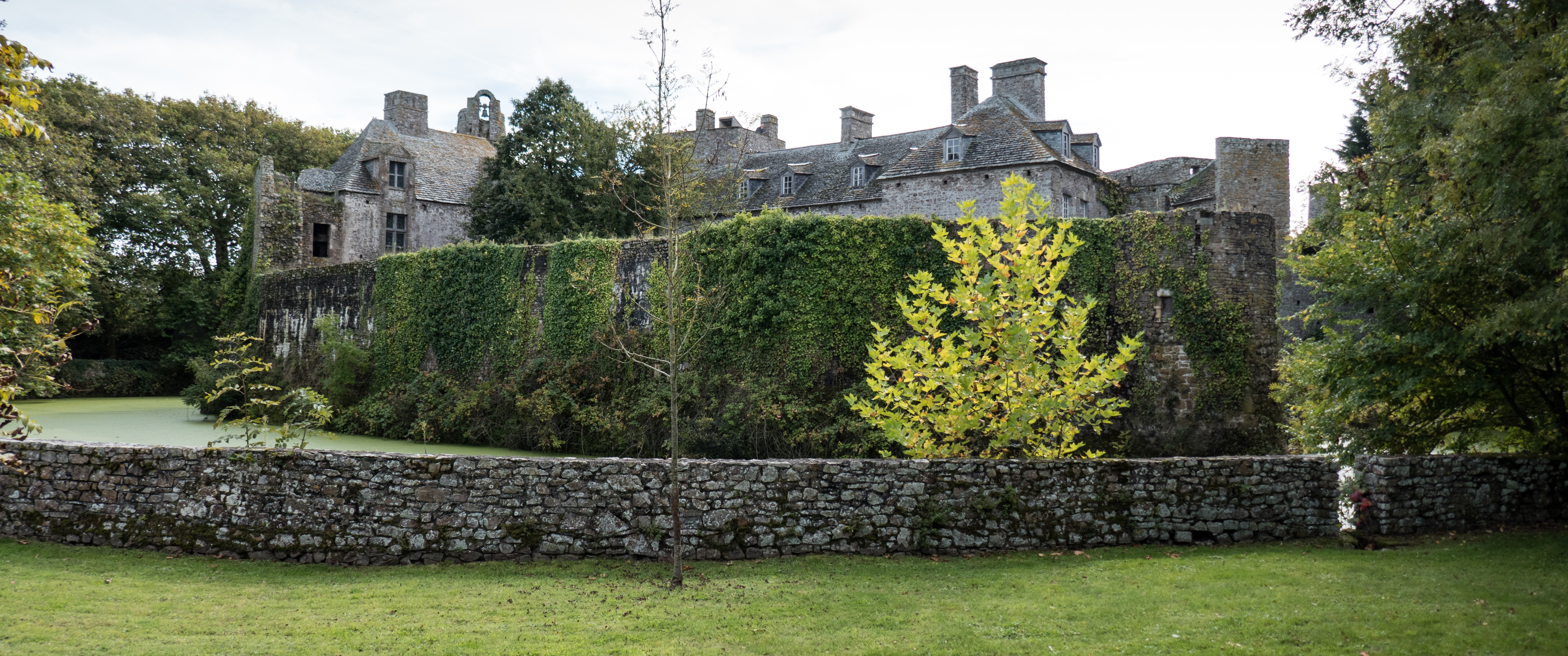
View of keep from behind

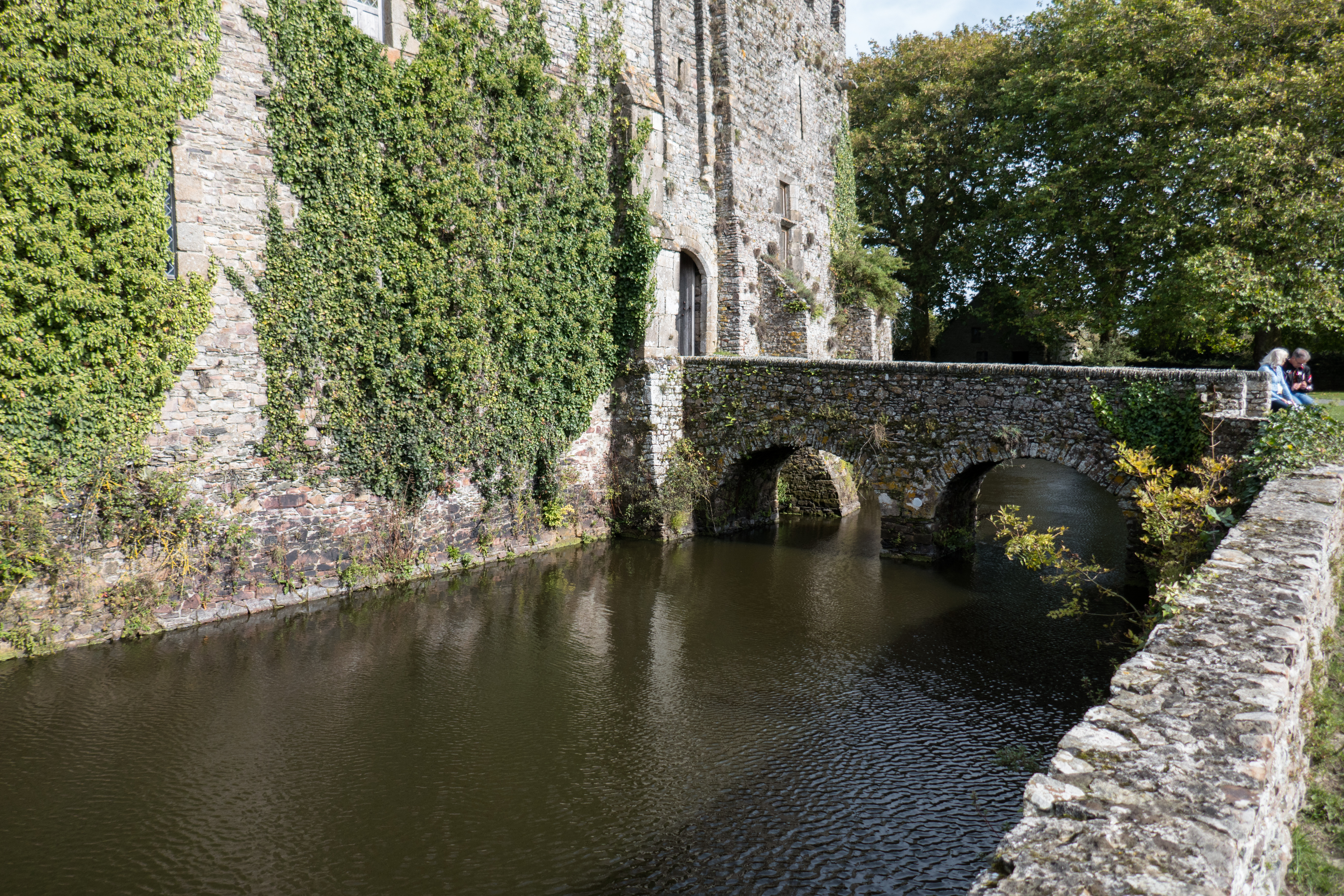
The bridge and moat

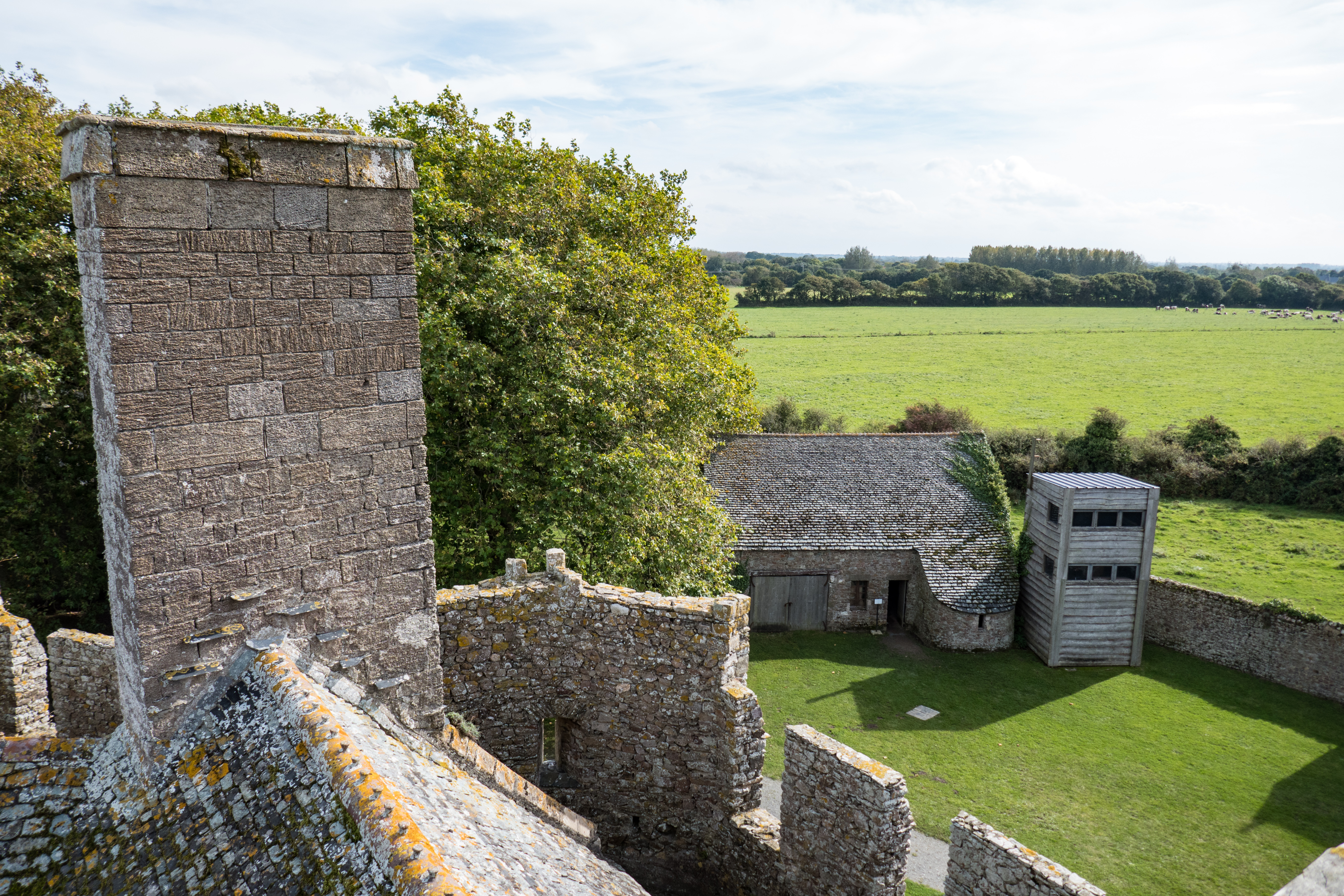
View from the ramparts facing South-East

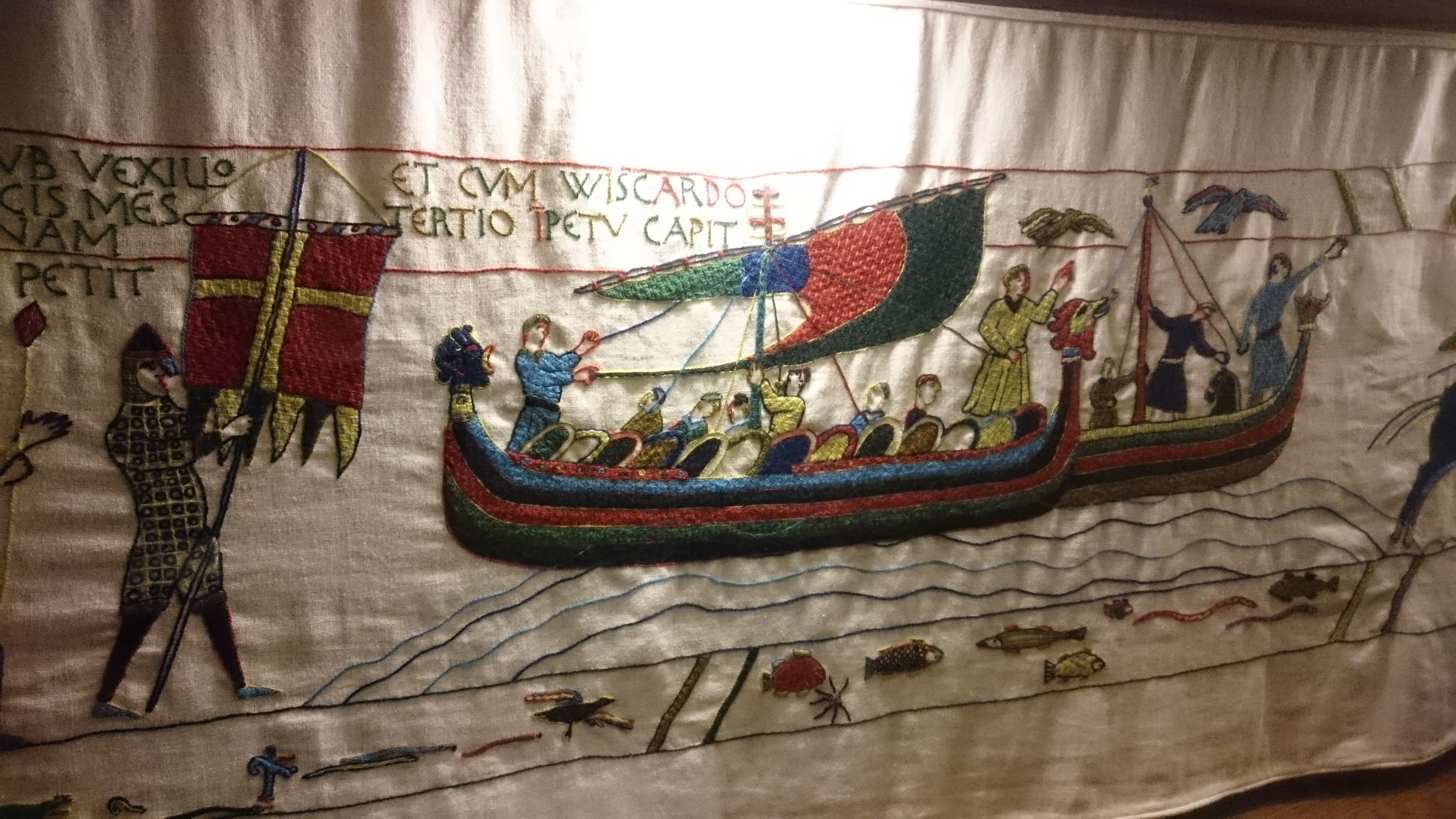
Tapestry on display

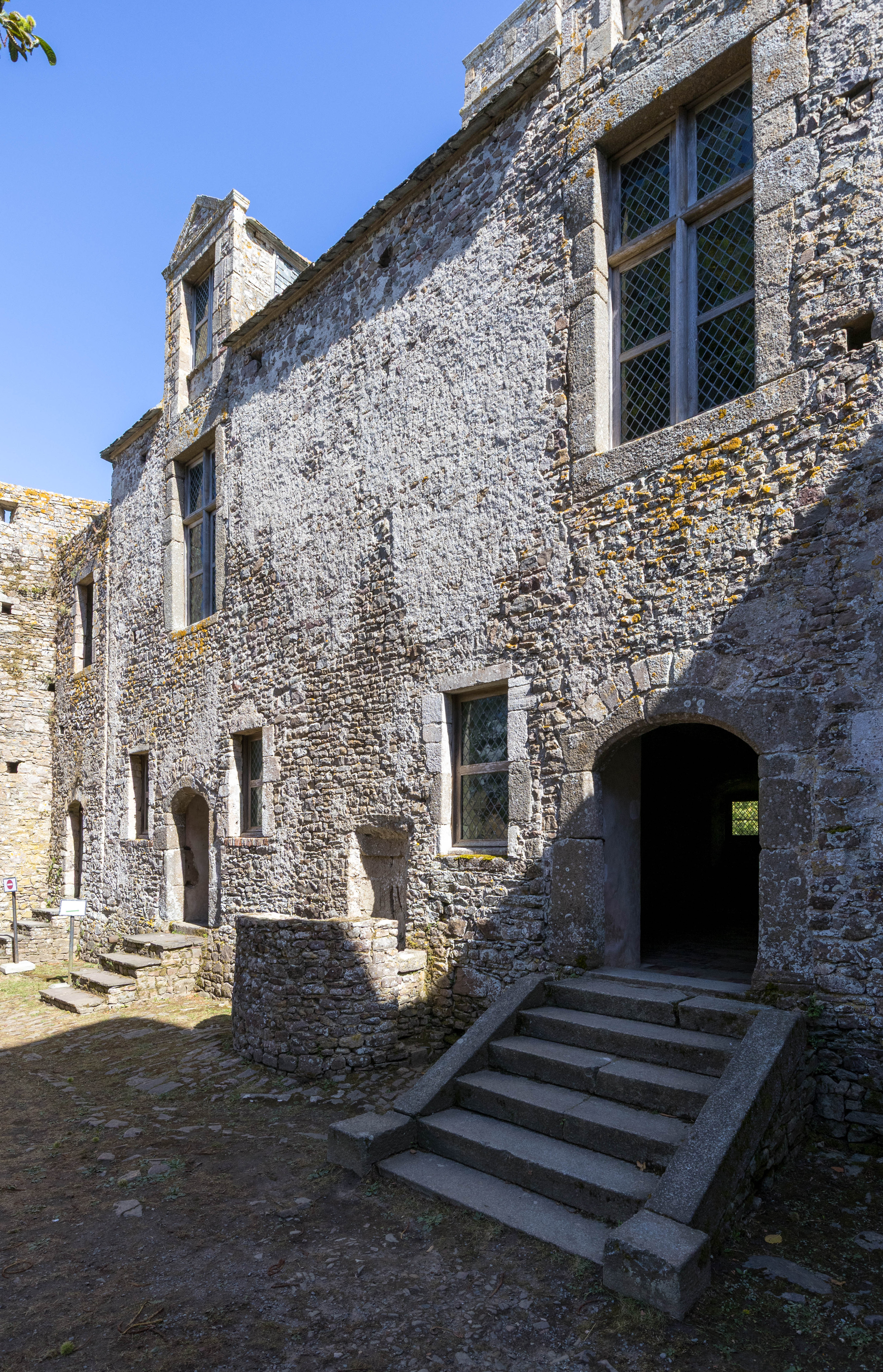
Lodgings inside keep

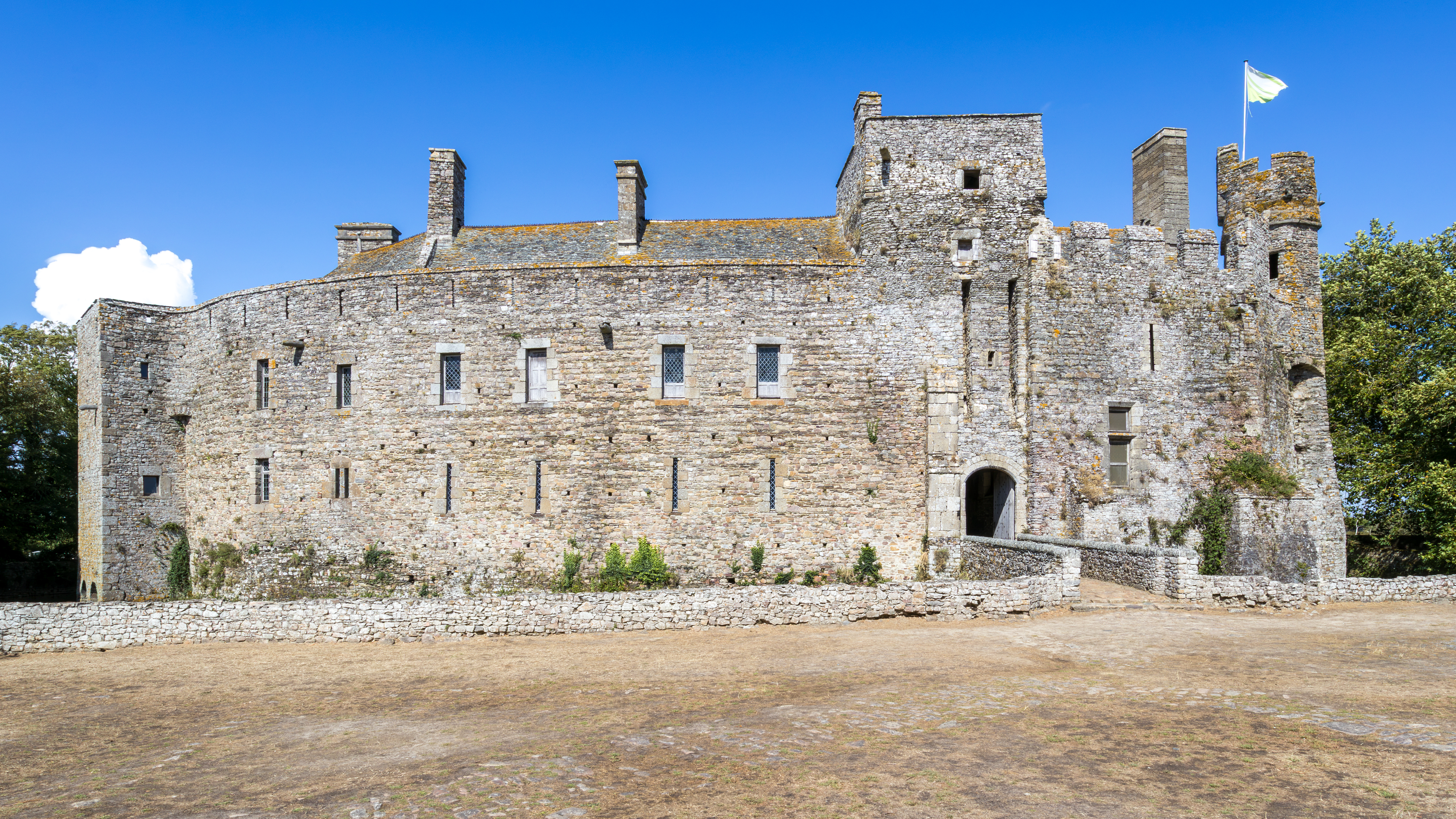
South façade.

== See also ==
- List of castles in France
- Manor house
- Detail of the legend, history with recent photographs
