= Saint-Germain-de-Livet =

- Commune
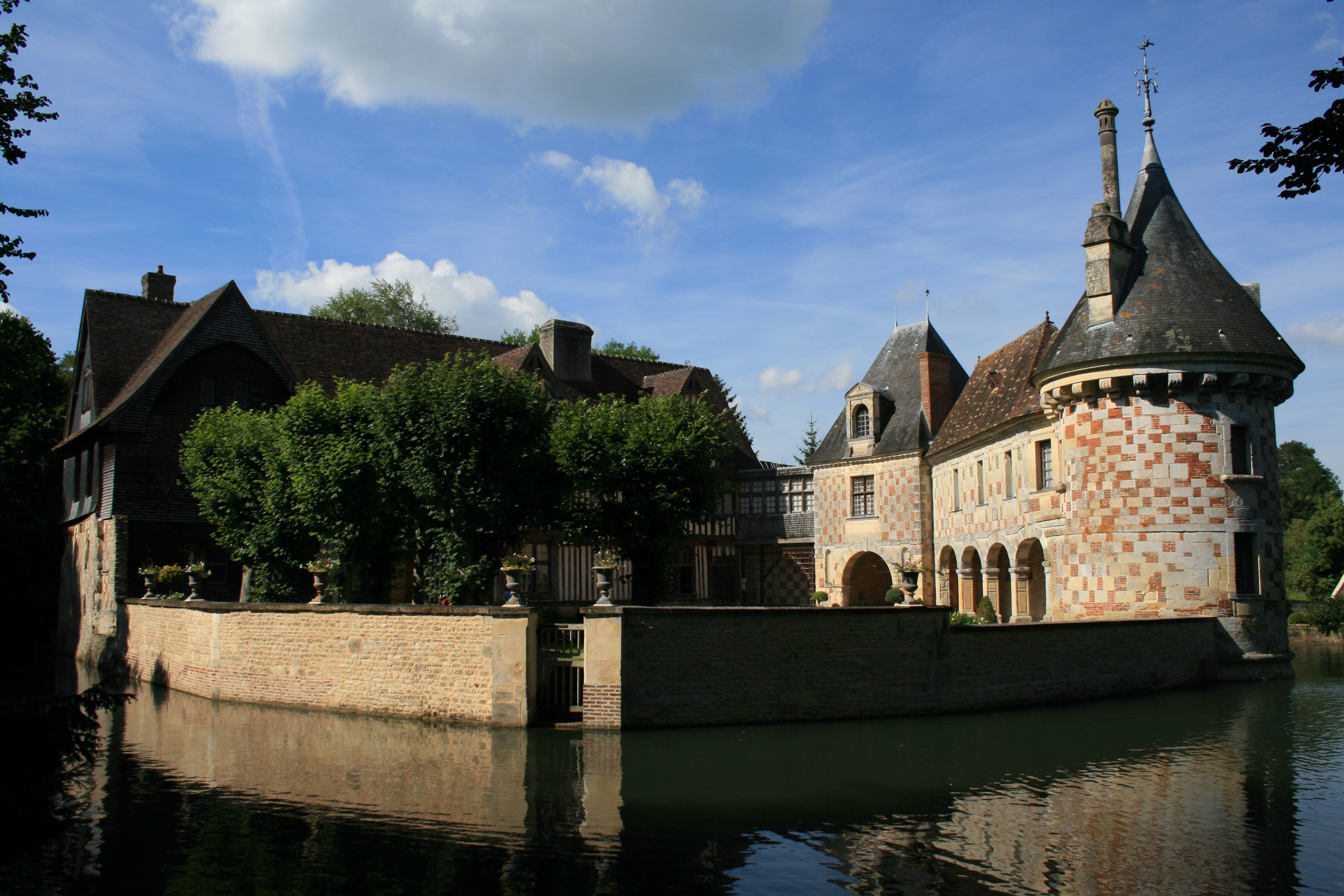
- Chateau St. Germain de Livet
- Location of Saint-Germain-de-Livet
- Location within France Location within Normandy
- Coordinates: 49°04′31″N 0°11′31″E
- Country: France
- Region: Normandy
- Department: Calvados
- Arrondissement: Lisieux
- Canton: Mézidon Vallée d'Auge
- Intercommunality: CA Lisieux Normandie

Government
  - Mayor (2020–2026): Jean-Louis Servy
- Area^{1}: 16.41 km^{2} (6.34 sq mi)
- Elevation: 164 m (538 ft)
- Highest elevation: 182 m (597 ft)
- Lowest elevation: 53 m (174 ft)
- Population (2023): 688
  - Density: 41.9/km^{2} (109/sq mi)
- Time zone: UTC+01:00 (CET)
  - Summer (DST): UTC+02:00 (CEST)
- INSEE/Postal code: 14582 /14100
- ^{1} French Land Register data, which excludes lakes, ponds, glaciers > 1 km^{2} (0.386 sq mi or 247 acres) and river estuaries.

Saint-Germain-de-Livet (French pronunciation: [sɛ̃ ʒɛʁmɛ̃ də livɛ]) is a commune south of Lisieux in the Calvados department in the Normandy region in northwestern France.

== History ==
The famous chateau at Saint-Germain-de-Livet, now open to the public, was built by the Tournebu (later Tournebu-de-Livet) family between 1561 and 1578.

== Population ==
Historical population
Year	Pop.	±% p.a.
1968	498	—
1975	589	+2.43%
1982	631	+0.99%
1990	598	−0.67%
1999	581	−0.32%
2007	811	+4.26%
2012	784	−0.67%
2017	769	−0.39%
2023	688	−1.84%
Source: INSEE

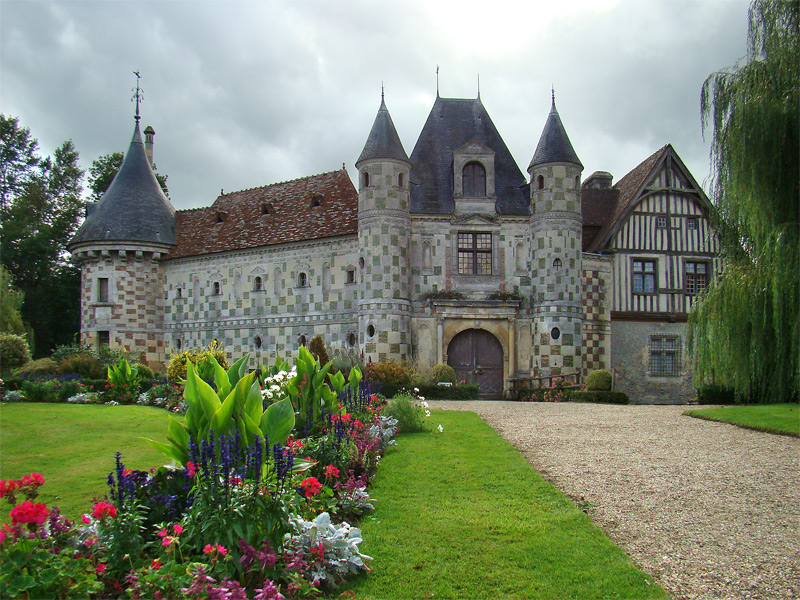
Chateau Saint-Germain-de-Livet

== See also ==
- Communes of the Calvados department
