= Pirou =

- Commune
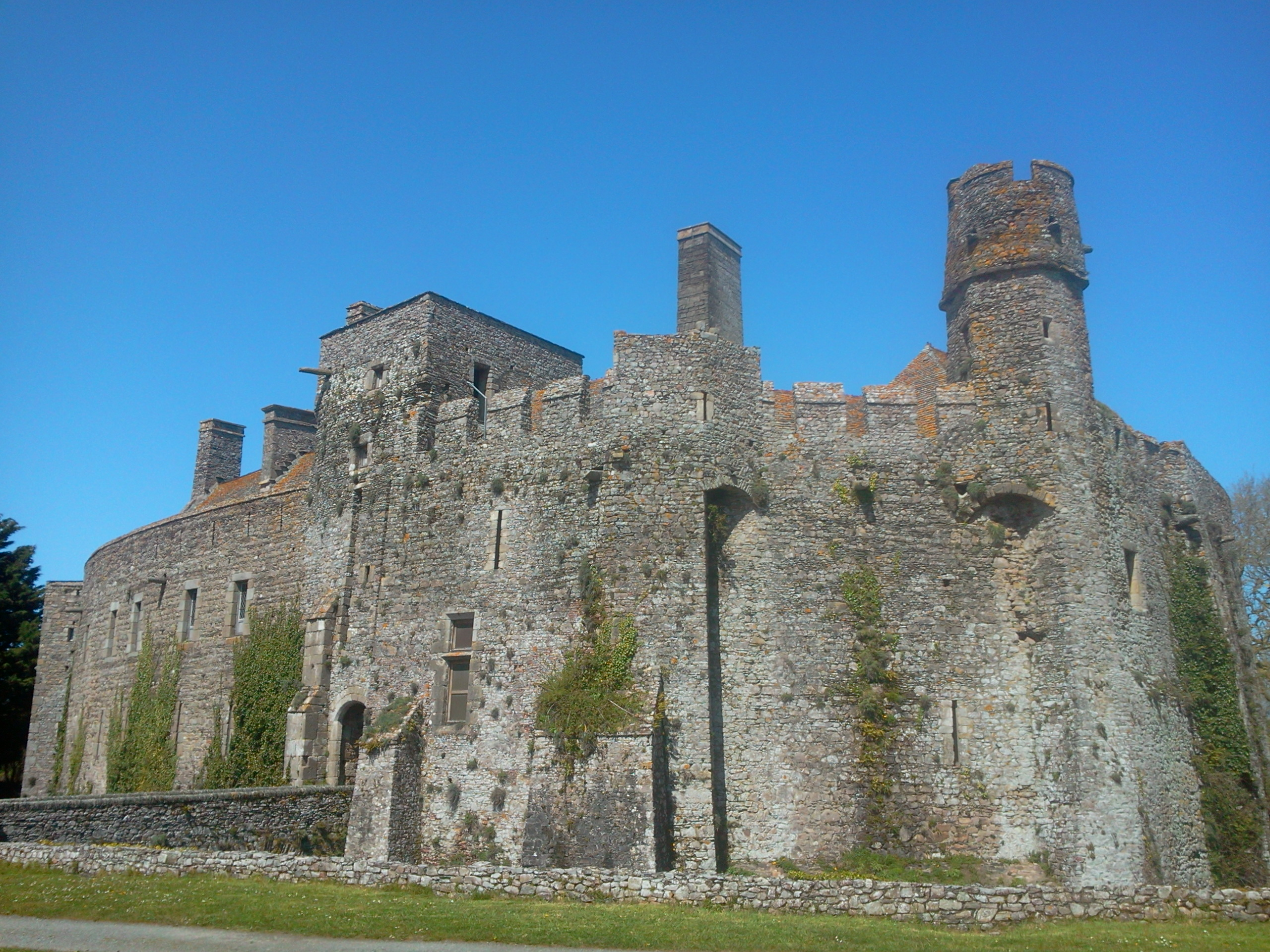
- The chateau

- Coat of arms
- Location of Pirou
- Location within France Location within Normandy
- Coordinates: 49°10′00″N 1°34′04″W
- Country: France
- Region: Normandy
- Department: Manche
- Arrondissement: Coutances
- Canton: Créances

Government
  - Mayor (2020–2026): Noëlle Leforestier
- Area^{1}: 29.11 km^{2} (11.24 sq mi)
- Elevation: 10 m (33 ft)
- Highest elevation: 40 m (130 ft)
- Lowest elevation: 0 m (0 ft)
- Population (2023): 1,514
  - Density: 52.01/km^{2} (134.7/sq mi)
- Time zone: UTC+01:00 (CET)
  - Summer (DST): UTC+02:00 (CEST)
- INSEE/Postal code: 50403 /50770
- ^{1} French Land Register data, which excludes lakes, ponds, glaciers > 1 km^{2} (0.386 sq mi or 247 acres) and river estuaries.

Pirou (French pronunciation: [piʁu]) is a commune in the Manche department in Normandy in north-western France. It is around 50 km south of Cherbourg and 90 km west of Caen. The inhabitants are called Pirouais.

== Heraldry ==
Arms of Pirou	The arms of Pirou are blazoned: Vert, a bend cotissed argent. These arms are borrowed from the de Pirou family (extinct), former lords of Pirou.

== See also ==
- Communes of the Manche department
- Château de Pirou
- Wild at art - photo log of the famous graffiti in the abandoned village
