= Château du Taillis =

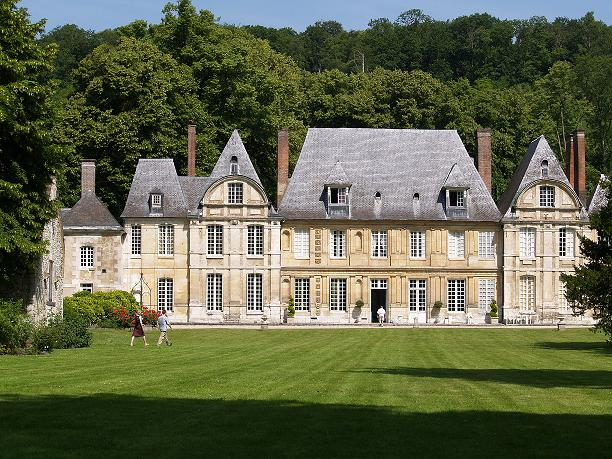
- Interactive map of the Château du Taillis area

General information
- Type: Château
- Location: Duclair, Seine-Maritime, Normandy, France
- Coordinates: 49°28′05″N 0°51′09″E
- Construction started: 1530
- Owner: Nicolas Navarro

Website
- www.chateaudutaillis.com/

Château du Taillis is located in the hamlet of Saint-Paul in Duclair in the Seine-Maritime department of France not far from the Seine. The castle was listed as a Monument historique on 19 April 1996.

== History ==
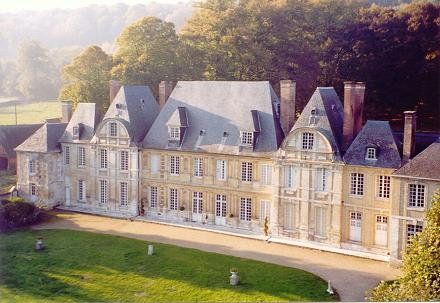
Aerial view

The château was built around 1530 by Jehan du Fay du Tailly on the foundations of a 13th-century fortified house. The unfinished central structure was enlarged with two pavilions in the 17th century and completed in the 18th century with the addition of new wings. The sculpted façade features seigniorial coats of arms, as well as niches and pilasters.

The castle has approximately 60 rooms with the theatre, the Chinese lounge featuring silk paintings used for private receptions, the entrance hall, the dining hall, and a music room all on the ground floor. The chapel, the Regency lounge and the 18th century bedrooms are located on the first floor.

The castle has been listed as a historic monument since 19 April 1996.

== The park ==
The park of the Château du Taillis has a number of remarkable and ancient trees such as giant Sequoia, Virginia tulip tree, and Atlas cedar. It also features flowerbeds and outbuildings such as the orangery, in the style of a Greco-Roman temple, or the stables built within a 16th-century chapel.

The restoration of the Guillot Pelletier greenhouse was one of the projects selected for the 2018 Heritage Loto. Today the château is owned by Nicolas Navarro, whose family acquired it in July 1998.

== Gallery ==
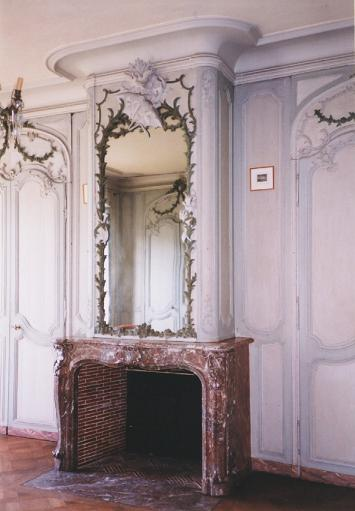
The marble fireplace

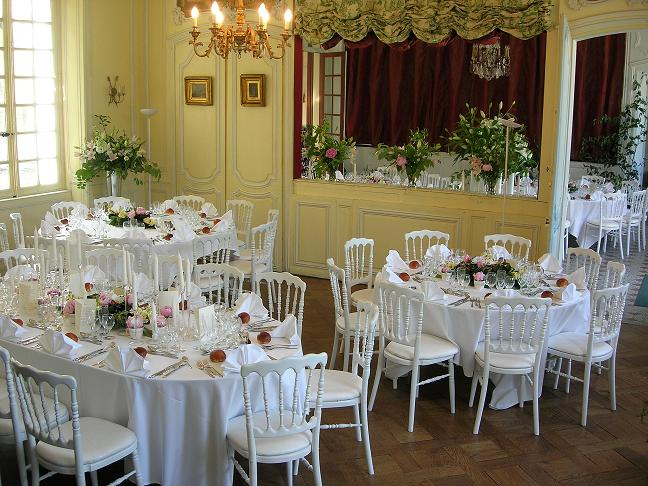
The hall

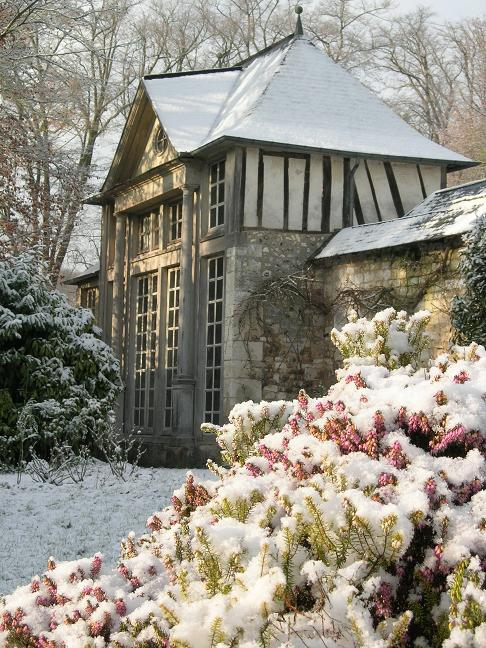
The orangery
