= Beuzeville-la-Bastille =

- Commune
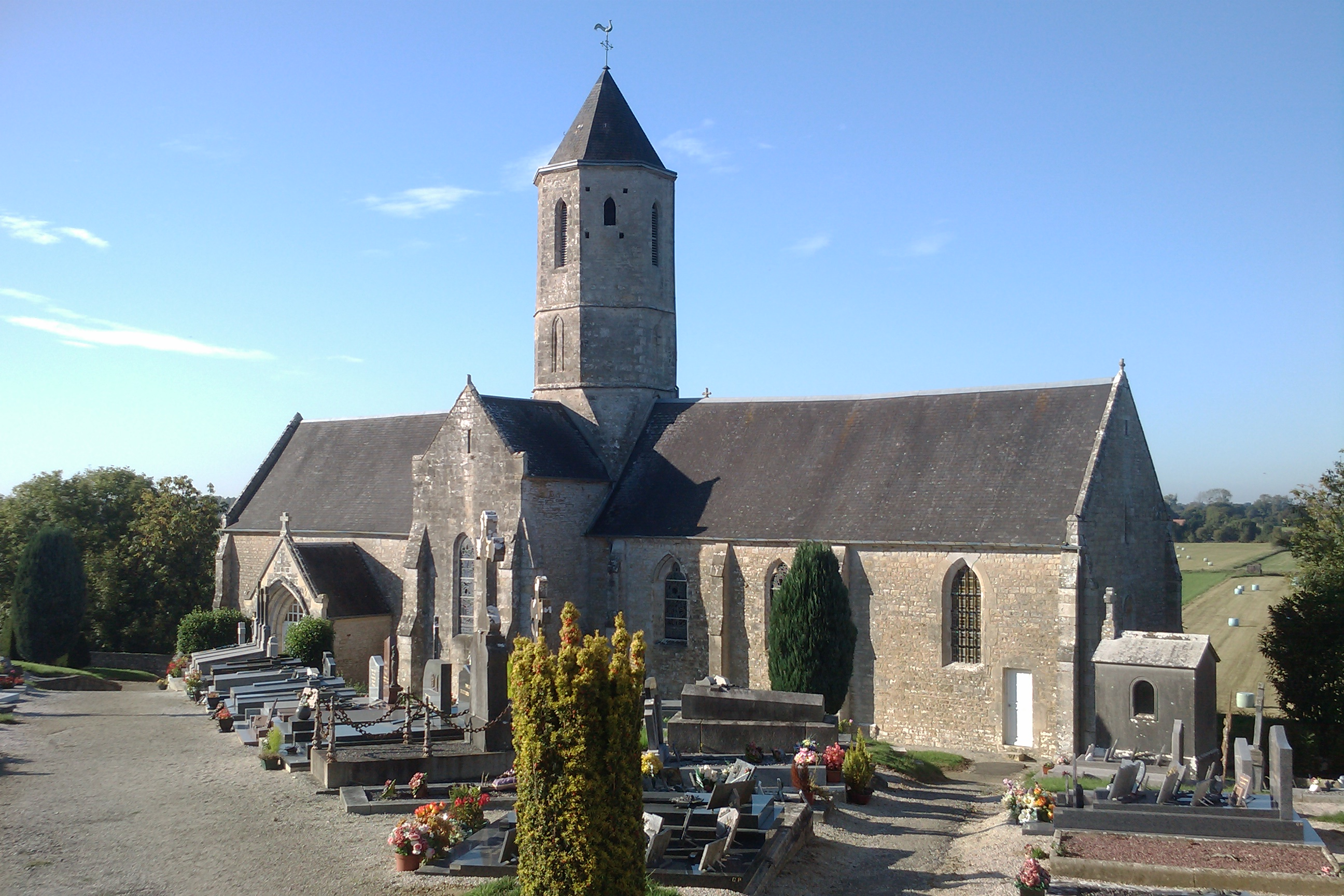
- The church of Saint-Vincent
- Location of Beuzeville-la-Bastille
- Location within France Location within Normandy
- Coordinates: 49°21′24″N 1°22′21″W
- Country: France
- Region: Normandy
- Department: Manche
- Arrondissement: Cherbourg
- Canton: Carentan-les-Marais
- Intercommunality: Baie du Cotentin

Government
  - Mayor (2020–2026): Carles Dupont
- Area^{1}: 4.34 km^{2} (1.68 sq mi)
- Elevation: 10 m (33 ft)
- Highest elevation: 37 m (121 ft)
- Lowest elevation: 2 m (6.6 ft)
- Population (2023): 148
  - Density: 34.1/km^{2} (88.3/sq mi)
- Time zone: UTC+01:00 (CET)
  - Summer (DST): UTC+02:00 (CEST)
- INSEE/Postal code: 50052 /50360
- ^{1} French Land Register data, which excludes lakes, ponds, glaciers > 1 km^{2} (0.386 sq mi or 247 acres) and river estuaries.

Beuzeville-la-Bastille (French pronunciation: [bøzvil la bastij]) is a commune in the Manche department in the Normandy region in northwestern France.

== Population ==
Historical population
Year	Pop.	±% p.a.
1968	243	—
1975	225	−1.09%
1982	166	−4.25%
1990	166	+0.00%
1999	161	−0.34%
2007	149	−0.96%
2012	161	+1.56%
2017	144	−2.21%
2023	148	+0.46%
Source: INSEE

== See also ==
- Communes of the Manche department
