= Bézu =

Bézu may refer to:

- Bézu-la-Forêt, a commune in Normandy, France.
- Bézu-le-Guéry, a commune in the Aisne, France.
- Bézu-Saint-Éloi, a commune in the Normandy, France.
- Bézu-Saint-Germain, a commune in Aisne, France.
- Épaux-Bézu, a commune in the Aisne, France.
- Saint-Just-et-le-Bézu, a commune in Aude, France.
