= Julia Voznesenskaya =

Russian writer

Julia Nikolayevna Voznesenskaya (Russian: Юлия Николаевна Вознесенская), also known as Julia Toropovskaya, maiden name, Okulova (14 September 1940, Saint-Petersburg – 20 February 2015, Berlin), was a Russian author of books with a Christian worldview.

== Biography ==
Her father was a military engineer. From 1945 to 1950, she and her family lived in East Berlin, where he was stationed. Both of her parents were atheists until their last years, when they converted to Orthodoxy. She later studied at the Leningrad State Institute of Theater, Music and Cinematography and was active in the underground art community. In 1964, she was arrested and served a term of forced labor.

Her first poems were published in 1966; some through official channels, but mostly through samizdat. She was baptized in 1973. Over the next few years, she was a regular participant in demonstrations and hunger strikes on behalf of her fellow creative artists. In 1976, she assisted in the creation of the samizdat literary journal Часы (Hours).

That same year, she was sentenced to five years of exile for Anti-Soviet Propaganda. After breaking exile to attend the trial of Yuly Rybakov, she was sentenced to two years of imprisonment. In 1980 she emigrated to Germany with her two sons, living first in Frankfurt-am-Main, then Munich, where she worked for Radio Liberty.

From 1996 to 1999 she lived in the Lesninsky Russian Orthodox Convent in Chauvincourt-Provemont, Normandy, France. From 2002 until her death on 20 February 2015 she lived in Berlin.

== Works ==
Her works include The Star Chernobyl, about three sisters involved in the Chernobyl disaster; and her first novel, The Women's Decameron, about ten pregnant women in a maternity ward who are quarantined for ten days and - inspired by The Decameron - decide to tell ten stories each day, about life in 1980s Russia. My Posthumous Adventures (Мои посмертные приключения) is a fictional story of what her heroine experiences after clinical death. She is a laureate of the prizes Orthodox Christian Book of Russia (Православная книга России) and Alye Parusa (Crimson Sails).

Her book series "The Yulianna" is sometimes classified as anti-Potter since it is a children's series that supports the Christian faith instead of witchcraft and magic. It tells the story of twin girls separated at birth and posits a Christian view of spiritual battle where angels and demons are real and prayer and Christian life or selfishness and giving in to temptation have real spiritual causes or results, and how prayer really can be 'magic'.

Probably her most popular book is the first of a two-part series, called "Cassandra's Path, or Adventures with Macaroni", a science fiction apocalyptic view from the Christian perspective of the last days, and of one woman's journey to faith. In “100 Days before the Flood,” there remain another hundred days before the flood arrives. The ark is ready, but no one believes the prophecies: Noah's neighbors laugh at him and build a money-making restaurant "Ark", enticing people to all sorts of earthly pleasures. Each of the characters has to make their own decision about where to direct their life and immortal soul: to the indulgence of the flesh or to the Kingdom of God.

The historical novel "The Miracle at Edes" explores the legend of three early Greek Christians named Simon, Gury, and Aviv (the patrons of marriage in Greece). Their tale revolves around the exciting and even dangerous adventures of a newly married couple, with a spectacular twist ending.

== Literary awards ==
"Best Author of the Year" in the contest "Orthodox Book of Russia" (2003)

Winner of the annual competition of works for children and youth "Scarlet Sails" in the nomination "Prose" - for the book "The Way of Cassandra".

== Selected bibliography ==
- The Women's Decameron / Женский декамерон. Tel Aviv (1987)
- The Star Chernobyl / Звезда Чернобыль. New York (1987)
- Lettres d'amour (French) (1990)
- My Posthumous Adventures / Мои посмертные приключения (2001)
- Cassandra's Path / Путь Кассандры (2002)
- The Pilgrimage of Lancelot /Паломничество Ланселота (2004)
- Julianna or A Kidnapping Game / Юлианна или Игра в киднеппинг (2004)
- Julianna or Dangerous Games / Юлианна или Опасные игры (2005)
- The Son of our Leader / Сын Вождя (2006)
- A Mermaid in the Swimming-Pool / Русалка в бассейне. (2007)
- Asti Spumante / Асти Спуманте. (2007)
- Julianna or A Game Between the Daughters and Their Mom / Юлианна или Игра в «Дочки-мачехи» (2007)
- There Lived an Old Woman ... / Жила-была старушка... (2008)
- Assuage My Sorrows and Other Stories / Утоли моя печали (сборник рассказов) (2009)
- Thank You for Your Love / Благодарю за любовь (2009)
- Unexpected Joy and Other Stories / Нечаянная радость и другие истории (2010)
- 100 Days before the Flood / Сто дней до потопа (2011)
- The Miracle at Edessa / Эдесское чудо (2012)
