= Arrondissement of Les Andelys =

Coordinates: 49.25°N 1.42°E

Les Andelys
- Arrondissement
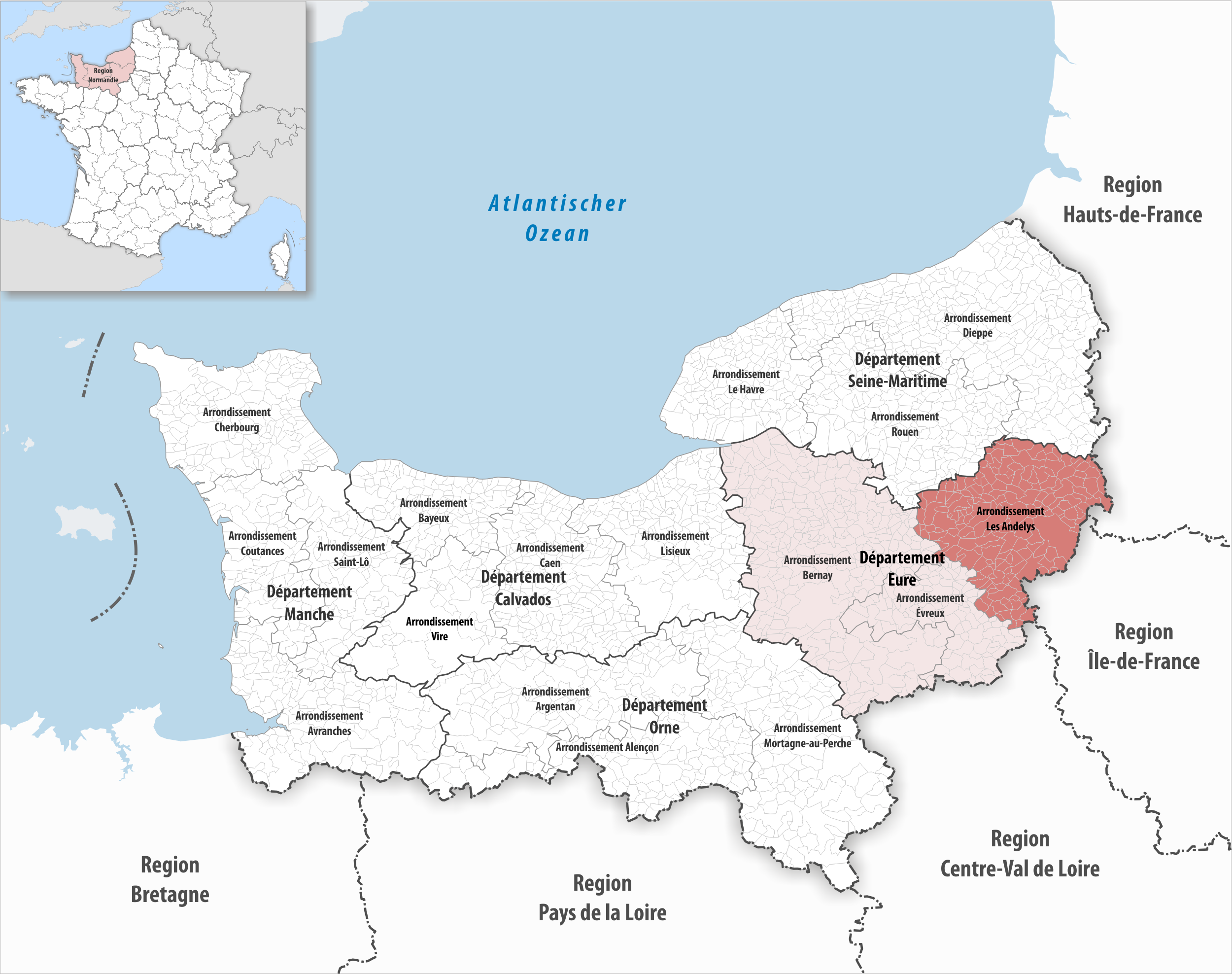
- Location within the region Normandy
- Country: France
- Region: Normandy
- Department: Eure
- No. of communes: {{{nbcomm}}}
- Area: 1,822.8 km^{2} (703.8 sq mi)
- Population (2023): 240,581
  - Density: 131.98/km^{2} (341.84/sq mi)
- INSEE code: 271

The arrondissement of Les Andelys is an arrondissement of France in the Eure department in the Normandy region. It has 185 communes. Its population is 235,024 (2021), and its area is 1,822.8 km^{2} (703.8 sq mi).

== Composition ==
The communes of the arrondissement of Les Andelys are:

1. Acquigny
2. Aigleville
3. Ailly
4. Alizay
5. Amécourt
6. Amfreville-les-Champs
7. Amfreville-sous-les-Monts
8. Amfreville-sur-Iton
9. Andé
10. Les Andelys
11. Autheuil-Authouillet
12. Authevernes
13. Bacqueville
14. Bazincourt-sur-Epte
15. Beauficel-en-Lyons
16. Bernouville
17. Bézu-la-Forêt
18. Bézu-Saint-Éloi
19. Bois-Jérôme-Saint-Ouen
20. Boisset-les-Prévanches
21. La Boissière
22. Bosquentin
23. Bouafles
24. Bouchevilliers
25. Bourg-Beaudouin
26. Breuilpont
27. Bueil
28. Caillouet-Orgeville
29. Cailly-sur-Eure
30. Chaignes
31. Chambray
32. Champenard
33. La Chapelle-Longueville
34. Charleval
35. Château-sur-Epte
36. Chauvincourt-Provemont
37. Clef-Vallée-d'Eure
38. Connelles
39. Le Cormier
40. Coudray
41. Courcelles-sur-Seine
42. Crasville
43. Criquebeuf-sur-Seine
44. Croisy-sur-Eure
45. Cuverville
46. Les Damps
47. Dangu
48. Daubeuf-près-Vatteville
49. Douains
50. Doudeauville-en-Vexin
51. Douville-sur-Andelle
52. Écouis
53. Étrépagny
54. Fains
55. Farceaux
56. Fleury-la-Forêt
57. Fleury-sur-Andelle
58. Flipou
59. Fontaine-Bellenger
60. Fontaine-sous-Jouy
61. Frenelles-en-Vexin
62. Gadencourt
63. Gaillon
64. Gamaches-en-Vexin
65. Gasny
66. Gisors
67. Giverny
68. Guerny
69. Guiseniers
70. Hacqueville
71. Hardencourt-Cocherel
72. Harquency
73. La Haye-le-Comte
74. La Haye-Malherbe
75. Hébécourt
76. Hécourt
77. Hennezis
78. Herqueville
79. Heubécourt-Haricourt
80. Heudebouville
81. Heudicourt
82. Heudreville-sur-Eure
83. La Heunière
84. Heuqueville
85. Les Hogues
86. Houlbec-Cocherel
87. Houville-en-Vexin
88. Igoville
89. Incarville
90. Jouy-sur-Eure
91. Léry
92. Letteguives
93. Lilly
94. Lisors
95. Longchamps
96. Lorleau
97. Louviers
98. Lyons-la-Forêt
99. Mainneville
100. Le Manoir
101. Martagny
102. Martot
103. Ménesqueville
104. Ménilles
105. Mercey
106. Merey
107. Le Mesnil-Jourdain
108. Mesnil-sous-Vienne
109. Mesnil-Verclives
110. Mézières-en-Vexin
111. Morgny
112. Mouflaines
113. Muids
114. Neaufles-Saint-Martin
115. Neuilly
116. La Neuve-Grange
117. Nojeon-en-Vexin
118. Notre-Dame-de-l'Isle
119. Noyers
120. Pacy-sur-Eure
121. Perriers-sur-Andelle
122. Perruel
123. Pinterville
124. Pîtres
125. Le Plessis-Hébert
126. Pont-de-l'Arche
127. Pont-Saint-Pierre
128. Porte-de-Seine
129. Port-Mort
130. Poses
131. Pressagny-l'Orgueilleux
132. Puchay
133. Quatremare
134. Radepont
135. Renneville
136. Richeville
137. Romilly-sur-Andelle
138. La Roquette
139. Rosay-sur-Lieure
140. Rouvray
141. Saint-Aubin-sur-Gaillon
142. Saint-Denis-le-Ferment
143. Sainte-Colombe-près-Vernon
144. Sainte-Geneviève-lès-Gasny
145. Sainte-Marie-de-Vatimesnil
146. Saint-Étienne-du-Vauvray
147. Saint-Étienne-sous-Bailleul
148. Saint-Julien-de-la-Liègue
149. Saint-Marcel
150. Saint-Pierre-de-Bailleul
151. Saint-Pierre-du-Vauvray
152. Saint-Pierre-la-Garenne
153. Saint-Vincent-des-Bois
154. Sancourt
155. Saussay-la-Campagne
156. Surtauville
157. Surville
158. Suzay
159. Terres de Bord
160. Le Thil
161. Les Thilliers-en-Vexin
162. Le Thuit
163. Tilly
164. Touffreville
165. Les Trois Lacs
166. Le Tronquay
167. La Vacherie
168. Val-de-Reuil
169. Le Val-d'Hazey
170. Val d'Orger
171. Vandrimare
172. Vascœuil
173. Vatteville
174. Le Vaudreuil
175. Vaux-sur-Eure
176. Vernon
177. Vesly
178. Vexin-sur-Epte
179. Vézillon
180. Villegats
181. Villers-en-Vexin
182. Villers-sur-le-Roule
183. Villez-sous-Bailleul
184. Villiers-en-Désœuvre
185. Vironvay

== History ==
The arrondissement of Les Andelys was created in 1800. It was expanded in 2006 with the two cantons of Louviers-Nord and Louviers-Sud from the arrondissement of Évreux. At the January 2017 reorganisation of the arrondissements of Eure, it gained 35 communes from the arrondissement of Évreux, and it lost one commune to the arrondissement of Bernay.

As a result of the reorganisation of the cantons of France which came into effect in 2015, the borders of the cantons are no longer related to the borders of the arrondissements. The cantons of the arrondissement of Les Andelys were, as of January 2015:

1. Les Andelys
2. Écos
3. Étrépagny
4. Fleury-sur-Andelle
5. Gaillon
6. Gaillon-Campagne
7. Gisors
8. Louviers-Nord
9. Louviers-Sud
10. Lyons-la-Forêt
11. Pont-de-l'Arche
12. Val-de-Reuil
