= Sancourt =

Sancourt may refer to the following communes in France:

- Sancourt, Eure, in the Eure département
- Sancourt, Nord, in the Nord département
- Sancourt, Somme, in the Somme département
