= Sainte-Geneviève-lès-Gasny =

- Commune
- Coat of arms
- Location of Sainte-Geneviève-lès-Gasny
- Location within France Location within Normandy
- Coordinates: 49°05′03″N 1°35′08″E
- Country: France
- Region: Normandy
- Department: Eure
- Arrondissement: Les Andelys
- Canton: Vernon
- Intercommunality: Seine Normandie Agglomération

Government
  - Mayor (2020–2026): Héléna Martinez
- Area^{1}: 4.17 km^{2} (1.61 sq mi)
- Elevation: 27 m (89 ft)
- Highest elevation: 132 m (433 ft)
- Lowest elevation: 14 m (46 ft)
- Population (2023): 648
  - Density: 155/km^{2} (402/sq mi)
- Time zone: UTC+01:00 (CET)
  - Summer (DST): UTC+02:00 (CEST)
- INSEE/Postal code: 27540 /27620
- ^{1} French Land Register data, which excludes lakes, ponds, glaciers > 1 km^{2} (0.386 sq mi or 247 acres) and river estuaries.

Sainte-Geneviève-lès-Gasny (French pronunciation: [sɛ̃t ʒənvjɛv lɛ ɡani], lit. 'Sainte-Geneviève near Gasny') is a commune in the Eure department in Normandy in northern France.

== Geography ==
Sainte-Geneviève-lès-Gasny lies on the Epte river and borders the Yvelines department. It is bordered by the communes of Bois-Jérôme-Saint-Ouen to the north, Gasny to the north and east, Gommecourt to the southeast, Limetz-Villez to the south and southwest, and Giverny to the west.

== Population ==
Historical population
Year	Pop.	±% p.a.
1968	184	—
1975	298	+7.13%
1982	387	+3.80%
1990	732	+8.29%
1999	698	−0.53%
2007	631	−1.25%
2012	670	+1.21%
2017	663	−0.21%
2023	648	−0.38%
Source: INSEE

== See also ==
- Communes of the Eure department
