= Doudeauville =

Doudeauville may refer to several communes in France:

- Doudeauville, Pas-de-Calais
- Doudeauville, Seine-Maritime
- Doudeauville-en-Vexin, in the Eure département
