= Richeville =

- Commune
- Location of Richeville
- Location within France Location within Normandy
- Coordinates: 49°16′06″N 1°32′07″E
- Country: France
- Region: Normandy
- Department: Eure
- Arrondissement: Les Andelys
- Canton: Gisors

Government
  - Mayor (2020–2026): Roland Dubos
- Area^{1}: 3.92 km^{2} (1.51 sq mi)
- Elevation: 147 m (482 ft)
- Highest elevation: 150 m (490 ft)
- Lowest elevation: 78 m (256 ft)
- Population (2023): 264
  - Density: 67.3/km^{2} (174/sq mi)
- Time zone: UTC+01:00 (CET)
  - Summer (DST): UTC+02:00 (CEST)
- INSEE/Postal code: 27490 /27420
- ^{1} French Land Register data, which excludes lakes, ponds, glaciers > 1 km^{2} (0.386 sq mi or 247 acres) and river estuaries.

Richeville (French pronunciation: [ʁiʃvil]) is a commune in the Eure department in north western France.

== Population ==
Historical population
Year	Pop.	±% p.a.
1968	165	—
1975	145	−1.83%
1982	137	−0.81%
1990	215	+5.79%
1999	263	+2.26%
2007	280	+0.79%
2012	278	−0.14%
2017	272	−0.44%
2023	264	−0.50%
Source: INSEE

== See also ==
- Communes of the Eure department
