= Étrépagny =

Commune in Normandy, France

- Commune
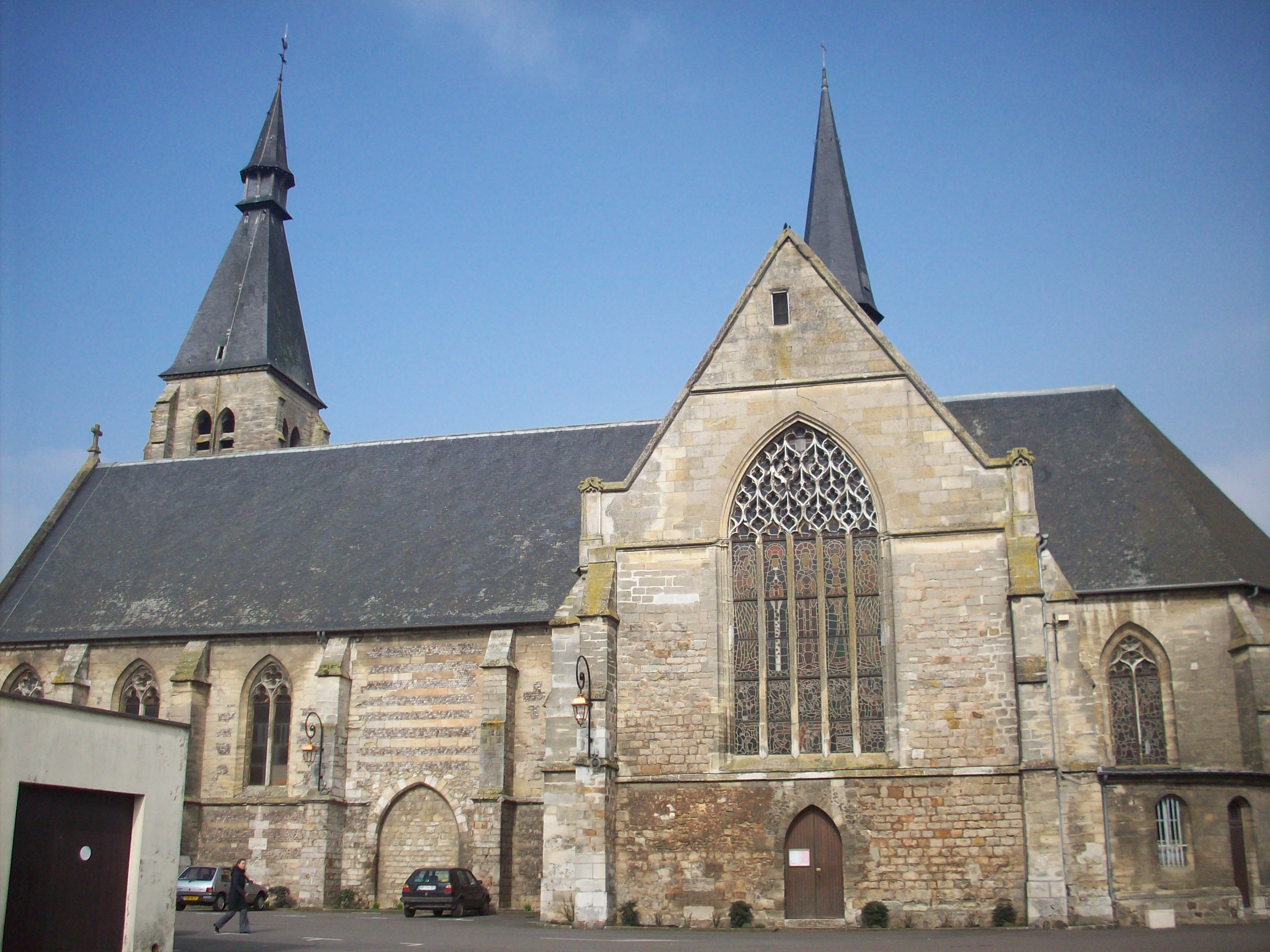
- The church in Étrépagny

- Coat of arms
- Location of Étrépagny
- Location within France Location within Normandy
- Coordinates: 49°18′24″N 1°36′44″E
- Country: France
- Region: Normandy
- Department: Eure
- Arrondissement: Les Andelys
- Canton: Gisors

Government
  - Mayor (2020–2026): Frédéric Cailliet
- Area^{1}: 20.38 km^{2} (7.87 sq mi)
- Elevation: 104 m (341 ft)
- Highest elevation: 134 m (440 ft)
- Lowest elevation: 74 m (243 ft)
- Population (2023): 3,670
  - Density: 180/km^{2} (466/sq mi)
- Time zone: UTC+01:00 (CET)
  - Summer (DST): UTC+02:00 (CEST)
- INSEE/Postal code: 27226 /27150
- ^{1} French Land Register data, which excludes lakes, ponds, glaciers > 1 km^{2} (0.386 sq mi or 247 acres) and river estuaries.

Étrépagny (French pronunciation: [etʁepaɲi]) is a commune in the Eure department in the Normandy region in northern France.

== Population ==
Historical population
Year	Pop.	±% p.a.
1968	2,637	—
1975	3,074	+2.21%
1982	3,151	+0.35%
1990	3,671	+1.93%
1999	3,553	−0.36%
2007	3,560	+0.02%
2012	3,885	+1.76%
2017	3,764	−0.63%
2023	3,670	−0.42%
Source: INSEE

== International relations ==
Since 1989, the town has been twinned with the Irish town of Trim which has a significant Norman heritage.

== See also ==
- Communes of the Eure department
