= Nojeon-en-Vexin =

- Commune
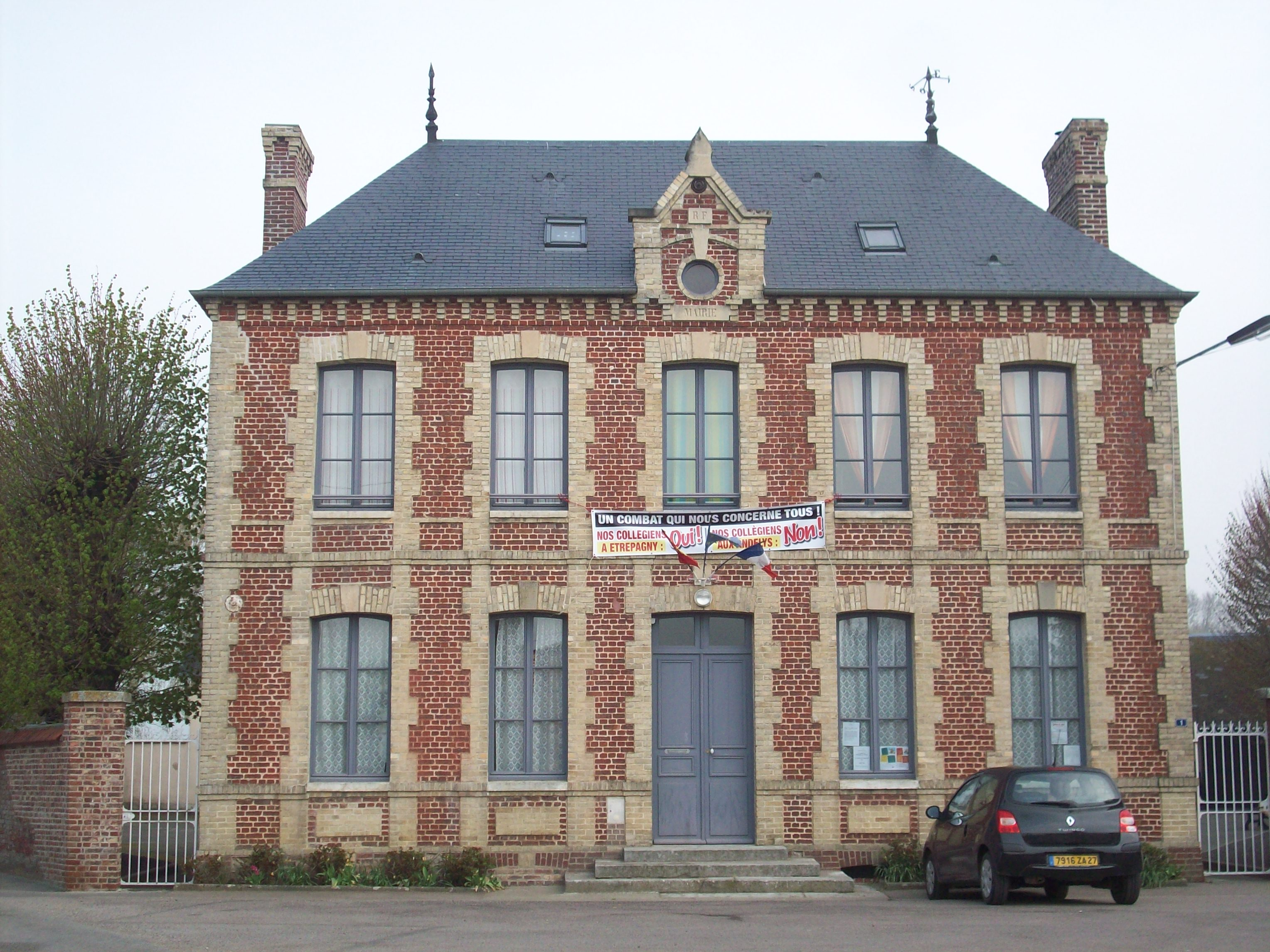
- The town hall in Nojeon-en-Vexin
- Location of Nojeon-en-Vexin
- Location within France Location within Normandy
- Coordinates: 49°19′49″N 1°33′55″E
- Country: France
- Region: Normandy
- Department: Eure
- Arrondissement: Les Andelys
- Canton: Gisors

Government
  - Mayor (2023–2026): Céline Dubret
- Area^{1}: 13.02 km^{2} (5.03 sq mi)
- Elevation: 110 m (360 ft)
- Highest elevation: 144 m (472 ft)
- Lowest elevation: 88 m (289 ft)
- Population (2023): 352
  - Density: 27.0/km^{2} (70.0/sq mi)
- Time zone: UTC+01:00 (CET)
  - Summer (DST): UTC+02:00 (CEST)
- INSEE/Postal code: 27437 /27150
- ^{1} French Land Register data, which excludes lakes, ponds, glaciers > 1 km^{2} (0.386 sq mi or 247 acres) and river estuaries.

Nojeon-en-Vexin (French pronunciation: [nɔʒɔ̃ ɑ̃ vɛksɛ̃], literally Nojeon in Vexin) is a commune in the Eure department in Normandy in northern France.

== Population ==
Historical population
Year	Pop.	±% p.a.
1968	250	—
1975	232	−1.06%
1982	225	−0.44%
1990	205	−1.16%
1999	240	+1.77%
2007	319	+3.62%
2012	319	+0.00%
2017	339	+1.22%
2023	352	+0.63%
Source: INSEE

== See also ==
- Communes of the Eure department
