= Farceaux =

- Commune
- Location of Farceaux
- Location within France Location within Normandy
- Coordinates: 49°17′24″N 1°31′11″E
- Country: France
- Region: Normandy
- Department: Eure
- Arrondissement: Les Andelys
- Canton: Gisors

Government
  - Mayor (2020–2026): Benoit Rihal
- Area^{1}: 7.56 km^{2} (2.92 sq mi)
- Elevation: 143 m (469 ft)
- Highest elevation: 150 m (490 ft)
- Lowest elevation: 107 m (351 ft)
- Population (2023): 343
  - Density: 45.4/km^{2} (118/sq mi)
- Time zone: UTC+01:00 (CET)
  - Summer (DST): UTC+02:00 (CEST)
- INSEE/Postal code: 27232 /27150
- ^{1} French Land Register data, which excludes lakes, ponds, glaciers > 1 km^{2} (0.386 sq mi or 247 acres) and river estuaries.

Farceaux (French pronunciation: [faʁso]) is a commune in the Eure department in the Normandy region in northern France.

== Population ==
Historical population
Year	Pop.	±% p.a.
1968	181	—
1975	152	−2.46%
1982	144	−0.77%
1990	185	+3.18%
1999	275	+4.50%
2007	284	+0.40%
2012	321	+2.48%
2017	344	+1.39%
2023	343	−0.05%
Source: INSEE

== See also ==
- Communes of the Eure department
