= Authevernes =

- Commune
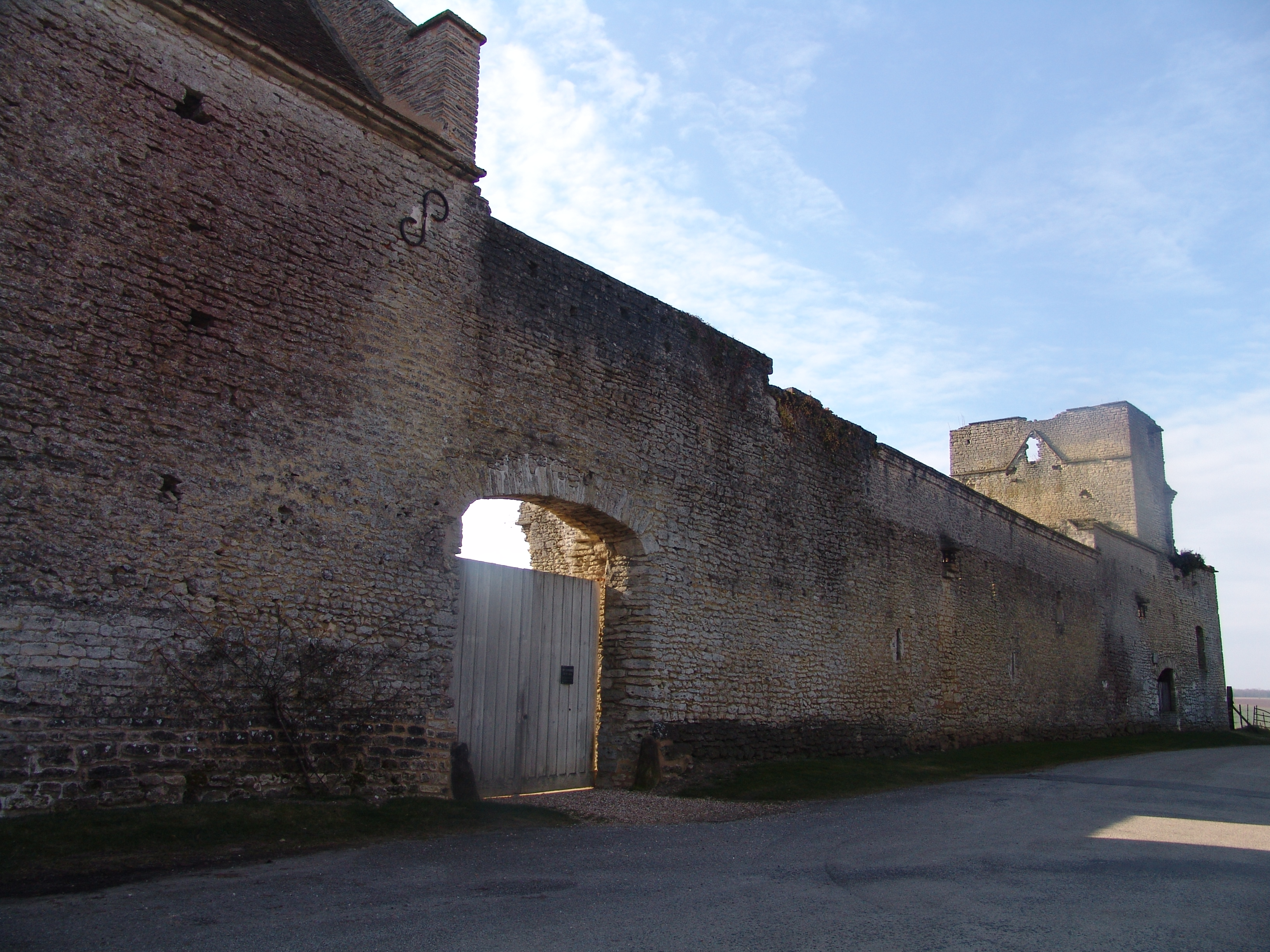
- Fort

- Coat of arms
- Location of Authevernes
- Location within France Location within Normandy
- Coordinates: 49°13′09″N 1°38′25″E
- Country: France
- Region: Normandy
- Department: Eure
- Arrondissement: Les Andelys
- Canton: Gisors
- Intercommunality: CC Vexin Normand

Government
  - Mayor (2020–2026): James Blouin
- Area^{1}: 8.15 km^{2} (3.15 sq mi)
- Elevation: 140 m (460 ft)
- Highest elevation: 148 m (486 ft)
- Lowest elevation: 68 m (223 ft)
- Population (2023): 470
  - Density: 58/km^{2} (150/sq mi)
- Time zone: UTC+01:00 (CET)
  - Summer (DST): UTC+02:00 (CEST)
- INSEE/Postal code: 27026 /27420
- ^{1} French Land Register data, which excludes lakes, ponds, glaciers > 1 km^{2} (0.386 sq mi or 247 acres) and river estuaries.

Authevernes (French pronunciation: [otvɛʁn]) is a commune in the Eure department in Normandy in northern France.

== Population ==
Historical population
Year	Pop.	±% p.a.
1968	180	—
1975	202	+1.66%
1982	225	+1.55%
1990	273	+2.45%
1999	361	+3.15%
2007	415	+1.76%
2012	366	−2.48%
2017	400	+1.79%
2023	470	+2.72%
Source: INSEE

== See also ==
- Communes of the Eure department
