= Amécourt =

- Commune
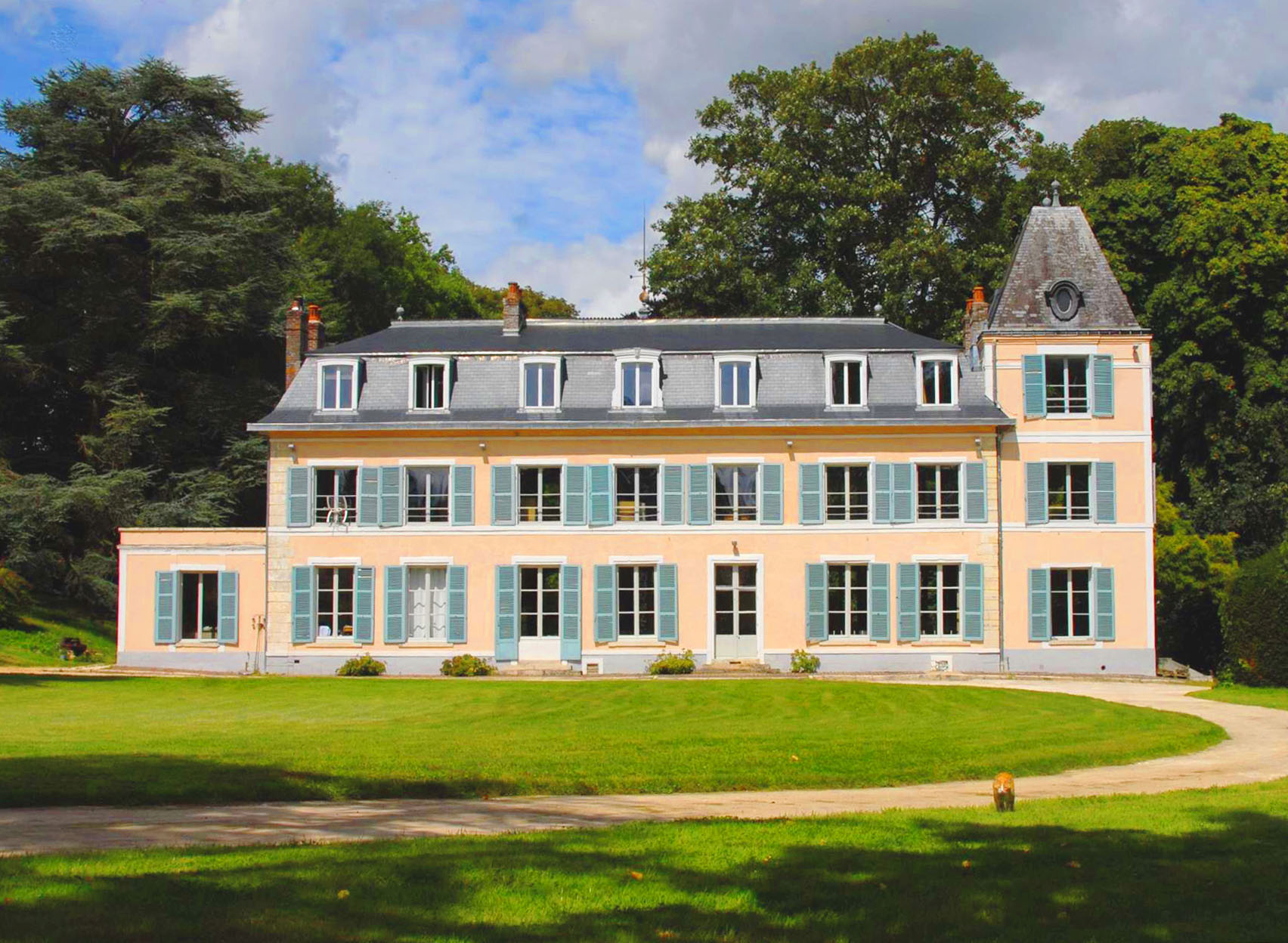
- The chateau in Amécourt

- Coat of arms
- Location of Amécourt
- Location within France Location within Normandy
- Coordinates: 49°22′50″N 1°44′07″E
- Country: France
- Region: Normandy
- Department: Eure
- Arrondissement: Les Andelys
- Canton: Gisors
- Intercommunality: Vexin Normand

Government
  - Mayor (2021–2026): Jérôme Vrel
- Area^{1}: 6.01 km^{2} (2.32 sq mi)
- Elevation: 78 m (256 ft)
- Highest elevation: 166 m (545 ft)
- Lowest elevation: 67 m (220 ft)
- Population (2023): 172
  - Density: 28.6/km^{2} (74.1/sq mi)
- Time zone: UTC+01:00 (CET)
  - Summer (DST): UTC+02:00 (CEST)
- INSEE/Postal code: 27010 /27140
- ^{1} French Land Register data, which excludes lakes, ponds, glaciers > 1 km^{2} (0.386 sq mi or 247 acres) and river estuaries.

Amécourt (French pronunciation: [amekuʁ]) is a commune in the Eure department and Normandy region of France.

== Population ==
Historical population
Year	Pop.	±% p.a.
1968	105	—
1975	87	−2.65%
1982	111	+3.54%
1990	106	−0.57%
1999	145	+3.54%
2007	171	+2.08%
2012	177	+0.69%
2017	162	−1.76%
2023	172	+1.00%
Source: INSEE

== See also ==
- Communes of the Eure department
