= Saint-Denis-le-Ferment =

- Commune
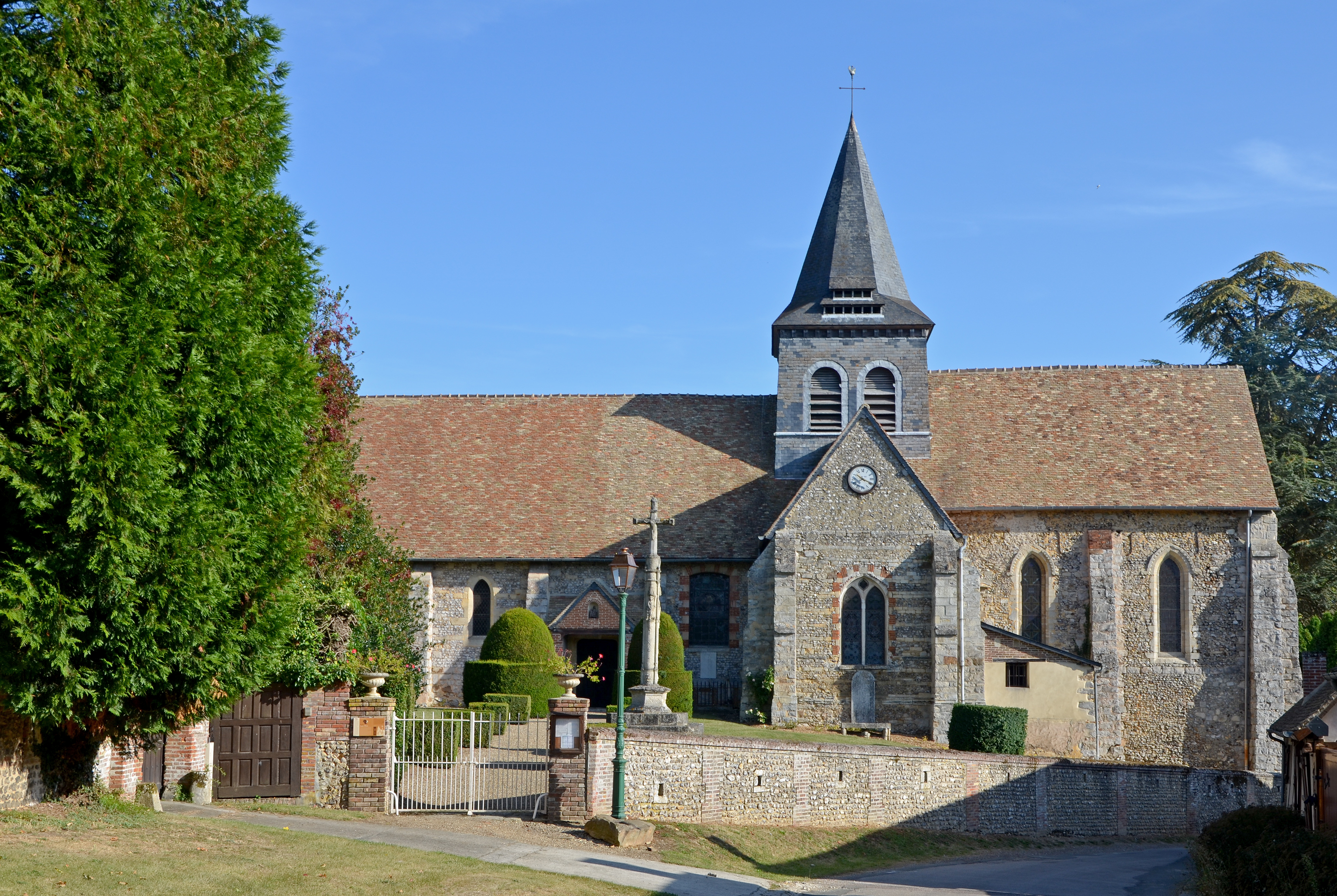
- The church in Saint-Denis-le-Ferment

- Coat of arms
- Location of Saint-Denis-le-Ferment
- Location within France Location within Normandy
- Coordinates: 49°19′47″N 1°43′10″E
- Country: France
- Region: Normandy
- Department: Eure
- Arrondissement: Les Andelys
- Canton: Gisors

Government
  - Mayor (2020–2026): Nathalie Thébault
- Area^{1}: 18.01 km^{2} (6.95 sq mi)
- Elevation: 105 m (344 ft)
- Highest elevation: 137 m (449 ft)
- Lowest elevation: 54 m (177 ft)
- Population (2023): 495
  - Density: 27.5/km^{2} (71.2/sq mi)
- Time zone: UTC+01:00 (CET)
  - Summer (DST): UTC+02:00 (CEST)
- INSEE/Postal code: 27533 /27140
- ^{1} French Land Register data, which excludes lakes, ponds, glaciers > 1 km^{2} (0.386 sq mi or 247 acres) and river estuaries.

Saint-Denis-le-Ferment (French pronunciation: [sɛ̃ dəni lə fɛʁmɑ̃]) is a commune in the Eure department in Normandy in northern France.

== Population ==
Historical population
Year	Pop.	±% p.a.
1968	238	—
1975	214	−1.51%
1982	298	+4.84%
1990	405	+3.91%
1999	456	+1.33%
2007	470	+0.38%
2012	509	+1.61%
2017	488	−0.84%
2023	495	+0.24%
Source: INSEE

== See also ==
- Communes of the Eure department
