= La Neuve-Grange =

- Commune
- Location of La Neuve-Grange
- Location within France Location within Normandy
- Coordinates: 49°21′49″N 1°33′18″E
- Country: France
- Region: Normandy
- Department: Eure
- Arrondissement: Les Andelys
- Canton: Gisors

Government
  - Mayor (2020–2026): Didier Pinel
- Area^{1}: 5.09 km^{2} (1.97 sq mi)
- Elevation: 145 m (476 ft)
- Highest elevation: 156 m (512 ft)
- Lowest elevation: 128 m (420 ft)
- Population (2023): 389
  - Density: 76.4/km^{2} (198/sq mi)
- Time zone: UTC+01:00 (CET)
  - Summer (DST): UTC+02:00 (CEST)
- INSEE/Postal code: 27430 /27150
- ^{1} French Land Register data, which excludes lakes, ponds, glaciers > 1 km^{2} (0.386 sq mi or 247 acres) and river estuaries.

La Neuve-Grange (French pronunciation: [la nœv ɡʁɑ̃ʒ]) is a commune in the Eure department in Normandy in northern France.

== Population ==
Historical population
Year	Pop.	±% p.a.
1968	159	—
1975	154	−0.46%
1982	159	+0.46%
1990	177	+1.35%
1999	192	+0.91%
2007	299	+5.69%
2012	343	+2.78%
2017	330	−0.77%
2023	389	+2.78%
Source: INSEE

== See also ==
- Communes of the Eure department
