= Georges Baptiste François Allix =

Military engineer in the French Navy (1808–1881)

- Born: 27 July 1808; Gasny, Eure, France
- Died: May 29, 1881 (aged 72); Gasny, Eure, France
- Spouse: Marie-Louise Rosalie Marinel
- Children: Louis Georges Allix
- Engineering career
- Discipline: Naval military engineering
- Institutions: École Polytechnique; École d'application du Génie maritime
- Employer: French Navy
- Significant design: Yacht-aviso Comte d'Eu; Impératrice Eugénie class: Frigates Impétueuse and Souveraine.
- Awards: Officer of the Legion of Honour

Georges Baptiste François Allix (27 July 1808 in Gasny – 29 May 1881 in the same commune) was a military engineer in the French Navy. In particular, he was the designer of the screw frigate La Souveraine, launched in Lorient on 3 June 1856.

== Biography ==
He entered the École polytechnique in November 1827 became a pupil of the École d'application du Génie maritime on 9 November 1829, then a admitted pupil on 1 January 1831. Rising through the ranks of engineer, he was appointed engineer 1st class on 27 September 1852. In 1836, he built the Cigale and the Belette.

In 1846, he designed the hull of the yacht-aviso Comte d'Eu, intended for King Louis-Philippe. This steamer was launched at the shipyards of Augustin Normand (known as the Normand shipyards), father of Jacques-Augustin Normand (fr), on 20 December 1846.

In 1852 a program for a number of first rate frigates was started. The Impératrice Eugénie class of 5 ships was built according to a design by Dupuy de Lôme: : the Ardente, the Audacieuse, the Foudre, the Impératrice Eugénie, the Impétueuse and the Souveraine.

Based on the project, Allix drew up the plans for the last two, which were approved on 21 November 1853: the Impétueuse was launched on 15 August 1856 in Cherbourg and the Souveraine was launched on 3 June 1856 in Lorient. On average these ships displaced 3,800 t and reached 12 kn on trials.

Allix was a member of the “Conseil des travaux de la Marine” from July 1853 to June 1854, knight then officer of the Legion of Honour on 12 August 1862. On 1 January 1860, he was a member of the “Commission supérieure pour le perfectionnement de l'École navale impériale” (Higher Commission for the Further Training of the Imperial Naval School) instituted by the order of 17 May 1854, under the chairmanship of Rear Admiral Pierre Louis Aimé Mathieu (fr). On 1 January 1869, he was a member of the “Commission d'examen des mécaniciens” (Mechanics' Examination Commission).

== Personal life ==
He married Marie-Louise Rosalie Marinel and was the father of Louis Georges Allix, polytechnicien engineering officer, born in Paris on 12 February 1862.

== Distinctions ==
- Officer of the Legion of Honour (2 August 1862)

== Works ==
- Allix, Georges Jean Baptiste François (1840). Explication d'un nouveau système de tarifs, ou Nouvelle méthode pour trouver, en mesures métriques, sans aucun calcul, le poids des métaux en barres ou en feuilles, le cube des bois bruts ou équarris, le cube des pierres de taille (in French). Paris: Bachelier.
