= Puchay =

- Commune
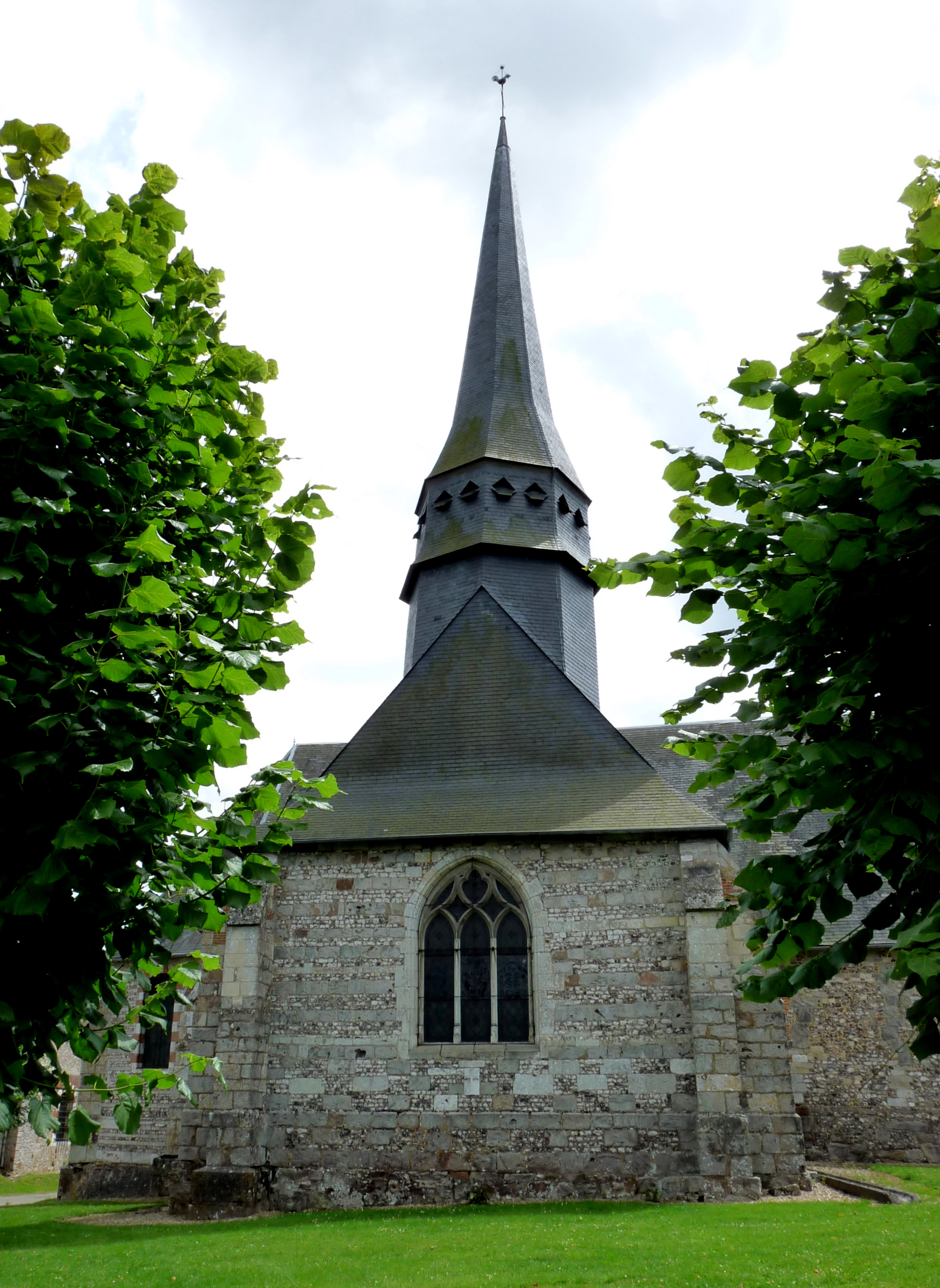
- The church in Puchay
- Location of Puchay
- Location within France Location within Normandy
- Coordinates: 49°20′36″N 1°32′02″E
- Country: France
- Region: Normandy
- Department: Eure
- Arrondissement: Les Andelys
- Canton: Gisors

Government
  - Mayor (2020–2026): Thierry Mabyre
- Area^{1}: 13.93 km^{2} (5.38 sq mi)
- Elevation: 142 m (466 ft)
- Highest elevation: 177 m (581 ft)
- Lowest elevation: 93 m (305 ft)
- Population (2023): 605
  - Density: 43.4/km^{2} (112/sq mi)
- Time zone: UTC+01:00 (CET)
  - Summer (DST): UTC+02:00 (CEST)
- INSEE/Postal code: 27480 /27150
- ^{1} French Land Register data, which excludes lakes, ponds, glaciers > 1 km^{2} (0.386 sq mi or 247 acres) and river estuaries.

Puchay (French pronunciation: [pyʃɛ]) is a commune in the Eure department in Normandy in northern France.

== Population ==
Historical population
Year	Pop.	±% p.a.
1968	383	—
1975	405	+0.80%
1982	451	+1.55%
1990	380	−2.12%
1999	407	+0.77%
2007	541	+3.62%
2012	572	+1.12%
2017	626	+1.82%
2023	605	−0.57%
Source: INSEE

== See also ==
- Communes of the Eure department
