= Mouflaines =

- Commune
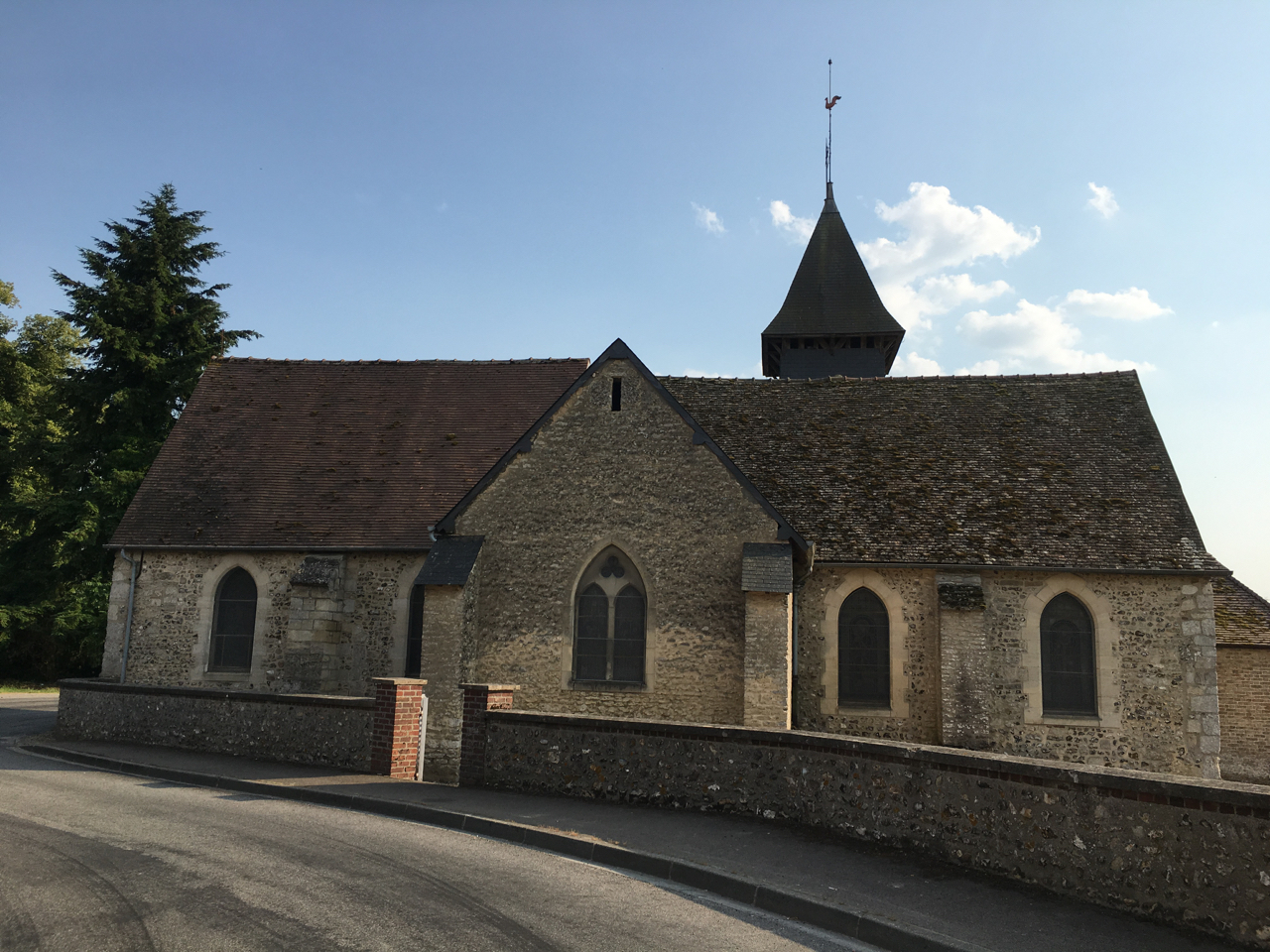
- The church in Mouflaines
- Location of Mouflaines
- Location within France Location within Normandy
- Coordinates: 49°14′49″N 1°33′22″E
- Country: France
- Region: Normandy
- Department: Eure
- Arrondissement: Les Andelys
- Canton: Gisors

Government
  - Mayor (2020–2026): Frédéric Villette
- Area^{1}: 3.75 km^{2} (1.45 sq mi)
- Elevation: 116 m (381 ft)
- Highest elevation: 137 m (449 ft)
- Lowest elevation: 74 m (243 ft)
- Population (2023): 159
  - Density: 42.4/km^{2} (110/sq mi)
- Time zone: UTC+01:00 (CET)
  - Summer (DST): UTC+02:00 (CEST)
- INSEE/Postal code: 27420 /27420
- ^{1} French Land Register data, which excludes lakes, ponds, glaciers > 1 km^{2} (0.386 sq mi or 247 acres) and river estuaries.

Mouflaines (French pronunciation: [muflɛn]) is a commune in the Eure department in Normandy in northern France.

== Population ==
Historical population
Year	Pop.	±% p.a.
1968	160	—
1975	161	+0.09%
1982	144	−1.58%
1990	115	−2.77%
1999	112	−0.29%
2007	147	+3.46%
2012	165	+2.34%
2017	167	+0.24%
2023	159	−0.81%
Source: INSEE

== See also ==
- Communes of the Eure department
