= Le Thil =

- Commune
- Coat of arms
- Location of Le Thil
- Location within France Location within Normandy
- Coordinates: 49°18′43″N 1°33′25″E
- Country: France
- Region: Normandy
- Department: Eure
- Arrondissement: Les Andelys
- Canton: Gisors
- Intercommunality: Vexin Normand

Government
  - Mayor (2020–2026): Frédéric Muller
- Area^{1}: 4.24 km^{2} (1.64 sq mi)
- Elevation: 114 m (374 ft)
- Highest elevation: 122 m (400 ft)
- Lowest elevation: 94 m (308 ft)
- Population (2023): 586
  - Density: 138/km^{2} (358/sq mi)
- Time zone: UTC+01:00 (CET)
  - Summer (DST): UTC+02:00 (CEST)
- INSEE/Postal code: 27632 /27150
- ^{1} French Land Register data, which excludes lakes, ponds, glaciers > 1 km^{2} (0.386 sq mi or 247 acres) and river estuaries.

Le Thil (also known as Le Thil-en-Vexin) is a commune in the Eure department in Normandy in northern France.

== Population ==
Historical population
Year	Pop.	±% p.a.
1968	294	—
1975	246	−2.51%
1982	215	−1.91%
1990	199	−0.96%
1999	308	+4.97%
2007	394	+3.13%
2012	460	+3.15%
2017	539	+3.22%
2023	586	+1.40%
Source: INSEE

== See also ==
- Communes of the Eure department
