= Les Thilliers-en-Vexin =

- Commune
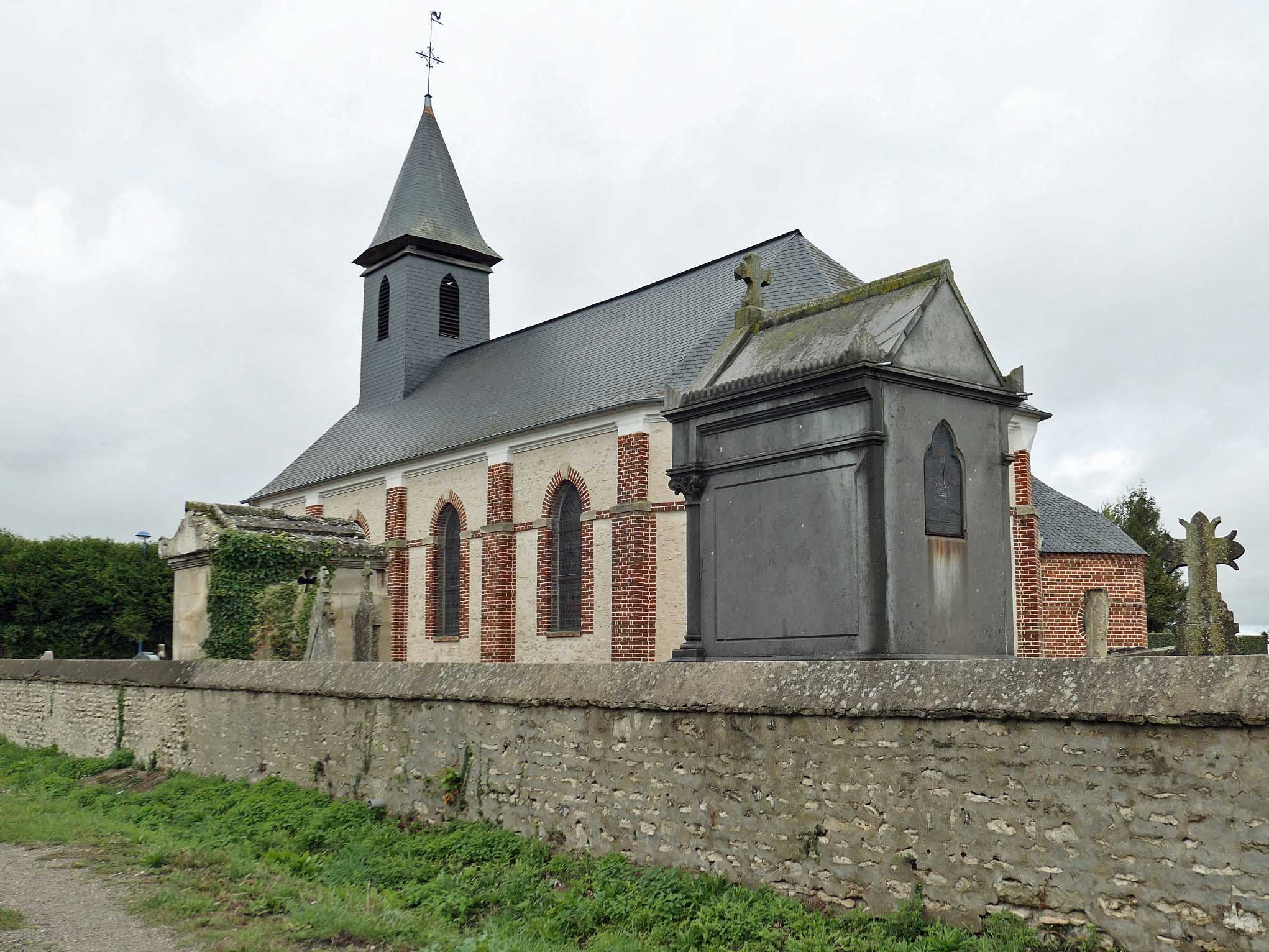
- Location of Les Thilliers-en-Vexin
- Location within France Location within Normandy
- Coordinates: 49°14′14″N 1°36′36″E
- Country: France
- Region: Normandy
- Department: Eure
- Arrondissement: Les Andelys
- Canton: Gisors

Government
  - Mayor (2020–2026): Paul Gaillard
- Area^{1}: 1.57 km^{2} (0.61 sq mi)
- Elevation: 127 m (417 ft)
- Highest elevation: 132 m (433 ft)
- Lowest elevation: 115 m (377 ft)
- Population (2023): 491
  - Density: 313/km^{2} (810/sq mi)
- Time zone: UTC+01:00 (CET)
  - Summer (DST): UTC+02:00 (CEST)
- INSEE/Postal code: 27633 /27420
- ^{1} French Land Register data, which excludes lakes, ponds, glaciers > 1 km^{2} (0.386 sq mi or 247 acres) and river estuaries.

Les Thilliers-en-Vexin is a commune in the Eure department in Normandy in northern France.

== Population ==
Historical population
Year	Pop.	±% p.a.
1968	328	—
1975	393	+2.62%
1982	403	+0.36%
1990	403	+0.00%
1999	496	+2.33%
2007	467	−0.75%
2012	468	+0.04%
2017	494	+1.09%
2023	491	−0.10%
Source: INSEE

== See also ==
- Communes of the Eure department
