= Noyers, Eure =

Noyers
- Commune
- Coat of arms
- Location of Noyers
- Location within France Location within Normandy
- Coordinates: 49°14′45″N 1°40′49″E
- Country: France
- Region: Normandy
- Department: Eure
- Arrondissement: Les Andelys
- Canton: Gisors

Government
  - Mayor (2020–2026): Nathalie Boudin
- Area^{1}: 5.37 km^{2} (2.07 sq mi)
- Elevation: 43 m (141 ft)
- Highest elevation: 141 m (463 ft)
- Lowest elevation: 53 m (174 ft)
- Population (2023): 257
  - Density: 47.9/km^{2} (124/sq mi)
- Time zone: UTC+01:00 (CET)
  - Summer (DST): UTC+02:00 (CEST)
- INSEE/Postal code: 27445 /27720
- ^{1} French Land Register data, which excludes lakes, ponds, glaciers > 1 km^{2} (0.386 sq mi or 247 acres) and river estuaries.

Noyers (French pronunciation: [nwaje]) is a commune in the Eure department in Normandy in northern France.

== Population ==
Historical population
| Year | Pop. | ±% p.a. |
|---|---|---|
| 1968 | 201 | — |
| 1975 | 178 | −1.72% |
| 1982 | 212 | +2.53% |
| 1990 | 193 | −1.17% |
| 1999 | 223 | +1.62% |
| 2007 | 289 | +3.29% |
| 2012 | 278 | −0.77% |
| 2017 | 264 | −1.03% |
| 2023 | 257 | −0.45% |
Source: INSEE

== See also ==
- Communes of the Eure department
