= Saussay-la-Campagne =

- Commune
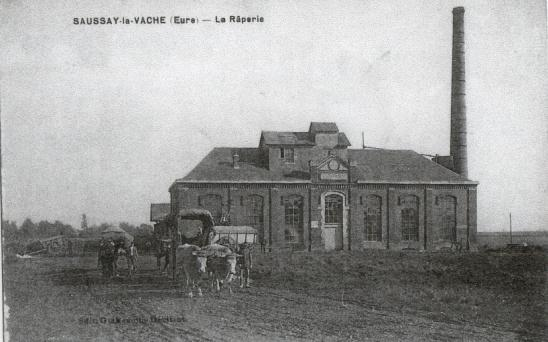
- The mill in Saussay

- Coat of arms
- Location of Saussay-la-Campagne
- Location within France Location within Normandy
- Coordinates: 49°19′01″N 1°30′49″E
- Country: France
- Region: Normandy
- Department: Eure
- Arrondissement: Les Andelys
- Canton: Gisors

Government
  - Mayor (2023–2026): Philippe Girod
- Area^{1}: 5 km^{2} (1.9 sq mi)
- Elevation: 125 m (410 ft)
- Highest elevation: 134 m (440 ft)
- Lowest elevation: 108 m (354 ft)
- Population (2023): 528
  - Density: 110/km^{2} (270/sq mi)
- Time zone: UTC+01:00 (CET)
  - Summer (DST): UTC+02:00 (CEST)
- INSEE/Postal code: 27617 /27150
- ^{1} French Land Register data, which excludes lakes, ponds, glaciers > 1 km^{2} (0.386 sq mi or 247 acres) and river estuaries.

Saussay-la-Campagne (French pronunciation: [sosɛ la kɑ̃paɲ]) is a commune in the Eure department in Normandy in northern France.

== Population ==
Historical population
Year	Pop.	±% p.a.
1968	344	—
1975	302	−1.84%
1982	332	+1.36%
1990	390	+2.03%
1999	423	+0.91%
2007	426	+0.09%
2012	476	+2.24%
2017	531	+2.21%
2023	528	−0.09%
Source: INSEE

== See also ==
- Communes of the Eure department
