= Hébécourt, Eure =

Hébécourt
- Commune
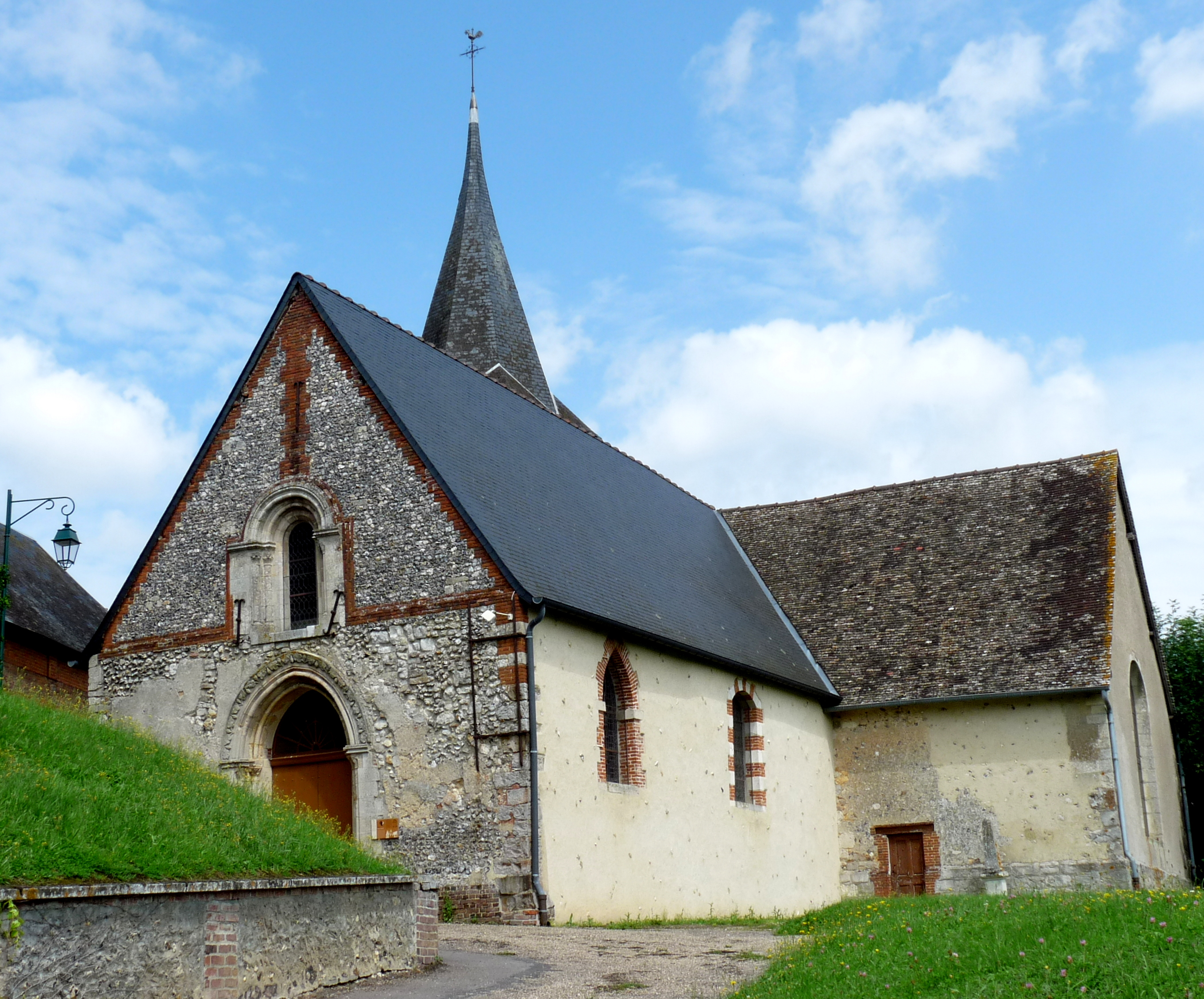
- The church of Saint-Laurent in Hébécourt

- Coat of arms
- Location of Hébécourt
- Location within France Location within Normandy
- Coordinates: 49°21′13″N 1°43′39″E
- Country: France
- Region: Normandy
- Department: Eure
- Arrondissement: Les Andelys
- Canton: Gisors

Government
  - Mayor (2020–2026): François Letierce
- Area^{1}: 11.24 km^{2} (4.34 sq mi)
- Elevation: 124 m (407 ft)
- Highest elevation: 155 m (509 ft)
- Lowest elevation: 66 m (217 ft)
- Population (2023): 628
  - Density: 55.9/km^{2} (145/sq mi)
- Time zone: UTC+01:00 (CET)
  - Summer (DST): UTC+02:00 (CEST)
- INSEE/Postal code: 27324 /27150
- ^{1} French Land Register data, which excludes lakes, ponds, glaciers > 1 km^{2} (0.386 sq mi or 247 acres) and river estuaries.

Hébécourt (French pronunciation: [ebekuʁ]) is a commune in the Eure department and Normandy region of France.

== Population ==
Historical population
| Year | Pop. | ±% p.a. |
|---|---|---|
| 1968 | 281 | — |
| 1975 | 280 | −0.05% |
| 1982 | 351 | +3.28% |
| 1990 | 448 | +3.10% |
| 1999 | 500 | +1.23% |
| 2007 | 565 | +1.54% |
| 2012 | 593 | +0.97% |
| 2017 | 586 | −0.24% |
| 2023 | 628 | +1.16% |
Source: INSEE

== See also ==
- Communes of the Eure department
