= Villers-en-Vexin =

- Commune
- Location of Villers-en-Vexin
- Location within France Location within Normandy
- Coordinates: 49°15′04″N 1°35′22″E
- Country: France
- Region: Normandy
- Department: Eure
- Arrondissement: Les Andelys
- Canton: Gisors

Government
  - Mayor (2020–2026): Christophe Seigné
- Area^{1}: 6.29 km^{2} (2.43 sq mi)
- Elevation: 145 m (476 ft)
- Highest elevation: 134 m (440 ft)
- Lowest elevation: 104 m (341 ft)
- Population (2023): 311
  - Density: 49.4/km^{2} (128/sq mi)
- Time zone: UTC+01:00 (CET)
  - Summer (DST): UTC+02:00 (CEST)
- INSEE/Postal code: 27690 /27420
- ^{1} French Land Register data, which excludes lakes, ponds, glaciers > 1 km^{2} (0.386 sq mi or 247 acres) and river estuaries.

Villers-en-Vexin (French pronunciation: [vilɛʁ ɑ̃ vɛksɛ̃], literally Villers in Vexin) is a commune in the Eure department in Normandy in northern France.

== Population ==
Historical population
Year	Pop.	±% p.a.
1968	287	—
1975	264	−1.19%
1982	248	−0.89%
1990	274	+1.25%
1999	286	+0.48%
2007	276	−0.44%
2012	292	+1.13%
2017	318	+1.72%
2023	311	−0.37%
Source: INSEE

== See also ==
- Communes of the Eure department
