= Dangu, Eure =

Dangu
- Commune
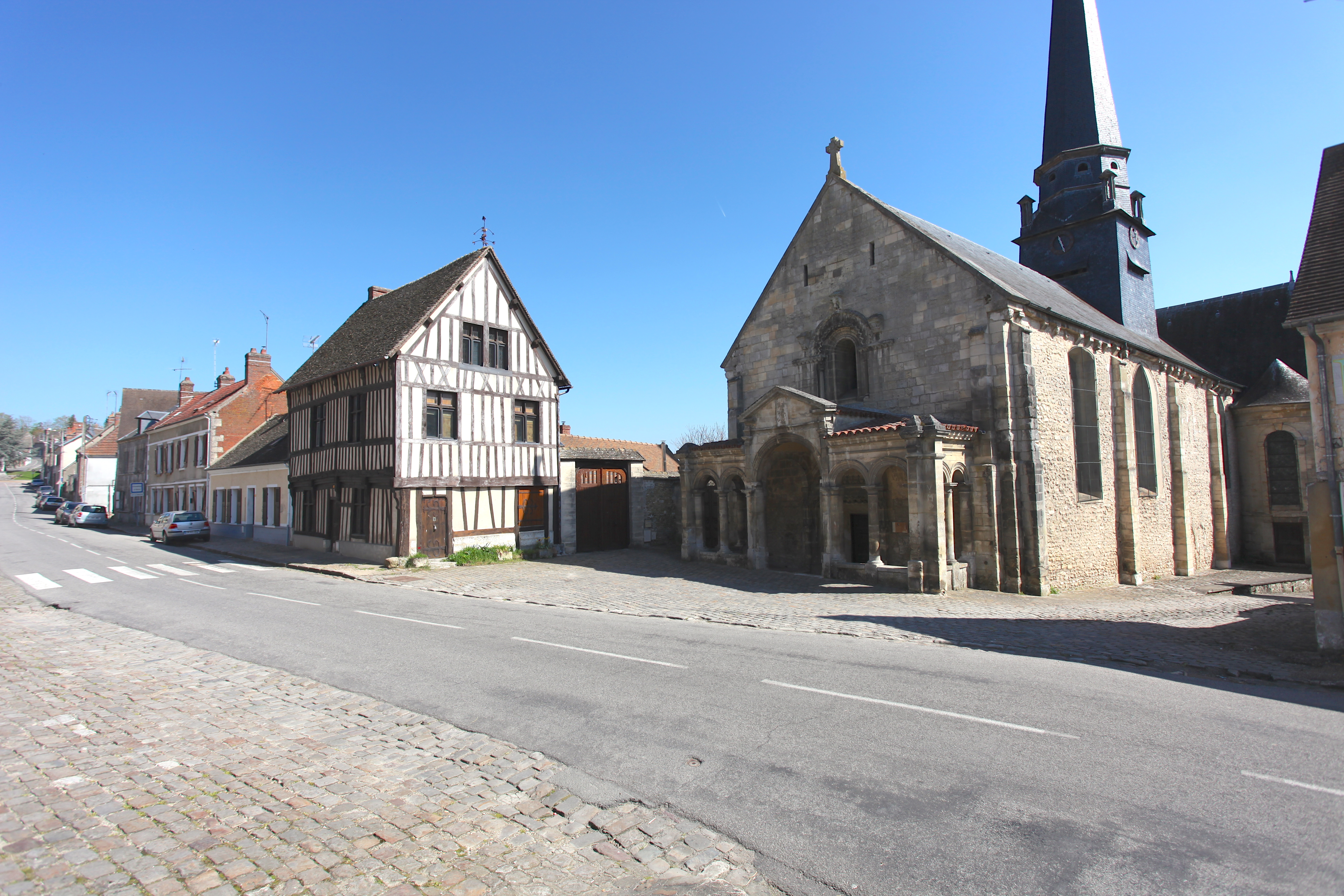
- The church in Dangu
- Location of Dangu
- Location within France Location within Normandy
- Coordinates: 49°15′12″N 1°41′51″E
- Country: France
- Region: Normandy
- Department: Eure
- Arrondissement: Les Andelys
- Canton: Gisors

Government
  - Mayor (2020–2026): Gilles Delon
- Area^{1}: 7.97 km^{2} (3.08 sq mi)
- Elevation: 43 m (141 ft)
- Highest elevation: 101 m (331 ft)
- Lowest elevation: 40 m (130 ft)
- Population (2023): 527
  - Density: 66.1/km^{2} (171/sq mi)
- Time zone: UTC+01:00 (CET)
  - Summer (DST): UTC+02:00 (CEST)
- INSEE/Postal code: 27199 /27720
- ^{1} French Land Register data, which excludes lakes, ponds, glaciers > 1 km^{2} (0.386 sq mi or 247 acres) and river estuaries.

Dangu (French pronunciation: [dɑ̃ɡy]) is a commune on the river Epte in the Eure department in the Normandy region in northern France.

It is home to the renowned Haras de Dangu, once a large estate and thoroughbred horse breeding and training farm owned by Count Frédéric de Lagrange (1815–1883).

== Population ==
Historical population
Year	Pop.	±% p.a.
1968	394	—
1975	519	+4.01%
1982	515	−0.11%
1990	610	+2.14%
1999	589	−0.39%
2007	576	−0.28%
2012	608	+1.09%
2017	573	−1.18%
2023	527	−1.39%
Source: INSEE

== See also ==
- Communes of the Eure department
