= Longchamps, Eure =

Longchamps
- Commune
- Coat of arms
- Location of Longchamps
- Location within France Location within Normandy
- Coordinates: 49°21′40″N 1°37′34″E
- Country: France
- Region: Normandy
- Department: Eure
- Arrondissement: Les Andelys
- Canton: Gisors

Government
  - Mayor (2020–2026): Nicolas Lainé
- Area^{1}: 15.43 km^{2} (5.96 sq mi)
- Elevation: 120 m (390 ft)
- Highest elevation: 143 m (469 ft)
- Lowest elevation: 94 m (308 ft)
- Population (2023): 662
  - Density: 42.9/km^{2} (111/sq mi)
- Time zone: UTC+01:00 (CET)
  - Summer (DST): UTC+02:00 (CEST)
- INSEE/Postal code: 27372 /27150
- ^{1} French Land Register data, which excludes lakes, ponds, glaciers > 1 km^{2} (0.386 sq mi or 247 acres) and river estuaries.

Longchamps (French pronunciation: [lɔ̃ʃɑ̃]) is a commune in the Eure department in Normandy in northern France.

== Population ==
Historical population
Year	Pop.	±% p.a.
1968	385	—
1975	350	−1.35%
1982	333	−0.71%
1990	432	+3.31%
1999	467	+0.87%
2007	554	+2.16%
2012	622	+2.34%
2017	635	+0.41%
2023	662	+0.70%
Source: INSEE

== See also ==
- Communes of the Eure department
