= Gamaches-en-Vexin =

- Commune
- Location of Gamaches-en-Vexin
- Location within France Location within Normandy
- Coordinates: 49°16′14″N 1°37′02″E
- Country: France
- Region: Normandy
- Department: Eure
- Arrondissement: Les Andelys
- Canton: Gisors

Government
  - Mayor (2020–2026): Guillaume Voeltzel
- Area^{1}: 8.68 km^{2} (3.35 sq mi)
- Highest elevation: 115 m (377 ft)
- Lowest elevation: 72 m (236 ft)
- Population (2023): 295
  - Density: 34.0/km^{2} (88.0/sq mi)
- Time zone: UTC+01:00 (CET)
  - Summer (DST): UTC+02:00 (CEST)
- INSEE/Postal code: 27276 /27150
- ^{1} French Land Register data, which excludes lakes, ponds, glaciers > 1 km^{2} (0.386 sq mi or 247 acres) and river estuaries.

Gamaches-en-Vexin (French pronunciation: [ɡamaʃ ɑ̃ vɛksɛ̃], literally Gamaches in Vexin) is a commune in the Eure department in northern France.

== Population ==
Historical population
Year	Pop.	±% p.a.
1968	306	—
1975	271	−1.72%
1982	296	+1.27%
1990	313	+0.70%
1999	329	+0.56%
2007	318	−0.42%
2012	319	+0.06%
2017	291	−1.82%
2023	295	+0.23%
Source: INSEE

== See also ==
- Communes of the Eure department
