= Guerny =

- Commune
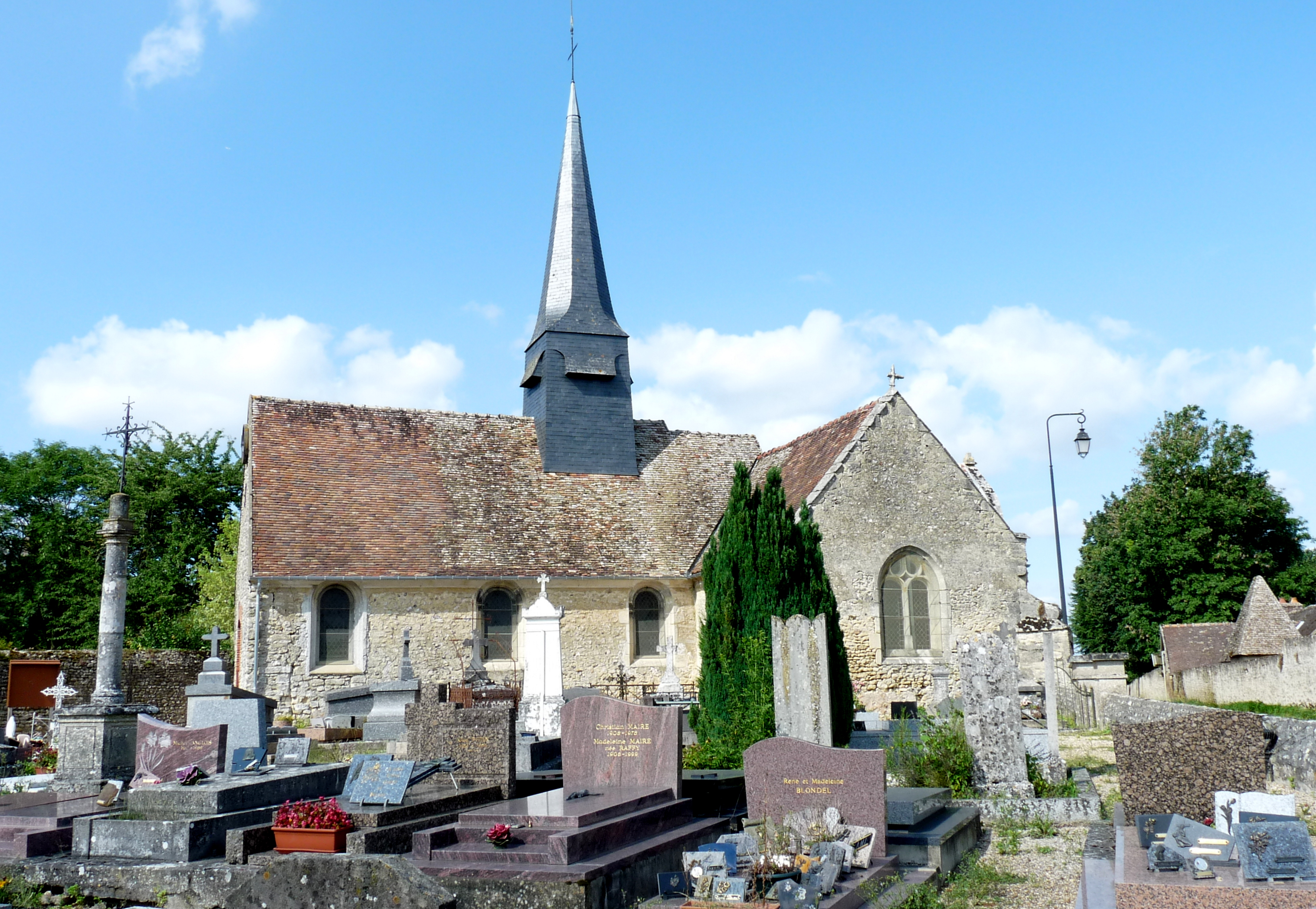
- The church in Guerny
- Location of Guerny
- Location within France Location within Normandy
- Coordinates: 49°13′21″N 1°40′48″E
- Country: France
- Region: Normandy
- Department: Eure
- Arrondissement: Les Andelys
- Canton: Gisors

Government
  - Mayor (2020–2026): Catherine Lepiller
- Area^{1}: 6.03 km^{2} (2.33 sq mi)
- Elevation: 44 m (144 ft)
- Highest elevation: 135 m (443 ft)
- Lowest elevation: 34 m (112 ft)
- Population (2023): 150
  - Density: 25/km^{2} (64/sq mi)
- Time zone: UTC+01:00 (CET)
  - Summer (DST): UTC+02:00 (CEST)
- INSEE/Postal code: 27304 /27720
- ^{1} French Land Register data, which excludes lakes, ponds, glaciers > 1 km^{2} (0.386 sq mi or 247 acres) and river estuaries.

Guerny (French pronunciation: [ɡɛʁni]) is a commune in the Eure department in northern France.

== Population ==
Historical population
Year	Pop.	±% p.a.
1968	121	—
1975	96	−3.25%
1982	171	+8.60%
1990	127	−3.65%
1999	185	+4.27%
2007	175	−0.69%
2012	165	−1.17%
2017	172	+0.83%
2023	150	−2.26%
Source: INSEE

== See also ==
- Communes of the Eure department
