= Hacqueville =

- Commune
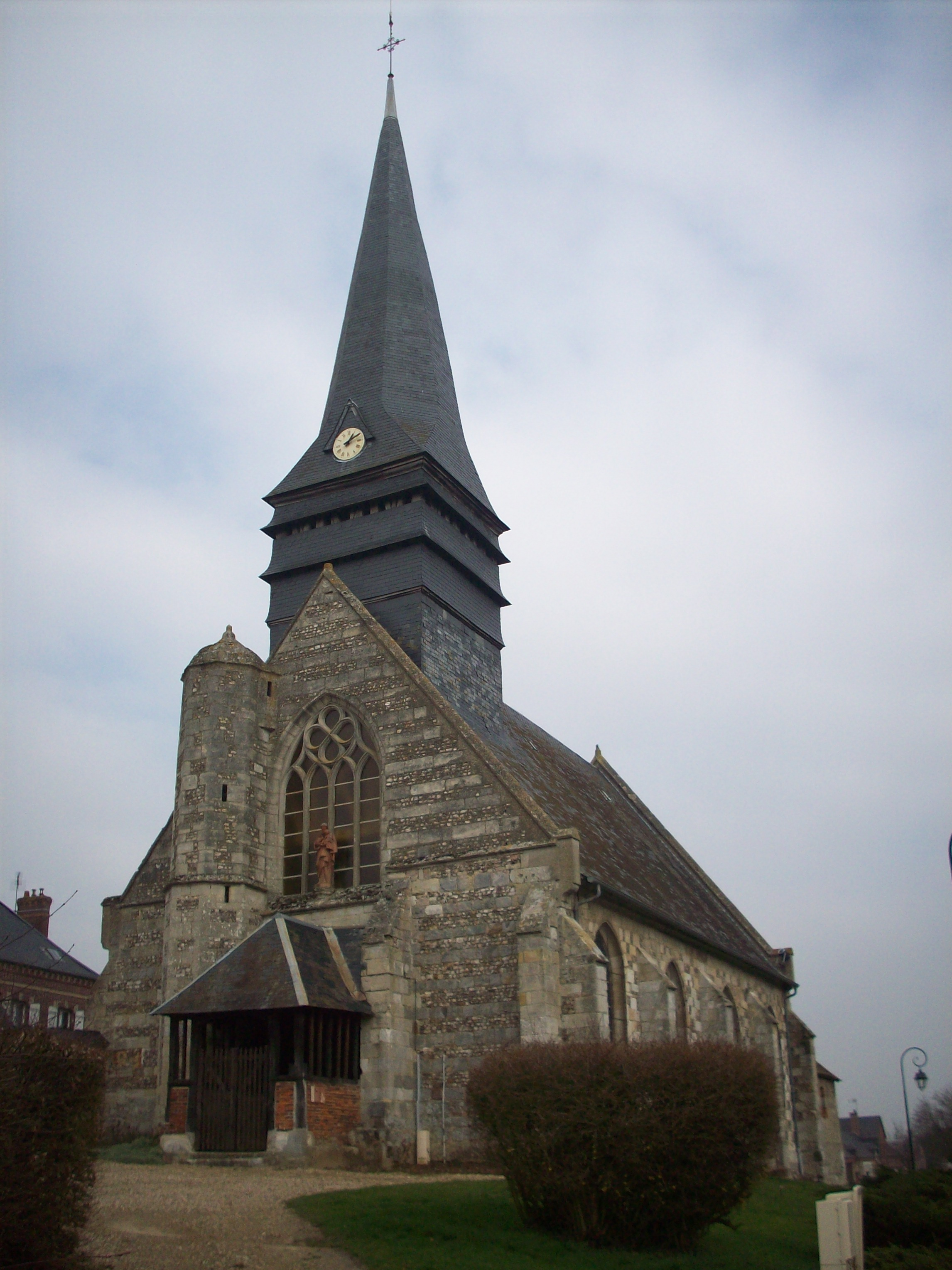
- The church Saint-Lucien in Hacqueville

- Coat of arms
- Location of Hacqueville
- Location within France Location within Normandy
- Coordinates: 49°16′57″N 1°33′23″E
- Country: France
- Region: Normandy
- Department: Eure
- Arrondissement: Les Andelys
- Canton: Gisors
- Intercommunality: Vexin Normand

Government
  - Mayor (2020–2026): France Duval
- Area^{1}: 9.81 km^{2} (3.79 sq mi)
- Elevation: 118 m (387 ft)
- Highest elevation: 151 m (495 ft)
- Lowest elevation: 95 m (312 ft)
- Population (2023): 394
  - Density: 40.2/km^{2} (104/sq mi)
- Time zone: UTC+01:00 (CET)
  - Summer (DST): UTC+02:00 (CEST)
- INSEE/Postal code: 27310 /27150
- ^{1} French Land Register data, which excludes lakes, ponds, glaciers > 1 km^{2} (0.386 sq mi or 247 acres) and river estuaries.

Hacqueville (French pronunciation: [akvil]) is a commune in the Eure department in north western France.

== Population ==
Historical population
Year	Pop.	±% p.a.
1968	378	—
1975	293	−3.57%
1982	322	+1.36%
1990	368	+1.68%
1999	420	+1.48%
2007	460	+1.14%
2012	450	−0.44%
2017	438	−0.54%
2023	394	−1.75%
Source: INSEE

== Personalities ==
- Marc Isambart Brunel, builder of the Thames Tunnel, was born in Hacqueville in 1769.

== See also ==
- Communes of the Eure department
