= Canton of Vernon =

Canton in Normandy, France

Coordinates: 49.09°N 1.48°E

The canton of Vernon is an administrative division of the Eure department, northern France. It was created at the French canton reorganisation which came into effect in March 2015. Its seat is in Vernon.

It consists of the following communes:

1. Gasny
2. Giverny
3. Sainte-Geneviève-lès-Gasny
4. Vernon
