= Vesly, Eure =

Vesly
- Commune
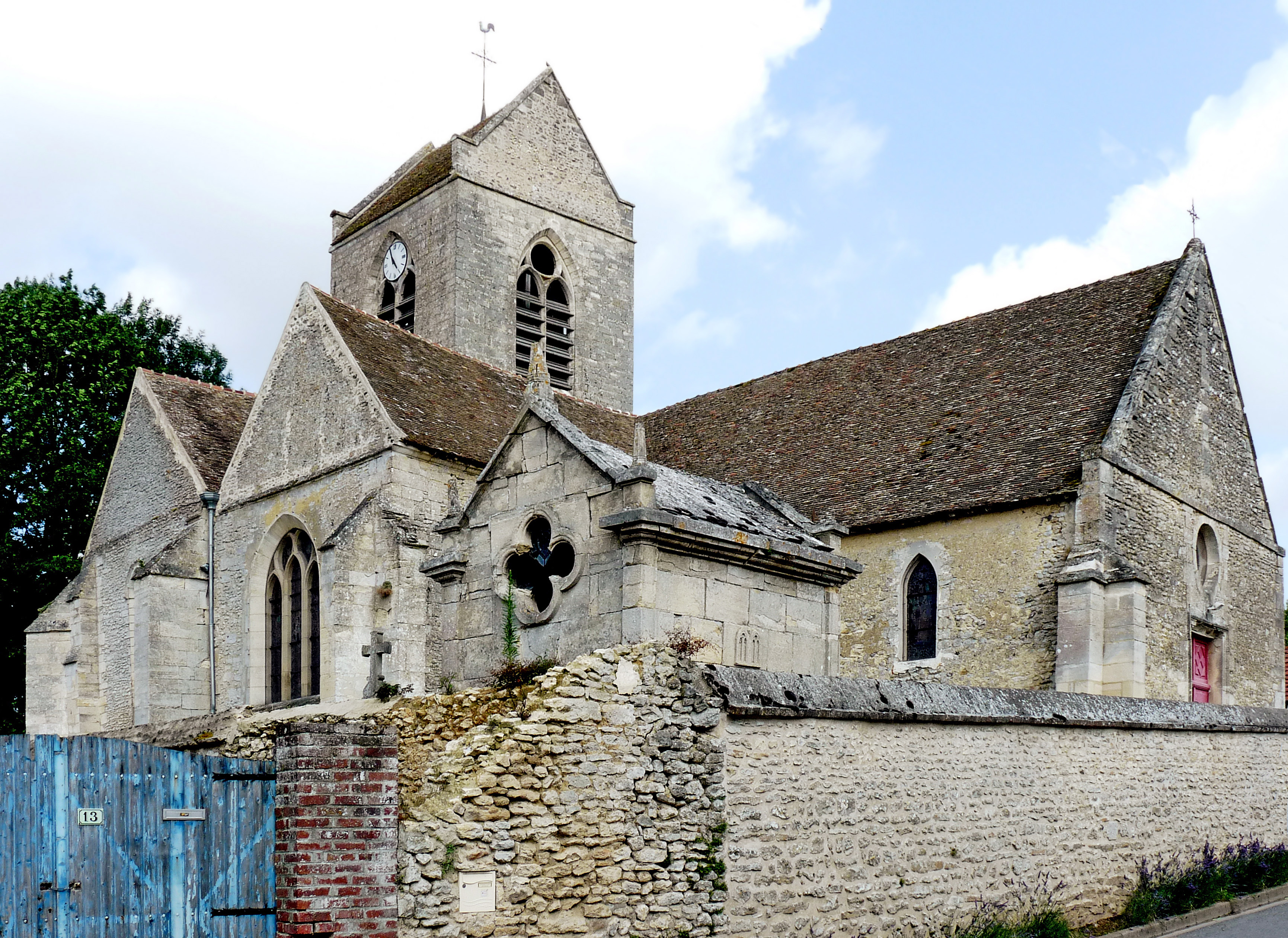
- The church in Vesly

- Coat of arms
- Location of Vesly
- Location within France Location within Normandy
- Coordinates: 49°14′36″N 1°39′12″E
- Country: France
- Region: Normandy
- Department: Eure
- Arrondissement: Les Andelys
- Canton: Gisors

Government
  - Mayor (2020–2026): Annie Lefevre
- Area^{1}: 11.96 km^{2} (4.62 sq mi)
- Elevation: 95 m (312 ft)
- Highest elevation: 145 m (476 ft)
- Lowest elevation: 83 m (272 ft)
- Population (2023): 613
  - Density: 51.3/km^{2} (133/sq mi)
- Time zone: UTC+01:00 (CET)
  - Summer (DST): UTC+02:00 (CEST)
- INSEE/Postal code: 27682 /27870
- ^{1} French Land Register data, which excludes lakes, ponds, glaciers > 1 km^{2} (0.386 sq mi or 247 acres) and river estuaries.

Vesly (French pronunciation: [vɛli]) is a commune in the Eure department in Normandy in northern France.

== Population ==
Historical population
Year	Pop.	±% p.a.
1968	444	—
1975	411	−1.10%
1982	459	+1.59%
1990	538	+2.00%
1999	620	+1.59%
2007	652	+0.63%
2012	690	+1.14%
2017	694	+0.12%
2023	613	−2.05%
Source: INSEE

== See also ==
- Communes of the Eure department
