= Bernouville =

- Commune
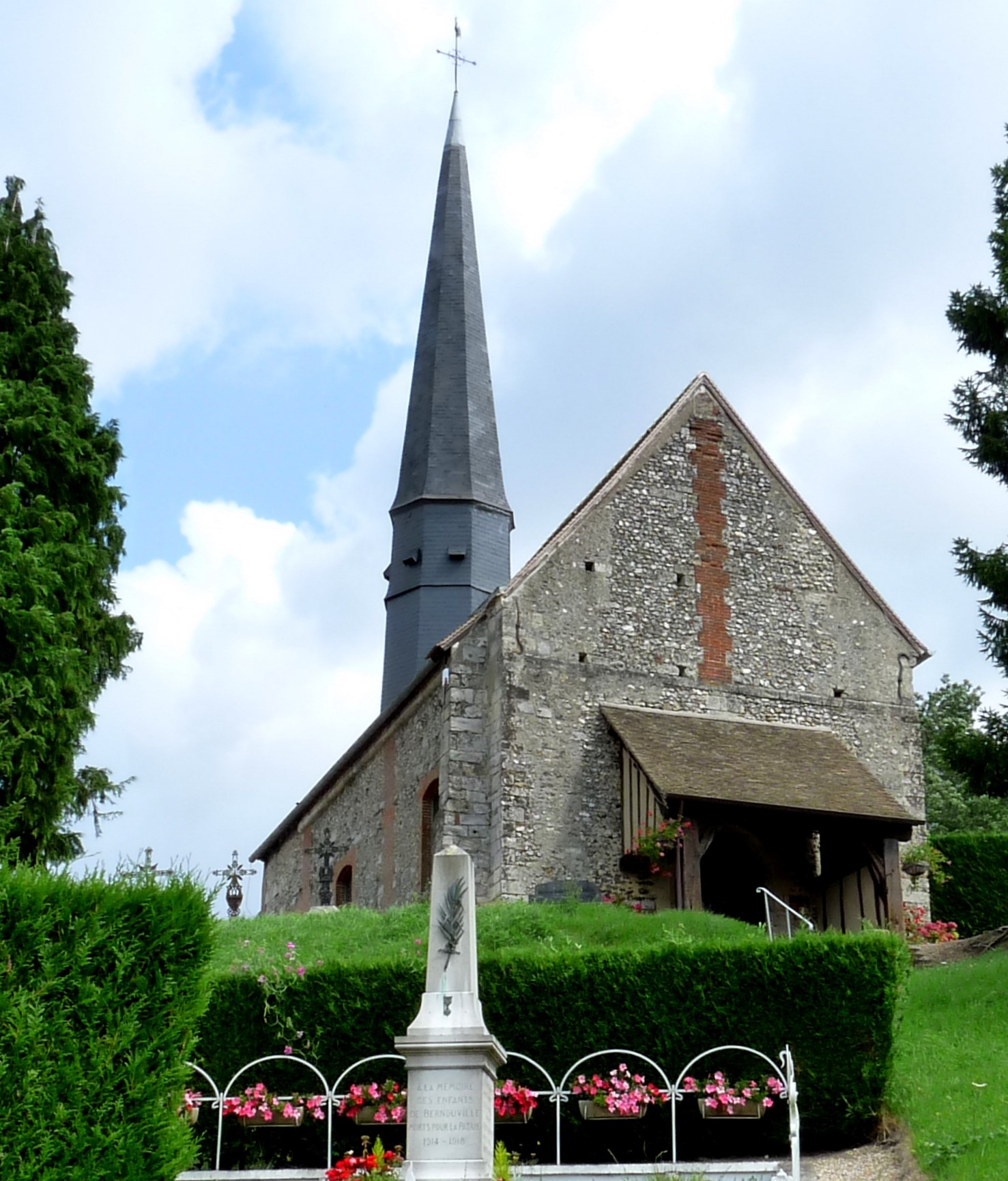
- Our Lady of the Assumption Church

- Coat of arms
- Location of Bernouville
- Location within France Location within Normandy
- Coordinates: 49°17′29″N 1°41′39″E
- Country: France
- Region: Normandy
- Department: Eure
- Arrondissement: Les Andelys
- Canton: Gisors

Government
  - Mayor (2020–2026): Christian Langlet
- Area^{1}: 6.12 km^{2} (2.36 sq mi)
- Elevation: 72 m (236 ft)
- Highest elevation: 101 m (331 ft)
- Lowest elevation: 61 m (200 ft)
- Population (2023): 321
  - Density: 52.5/km^{2} (136/sq mi)
- Time zone: UTC+01:00 (CET)
  - Summer (DST): UTC+02:00 (CEST)
- INSEE/Postal code: 27059 /27660
- ^{1} French Land Register data, which excludes lakes, ponds, glaciers > 1 km^{2} (0.386 sq mi or 247 acres) and river estuaries.

Bernouville (French pronunciation: [bɛʁnuvil]) is a commune in the Eure department in Normandy in northern France.

== Population ==
Historical population
Year	Pop.	±% p.a.
1968	234	—
1975	203	−2.01%
1982	229	+1.74%
1990	242	+0.69%
1999	349	+4.15%
2007	327	−0.81%
2012	306	−1.32%
2017	303	−0.20%
2023	321	+0.97%
Source: INSEE

== See also ==
- Communes of the Eure department
