= Coudray, Eure =

Coudray
- Commune
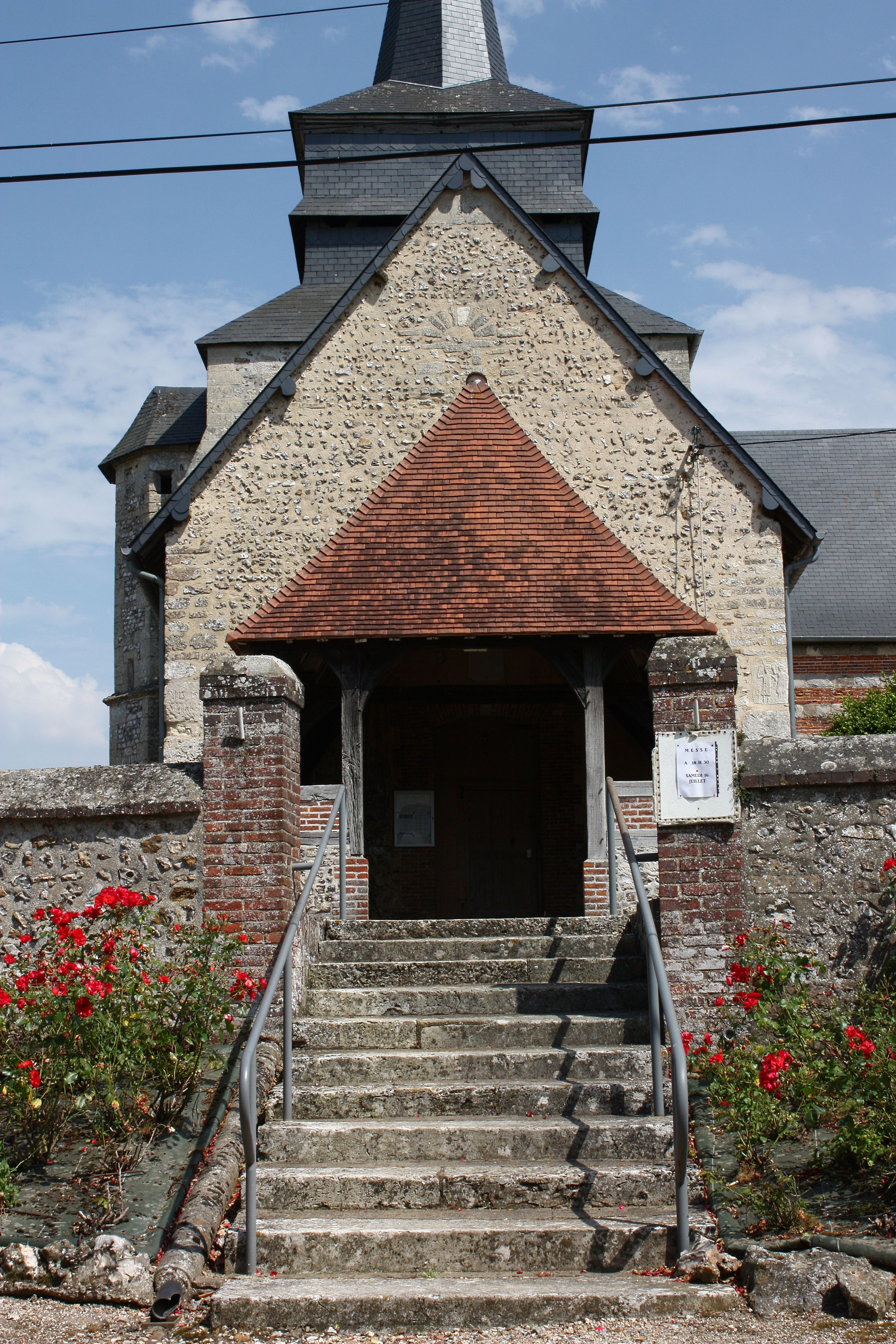
- The church in Coudray
- Location of Coudray
- Location within France Location within Normandy
- Coordinates: 49°20′17″N 1°30′20″E
- Country: France
- Region: Normandy
- Department: Eure
- Arrondissement: Les Andelys
- Canton: Gisors

Government
  - Mayor (2020–2026): Virginie Vatebled
- Area^{1}: 7.78 km^{2} (3.00 sq mi)
- Elevation: 120 m (390 ft)
- Highest elevation: 175 m (574 ft)
- Lowest elevation: 82 m (269 ft)
- Population (2023): 216
  - Density: 27.8/km^{2} (71.9/sq mi)
- Time zone: UTC+01:00 (CET)
  - Summer (DST): UTC+02:00 (CEST)
- INSEE/Postal code: 27176 /27150
- ^{1} French Land Register data, which excludes lakes, ponds, glaciers > 1 km^{2} (0.386 sq mi or 247 acres) and river estuaries.

Coudray (French pronunciation: [kudʁɛ]) is a commune in the Eure department in northern France.

== Population ==
Historical population
Year	Pop.	±% p.a.
1968	193	—
1975	175	−1.39%
1982	170	−0.41%
1990	188	+1.27%
1999	192	+0.23%
2007	225	+2.00%
2012	226	+0.09%
2017	218	−0.72%
2023	216	−0.15%
Source: INSEE

== See also ==
- Communes of the Eure department
