= Morgny =

- Commune
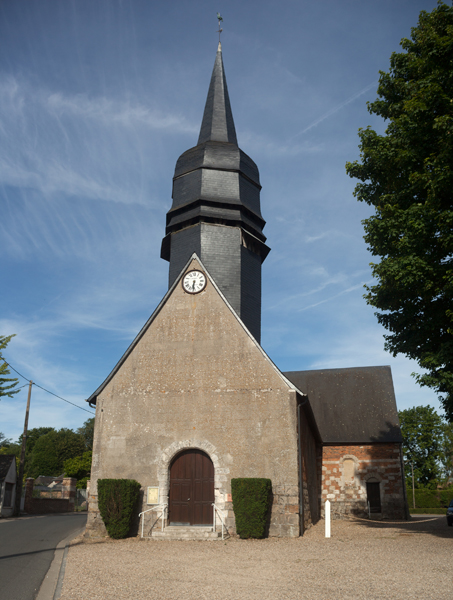
- The church in Morgny
- Location of Morgny
- Location within France Location within Normandy
- Coordinates: 49°23′01″N 1°35′29″E
- Country: France
- Region: Normandy
- Department: Eure
- Arrondissement: Les Andelys
- Canton: Gisors

Government
  - Mayor (2020–2026): Christophe Griffon
- Area^{1}: 17.37 km^{2} (6.71 sq mi)
- Elevation: 150 m (490 ft)
- Highest elevation: 161 m (528 ft)
- Lowest elevation: 110 m (360 ft)
- Population (2023): 650
  - Density: 37/km^{2} (97/sq mi)
- Time zone: UTC+01:00 (CET)
  - Summer (DST): UTC+02:00 (CEST)
- INSEE/Postal code: 27417 /27150
- ^{1} French Land Register data, which excludes lakes, ponds, glaciers > 1 km^{2} (0.386 sq mi or 247 acres) and river estuaries.

Morgny (French pronunciation: [mɔʁɲi]) is a commune in the Eure department in Normandy in northern France.

== Population ==
Historical population
Year	Pop.	±% p.a.
1968	401	—
1975	355	−1.73%
1982	382	+1.05%
1990	375	−0.23%
1999	410	+1.00%
2007	528	+3.21%
2012	602	+2.66%
2017	656	+1.73%
2023	650	−0.15%
Source: INSEE

== See also ==
- Communes of the Eure department
