= Bazincourt-sur-Epte =

- Commune
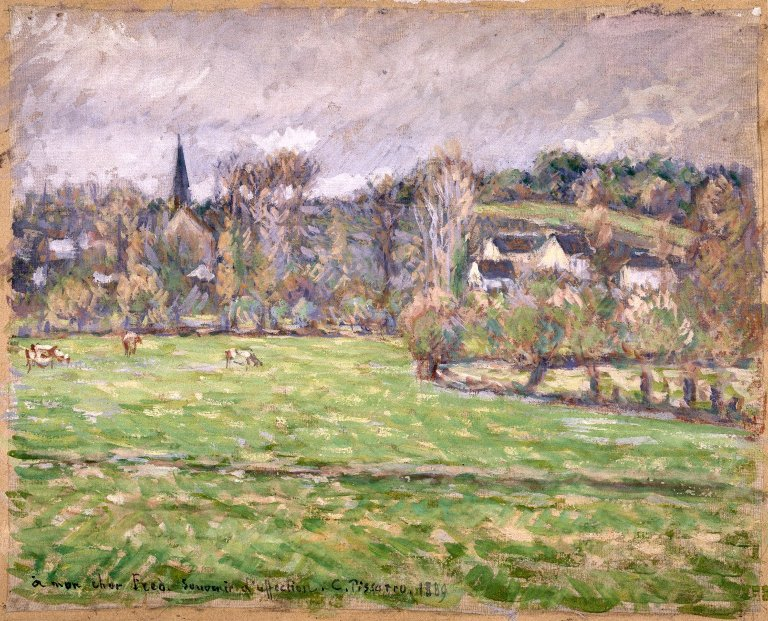
- A view of Bazincourt by Camille Pissarro

- Coat of arms
- Location of Bazincourt-sur-Epte
- Location within France Location within Normandy
- Coordinates: 49°18′45″N 1°46′05″E
- Country: France
- Region: Normandy
- Department: Eure
- Arrondissement: Les Andelys
- Canton: Gisors

Government
  - Mayor (2020–2026): Hervé Glezgo
- Area^{1}: 11 km^{2} (4.2 sq mi)
- Highest elevation: 139 m (456 ft)
- Lowest elevation: 52 m (171 ft)
- Population (2023): 778
  - Density: 71/km^{2} (180/sq mi)
- Time zone: UTC+01:00 (CET)
  - Summer (DST): UTC+02:00 (CEST)
- INSEE/Postal code: 27045 /27140
- ^{1} French Land Register data, which excludes lakes, ponds, glaciers > 1 km^{2} (0.386 sq mi or 247 acres) and river estuaries.

Bazincourt-sur-Epte (French pronunciation: [bazɛ̃kuʁ syʁ ɛpt], literally Bazincourt on Epte) is a commune in the Eure department in Normandy in northern France.

== Population ==
Historical population
Year	Pop.	±% p.a.
1968	310	—
1975	316	+0.27%
1982	354	+1.64%
1990	496	+4.31%
1999	578	+1.71%
2007	633	+1.14%
2012	744	+3.28%
2017	757	+0.35%
2023	778	+0.46%
Source: INSEE

== See also ==
- Communes of the Eure department
