= Sainte-Marie-de-Vatimesnil =

- Commune
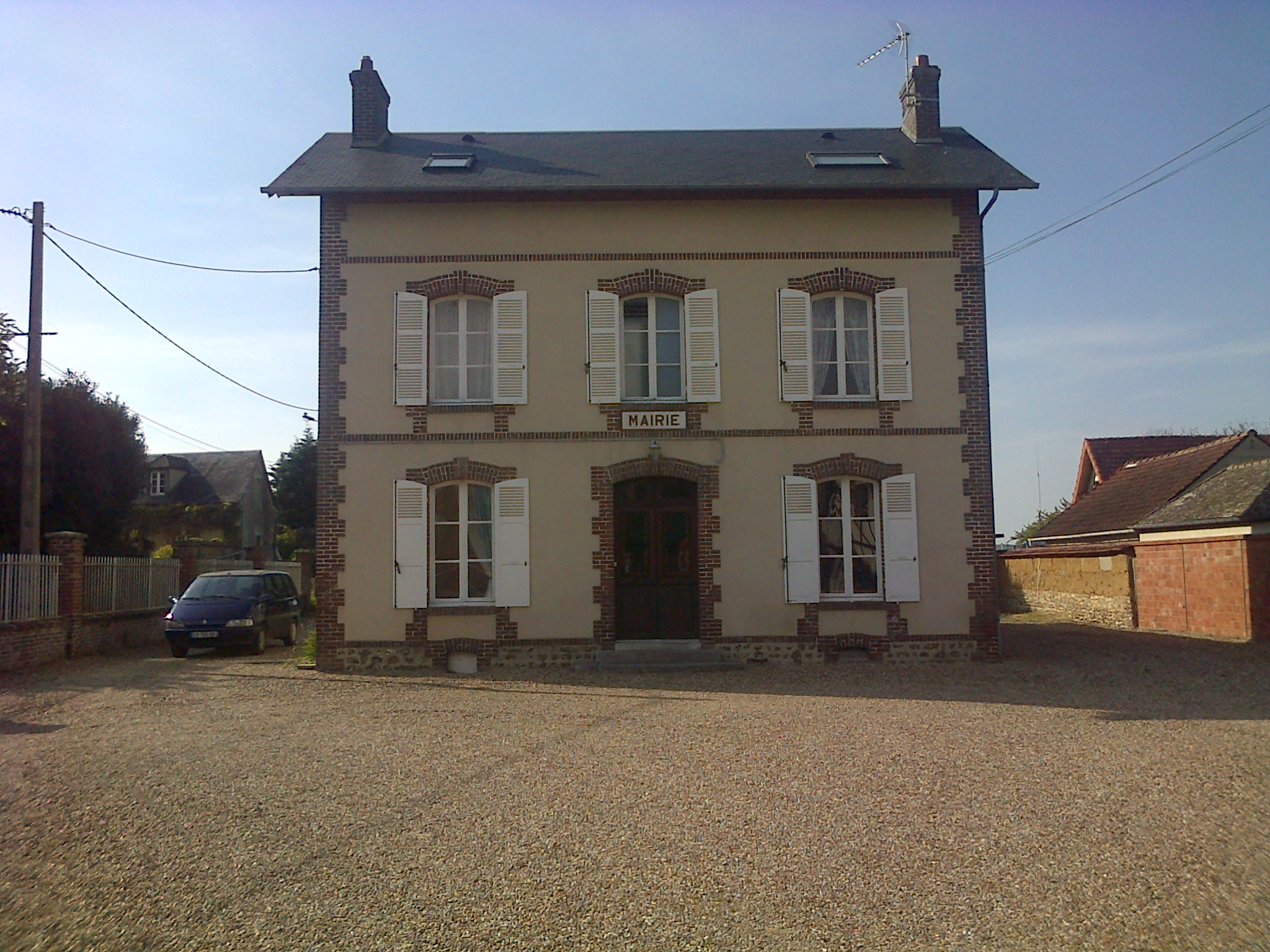
- The town hall in Sainte-Marie-de-Vatimesnil

- Coat of arms
- Location of Sainte-Marie-de-Vatimesnil
- Location within France Location within Normandy
- Coordinates: 49°16′42″N 1°35′08″E
- Country: France
- Region: Normandy
- Department: Eure
- Arrondissement: Les Andelys
- Canton: Gisors

Government
  - Mayor (2020–2026): Jean D'Astorg
- Area^{1}: 7.35 km^{2} (2.84 sq mi)
- Elevation: 108 m (354 ft)
- Highest elevation: 144 m (472 ft)
- Lowest elevation: 83 m (272 ft)
- Population (2023): 262
  - Density: 35.6/km^{2} (92.3/sq mi)
- Time zone: UTC+01:00 (CET)
  - Summer (DST): UTC+02:00 (CEST)
- INSEE/Postal code: 27567 /27150
- ^{1} French Land Register data, which excludes lakes, ponds, glaciers > 1 km^{2} (0.386 sq mi or 247 acres) and river estuaries.

Sainte-Marie-de-Vatimesnil (French pronunciation: [sɛ̃t maʁi də vatimɛnil]) is a commune in the Eure department in Normandy in northern France.

== Population ==
Historical population
Year	Pop.	±% p.a.
1968	211	—
1975	176	−2.56%
1982	194	+1.40%
1990	204	+0.63%
1999	235	+1.58%
2007	246	+0.57%
2012	253	+0.56%
2017	269	+1.23%
2023	262	−0.44%
Source: INSEE

== See also ==
- Communes of the Eure department
