= Doudeauville-en-Vexin =

- Commune
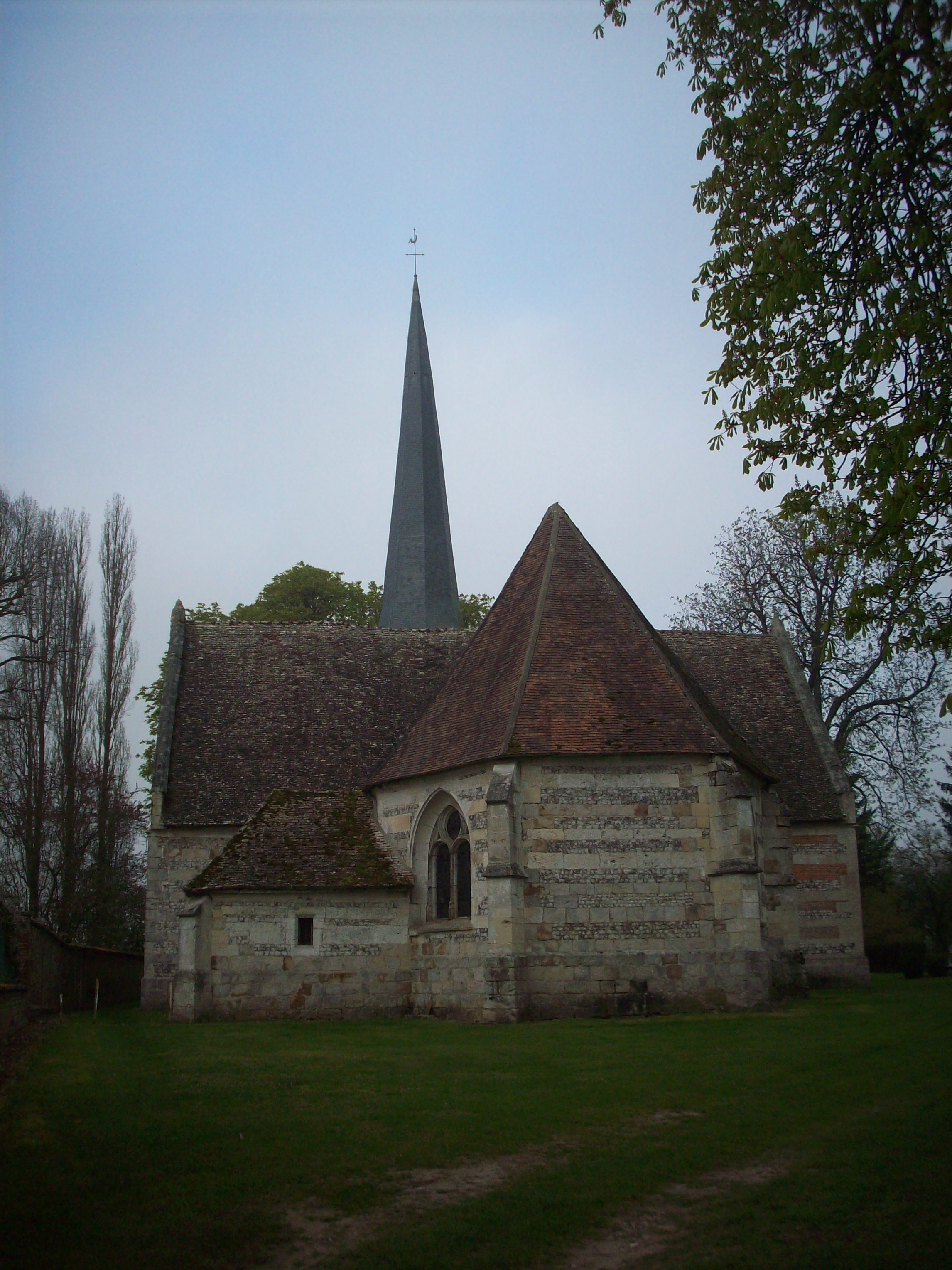
- The church in Doudeauville-en-Vexin
- Location of Doudeauville-en-Vexin
- Location within France Location within Normandy
- Coordinates: 49°19′42″N 1°35′25″E
- Country: France
- Region: Normandy
- Department: Eure
- Arrondissement: Les Andelys
- Canton: Gisors

Government
  - Mayor (2020–2026): Valérie Bezard
- Area^{1}: 5.85 km^{2} (2.26 sq mi)
- Elevation: 105 m (344 ft)
- Highest elevation: 135 m (443 ft)
- Lowest elevation: 82 m (269 ft)
- Population (2023): 261
  - Density: 44.6/km^{2} (116/sq mi)
- Time zone: UTC+01:00 (CET)
  - Summer (DST): UTC+02:00 (CEST)
- INSEE/Postal code: 27204 /27150
- ^{1} French Land Register data, which excludes lakes, ponds, glaciers > 1 km^{2} (0.386 sq mi or 247 acres) and river estuaries.

Doudeauville-en-Vexin (French pronunciation: [dudovil ɑ̃ vɛksɛ̃], literally Doudeauville in Vexin) is a commune in the Eure department in northern France.

== Population ==
Historical population
Year	Pop.	±% p.a.
1968	235	—
1975	180	−3.74%
1982	192	+0.93%
1990	216	+1.48%
1999	233	+0.85%
2007	297	+3.08%
2012	308	+0.73%
2017	302	−0.39%
2023	261	−2.40%
Source: INSEE

== See also ==
- Communes of the Eure department
