= Bézu-Saint-Éloi =

- Commune
- Coat of arms
- Location of Bézu-Saint-Éloi
- Location within France Location within Normandy
- Coordinates: 49°17′45″N 1°42′07″E
- Country: France
- Region: Normandy
- Department: Eure
- Arrondissement: Les Andelys
- Canton: Gisors

Government
  - Mayor (2020–2026): Anthony Brunet
- Area^{1}: 11.42 km^{2} (4.41 sq mi)
- Elevation: 110 m (360 ft)
- Highest elevation: 117 m (384 ft)
- Lowest elevation: 48 m (157 ft)
- Population (2023): 1,626
  - Density: 142.4/km^{2} (368.8/sq mi)
- Time zone: UTC+01:00 (CET)
  - Summer (DST): UTC+02:00 (CEST)
- INSEE/Postal code: 27067 /27660
- ^{1} French Land Register data, which excludes lakes, ponds, glaciers > 1 km^{2} (0.386 sq mi or 247 acres) and river estuaries.

Bézu-Saint-Éloi (French pronunciation: [bezy sɛ̃.t‿elwa]) is a commune in the Eure department and Normandy region of France.

== Population ==
Historical population
Year	Pop.	±% p.a.
1968	750	—
1975	747	−0.06%
1982	730	−0.33%
1990	1,061	+4.78%
1999	1,170	+1.09%
2007	1,209	+0.41%
2012	1,475	+4.06%
2017	1,505	+0.40%
2023	1,626	+1.30%
Source: INSEE

== See also ==
- Communes of the Eure department
