= Chauvincourt-Provemont =

- Commune
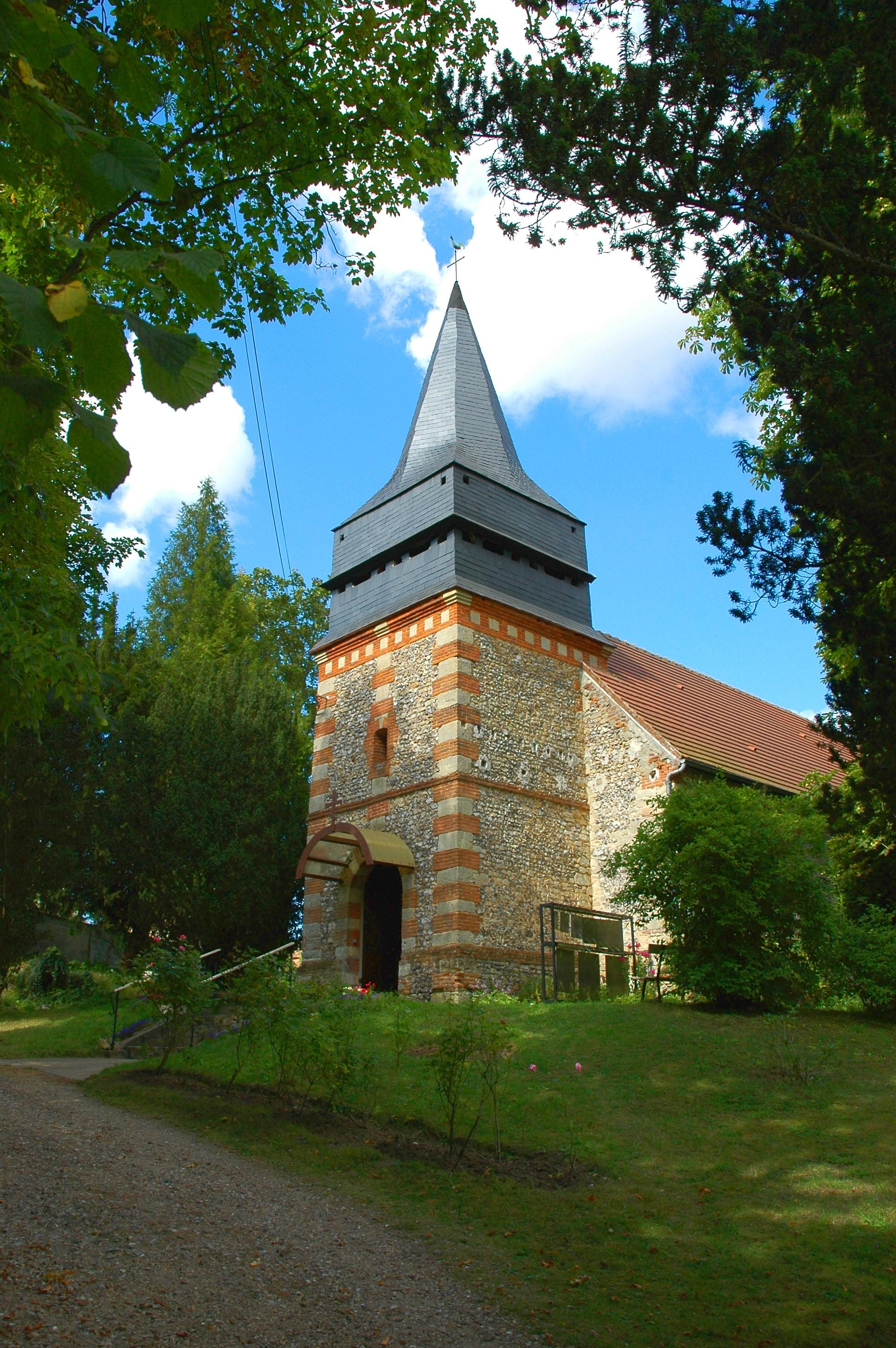
- The orthodox church in Chauvincourt-Provemont
- Location of Chauvincourt-Provemont
- Location within France Location within Normandy
- Coordinates: 49°16′43″N 1°38′25″E
- Country: France
- Region: Normandy
- Department: Eure
- Arrondissement: Les Andelys
- Canton: Gisors

Government
  - Mayor (2020–2026): Fabrice Le Naour
- Area^{1}: 10.83 km^{2} (4.18 sq mi)
- Highest elevation: 102 m (335 ft)
- Lowest elevation: 64 m (210 ft)
- Population (2023): 397
  - Density: 36.7/km^{2} (94.9/sq mi)
- Time zone: UTC+01:00 (CET)
  - Summer (DST): UTC+02:00 (CEST)
- INSEE/Postal code: 27153 /27150
- ^{1} French Land Register data, which excludes lakes, ponds, glaciers > 1 km^{2} (0.386 sq mi or 247 acres) and river estuaries.

Chauvincourt-Provemont (French pronunciation: [ʃovɛ̃kuʁ pʁɔvmɔ̃]) is a commune in the Eure department in northern France.

== Population ==
Historical population
Year	Pop.	±% p.a.
1968	289	—
1975	263	−1.34%
1982	243	−1.12%
1990	248	+0.25%
1999	293	+1.87%
2007	329	+1.46%
2012	348	+1.13%
2017	365	+0.96%
2023	397	+1.41%
Source: INSEE

== See also ==
- Communes of the Eure department
