= Canton of Gisors =

Canton of the Eure department, France

Coordinates: 49.28°N 1.78°E

The canton of Gisors is an administrative division of the Eure department, northern France. Its borders were modified at the French canton reorganisation which came into effect in March 2015. Its seat is in Gisors.

It consists of the following communes:

1. Amécourt
2. Authevernes
3. Bazincourt-sur-Epte
4. Bernouville
5. Bézu-Saint-Éloi
6. Chauvincourt-Provemont
7. Coudray
8. Dangu
9. Doudeauville-en-Vexin
10. Étrépagny
11. Farceaux
12. Gamaches-en-Vexin
13. Gisors
14. Guerny
15. Hacqueville
16. Hébécourt
17. Heudicourt
18. Longchamps
19. Morgny
20. Mouflaines
21. Neaufles-Saint-Martin
22. La Neuve-Grange
23. Nojeon-en-Vexin
24. Noyers
25. Puchay
26. Richeville
27. Saint-Denis-le-Ferment
28. Sainte-Marie-de-Vatimesnil
29. Sancourt
30. Saussay-la-Campagne
31. Le Thil
32. Les Thilliers-en-Vexin
33. Vesly
34. Villers-en-Vexin
