= Gasny =

- Commune
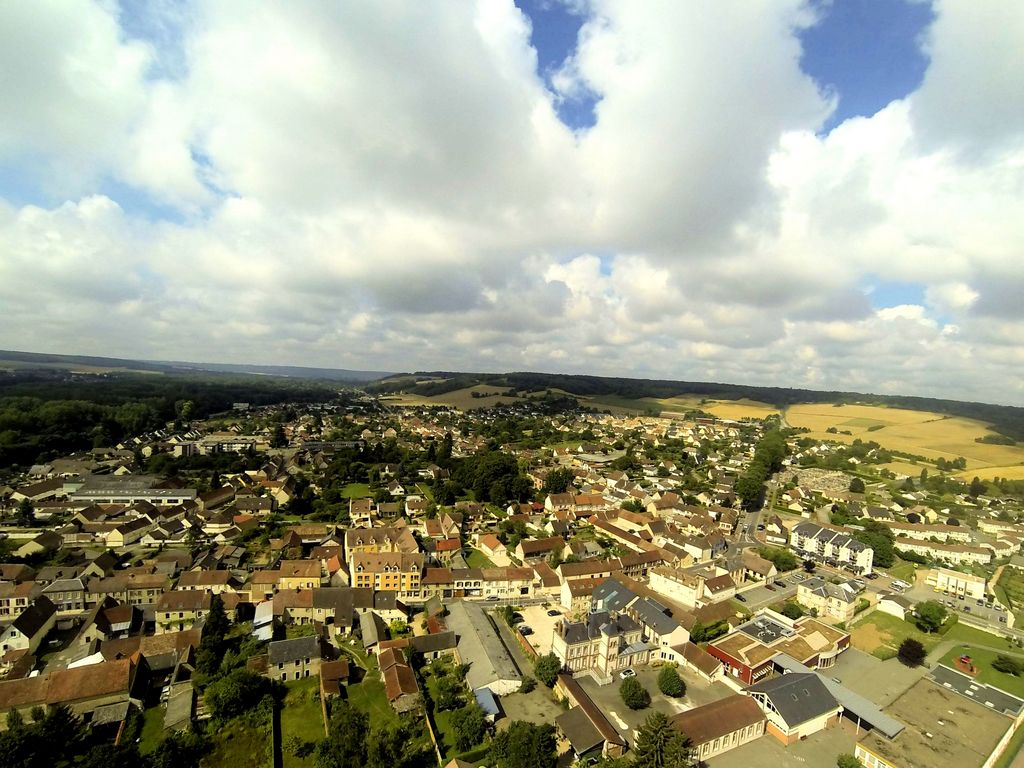
- An aerial view of Gasny

- Coat of arms
- Location of Gasny
- Location within France Location within Normandy
- Coordinates: 49°05′34″N 1°36′18″E
- Country: France
- Region: Normandy
- Department: Eure
- Arrondissement: Les Andelys
- Canton: Vernon
- Intercommunality: Seine Normandie Agglomération

Government
  - Mayor (2020–2026): Pascal Jolly
- Area^{1}: 12.89 km^{2} (4.98 sq mi)
- Elevation: 36 m (118 ft)
- Highest elevation: 136 m (446 ft)
- Lowest elevation: 19 m (62 ft)
- Population (2023): 3,062
  - Density: 237.5/km^{2} (615.2/sq mi)
- Time zone: UTC+01:00 (CET)
  - Summer (DST): UTC+02:00 (CEST)
- INSEE/Postal code: 27279 /27620
- ^{1} French Land Register data, which excludes lakes, ponds, glaciers > 1 km^{2} (0.386 sq mi or 247 acres) and river estuaries.

Gasny (French pronunciation: [ɡani]) is a commune in the Eure department in northern France.

== Population ==
Historical population

Year	Pop.	±% p.a.
1793	990	—
1800	1,105	+1.58%
1806	1,052	−0.82%
1821	1,091	+0.24%
1831	1,124	+0.30%
1836	1,182	+1.01%
1841	1,186	+0.07%
1846	1,170	−0.27%
1851	1,136	−0.59%
1856	1,040	−1.75%
1861	974	−1.30%
1866	897	−1.63%
1872	836	−1.17%
1876	830	−0.18%
1881	801	−0.71%
1886	822	+0.52%
1891	863	+0.98%
1896	823	−0.94%
1901	904	+1.90%

Year	Pop.	±% p.a.
1906	848	−1.27%
1911	907	+1.35%
1921	877	−0.34%
1926	914	+0.83%
1931	935	+0.46%
1936	930	−0.11%
1946	949	+0.20%
1954	1,066	+1.46%
1962	1,327	+2.78%
1968	1,645	+3.65%
1975	2,040	+3.12%
1982	2,638	+3.74%
1990	2,957	+1.44%
1999	2,941	−0.06%
2007	2,883	−0.25%
2012	3,076	+1.30%
2017	3,089	+0.08%
2023	3,062	−0.15%

Source: EHESS and INSEE (1968-2023)

== Personalities ==
- Georges Baptiste François Allix (1808-1881), military engineer in the French Navy.

== See also ==
- Communes of the Eure department
