= Bézu-la-Forêt =

- Commune
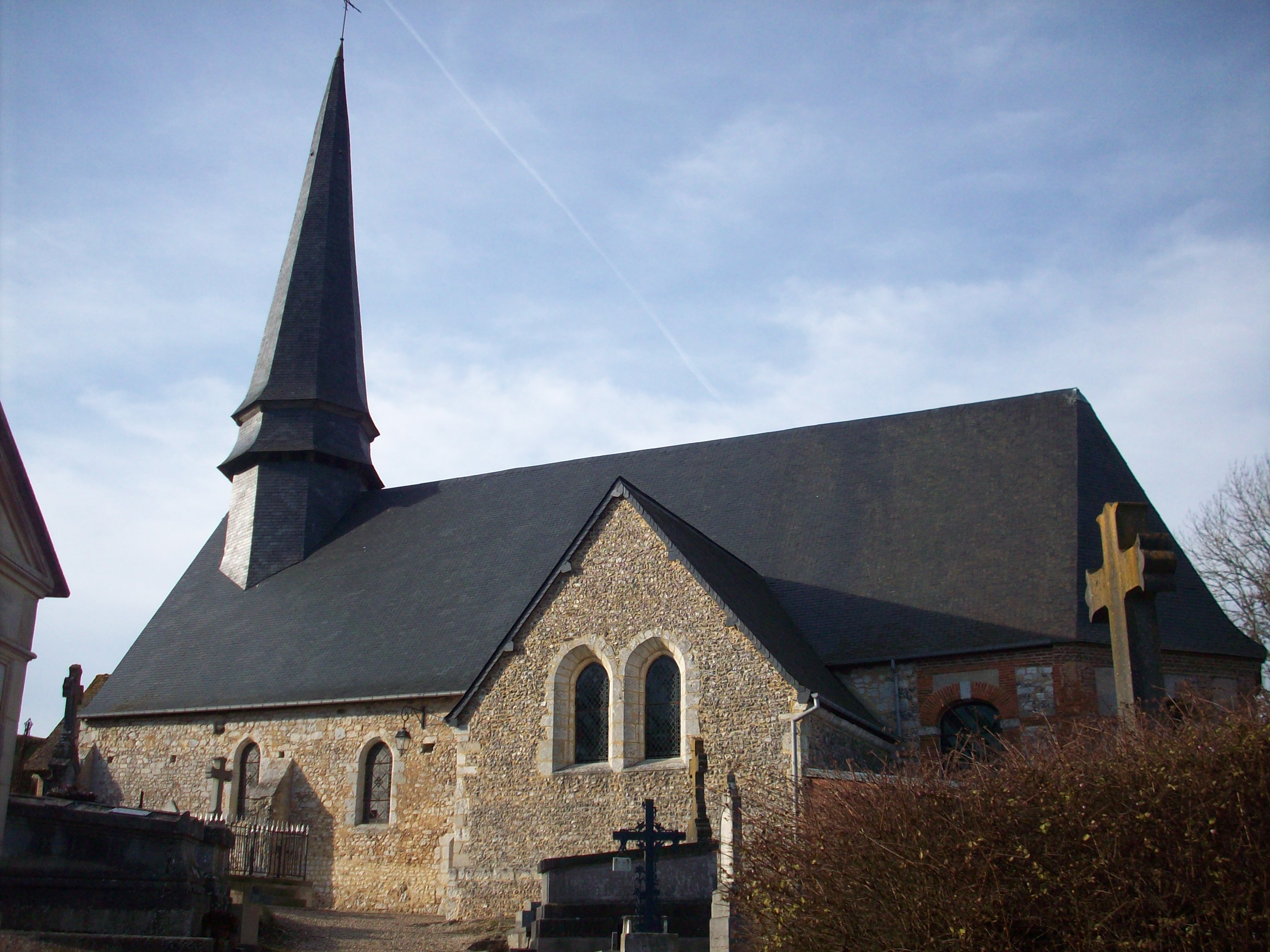
- The church in Bézu-la-Forêt
- Location of Bézu-la-Forêt
- Location within France Location within Normandy
- Coordinates: 49°24′08″N 1°37′52″E
- Country: France
- Region: Normandy
- Department: Eure
- Arrondissement: Les Andelys
- Canton: Romilly-sur-Andelle

Government
  - Mayor (2020–2026): Chantal Arvin Berod
- Area^{1}: 8.98 km^{2} (3.47 sq mi)
- Elevation: 154 m (505 ft)
- Highest elevation: 160 m (520 ft)
- Lowest elevation: 107 m (351 ft)
- Population (2023): 284
  - Density: 31.6/km^{2} (81.9/sq mi)
- Time zone: UTC+01:00 (CET)
  - Summer (DST): UTC+02:00 (CEST)
- INSEE/Postal code: 27066 /27480
- ^{1} French Land Register data, which excludes lakes, ponds, glaciers > 1 km^{2} (0.386 sq mi or 247 acres) and river estuaries.

Bézu-la-Forêt (French pronunciation: [bezy la fɔʁɛ]) is a commune in the Eure department and Normandy region of France.

== Population ==
Historical population
Year	Pop.	±% p.a.
1968	234	—
1975	182	−3.53%
1982	167	−1.22%
1990	144	−1.84%
1999	188	+3.01%
2007	214	+1.63%
2012	266	+4.45%
2017	320	+3.77%
2023	284	−1.97%
Source: INSEE

== See also ==
- Communes of the Eure department
