= Sancourt, Eure =

Sancourt
- Commune
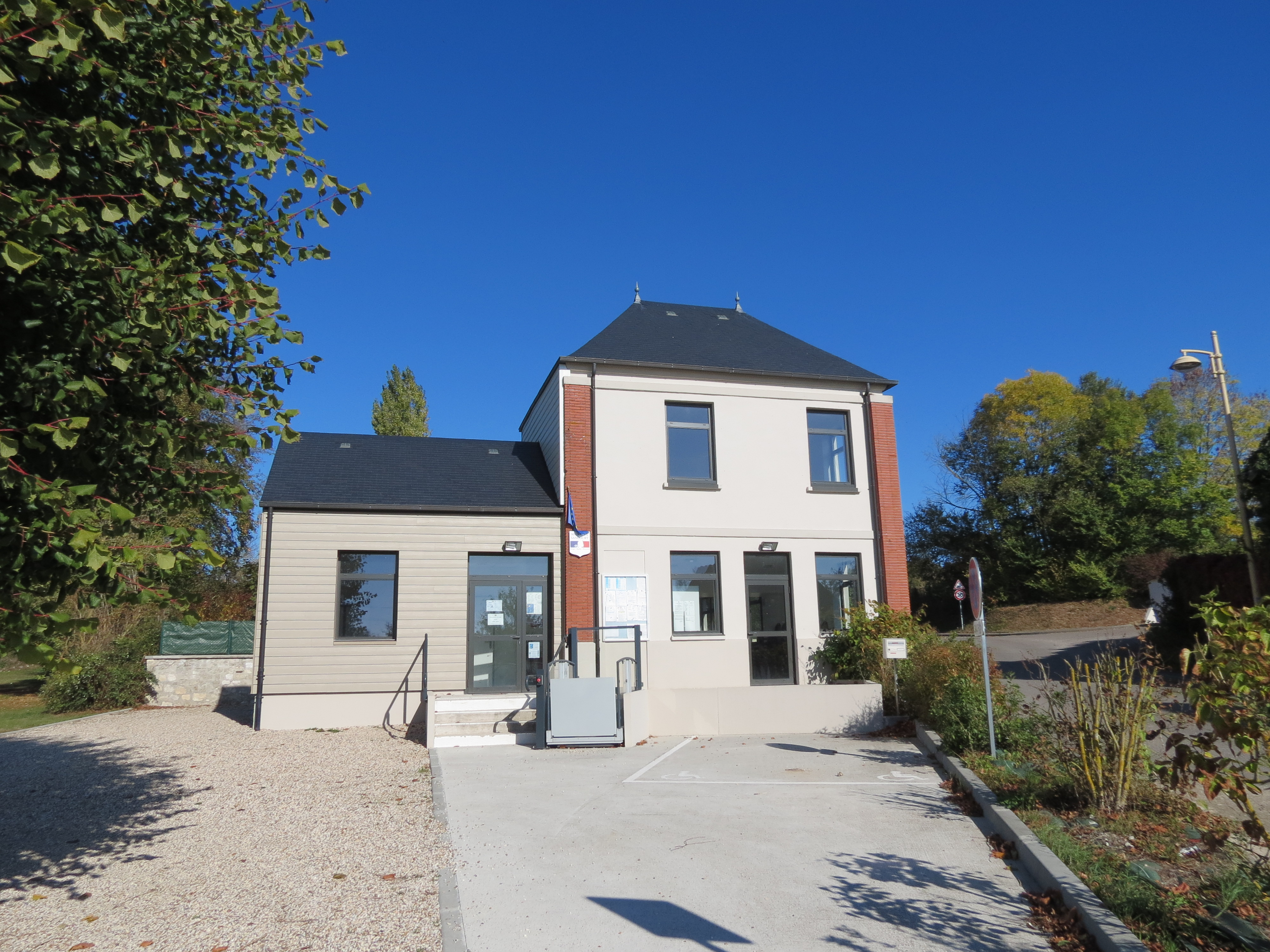
- The town hall in Sancourt
- Location of Sancourt
- Location within France Location within Normandy
- Coordinates: 49°21′18″N 1°41′13″E
- Country: France
- Region: Normandy
- Department: Eure
- Arrondissement: Les Andelys
- Canton: Gisors

Government
  - Mayor (2020–2026): Michel Dupuy
- Area^{1}: 6.63 km^{2} (2.56 sq mi)
- Elevation: 100 m (330 ft)
- Highest elevation: 128 m (420 ft)
- Lowest elevation: 77 m (253 ft)
- Population (2023): 169
  - Density: 25.5/km^{2} (66.0/sq mi)
- Time zone: UTC+01:00 (CET)
  - Summer (DST): UTC+02:00 (CEST)
- INSEE/Postal code: 27614 /27150
- ^{1} French Land Register data, which excludes lakes, ponds, glaciers > 1 km^{2} (0.386 sq mi or 247 acres) and river estuaries.

Sancourt (French pronunciation: [sɑ̃kuʁ]) is a commune in the Eure department in Normandy in northern France.

== Population ==
Historical population
Year	Pop.	±% p.a.
1968	89	—
1975	89	+0.00%
1982	96	+1.09%
1990	97	+0.13%
1999	108	+1.20%
2007	136	+2.92%
2012	165	+3.94%
2017	155	−1.24%
2023	169	+1.45%
Source: INSEE

== See also ==
- Communes of the Eure department
