= Andelle =

River in France

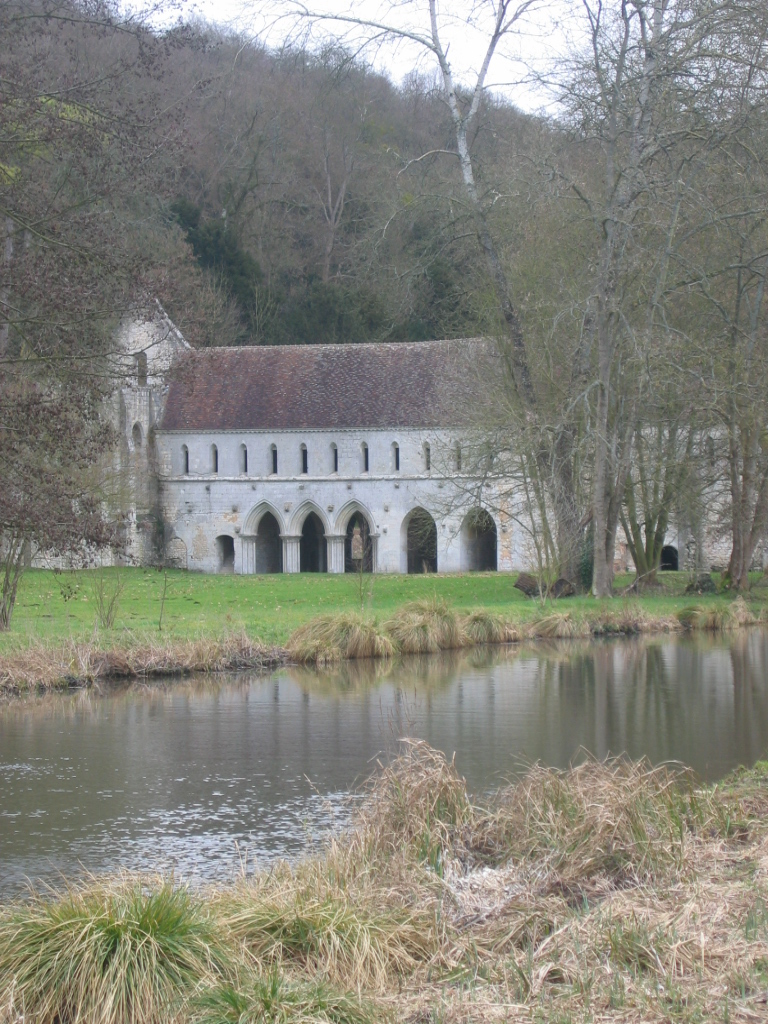
- The Andelle at Radepont

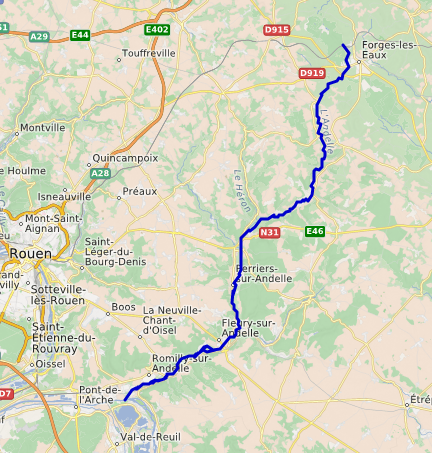

Location
- Country: France

Physical characteristics
- Source
  - location: Serqueux
  - elevation: 201 m (659 ft)
- Mouth
  - location: The Seine at Pîtres
  - coordinates: 49°18′40″N 1°13′28″E
- Length: 56.9 km (35.4 mi)
- Basin size: 740 km^{2} (290 sq mi)
- Discharge
  - average: 7.2 m^{3}/s (250 cu ft/s)

Basin features
- Progression: Seine→ English Channel

The Andelle (French pronunciation: [ɑ̃dɛl]) is a river of Normandy, France, 56.9 kilometres (35.4 mi) in length, flowing through the departments of Seine-Maritime and Eure. It is a right tributary of the Seine.

== Geography ==
The Andelle has its source in the Pays de Bray in the territory of the commune of Serqueux. Taking a southward journey, it flows through two French départements:

- In Seine-Maritime : Forges-les-Eaux, Rouvray-Catillon, Sigy-en-Bray, Nolléval, Morville-sur-Andelle, Le Héron, Elbeuf-sur-Andelle and Croisy-sur-Andelle.
- In the Eure : Vascœuil, Perruel, Perriers-sur-Andelle, Charleval, Fleury-sur-Andelle, Radepont, Douville-sur-Andelle, Pont-Saint-Pierre, Romilly-sur-Andelle and Pîtres where it joins the Seine on its right bank.

The average flow of the Andelle at Pitres, where it joins the Seine, is 7.2 m^{3} / second.

== See also ==
- French water management scheme

== Bibliography ==
- Albert Hennetier, Aux sources normandes: Promenade au fil des rivières en Seine-Maritime, Ed. Bertout, Luneray, 2006 ISBN 2867436230
