= Grainville =

- Part of Val d'Orger
- Location of Grainville
- Location within France Location within Normandy
- Coordinates: 49°20′52″N 1°22′04″E
- Country: France
- Region: Normandy
- Department: Eure
- Arrondissement: Les Andelys
- Canton: Romilly-sur-Andelle
- Commune: Val d'Orger
- Area^{1}: 3.98 km^{2} (1.54 sq mi)
- Elevation: 143 m (469 ft)
- Highest elevation: 146 m (479 ft)
- Lowest elevation: 105 m (344 ft)
- Population (2023): 545
  - Density: 137/km^{2} (355/sq mi)
- Time zone: UTC+01:00 (CET)
  - Summer (DST): UTC+02:00 (CEST)
- Postal code: 27380
- ^{1} French Land Register data, which excludes lakes, ponds, glaciers > 1 km^{2} (0.386 sq mi or 247 acres) and river estuaries.

Grainville (French pronunciation: [ɡʁɛ̃vil]) is a former commune in the Eure department in northern France. On 1 January 2017, it was merged into the new commune Val d'Orger.

== See also ==
- Communes of the Eure department
