= Gaillardbois-Cressenville =

- Part of Val d'Orger
- Coat of arms
- Location of Gaillardbois-Cressenville
- Location within France Location within Normandy
- Coordinates: 49°20′36″N 1°24′21″E
- Country: France
- Region: Normandy
- Department: Eure
- Arrondissement: Les Andelys
- Canton: Romilly-sur-Andelle
- Commune: Val d'Orger
- Area^{1}: 6.99 km^{2} (2.70 sq mi)
- Elevation: 150 m (490 ft)
- Highest elevation: 152 m (499 ft)
- Lowest elevation: 50 m (160 ft)
- Population (2023): 441
  - Density: 63.1/km^{2} (163/sq mi)
- Time zone: UTC+01:00 (CET)
  - Summer (DST): UTC+02:00 (CEST)
- Postal code: 27440
- ^{1} French Land Register data, which excludes lakes, ponds, glaciers > 1 km^{2} (0.386 sq mi or 247 acres) and river estuaries.

Gaillardbois-Cressenville (French pronunciation: [ɡajaʁbwa kʁesɑ̃vil]) is a former commune in the Eure department in northern France. On 1 January 2017, it was merged into the new commune Val d'Orger.

== See also ==
- Communes of the Eure department
