= Le Tronquay =

Le Tronquay may refer to two communes in Normandy, France:

- Le Tronquay, Calvados
- Le Tronquay, Eure
