= Elbeuf-sur-Andelle =

- Commune
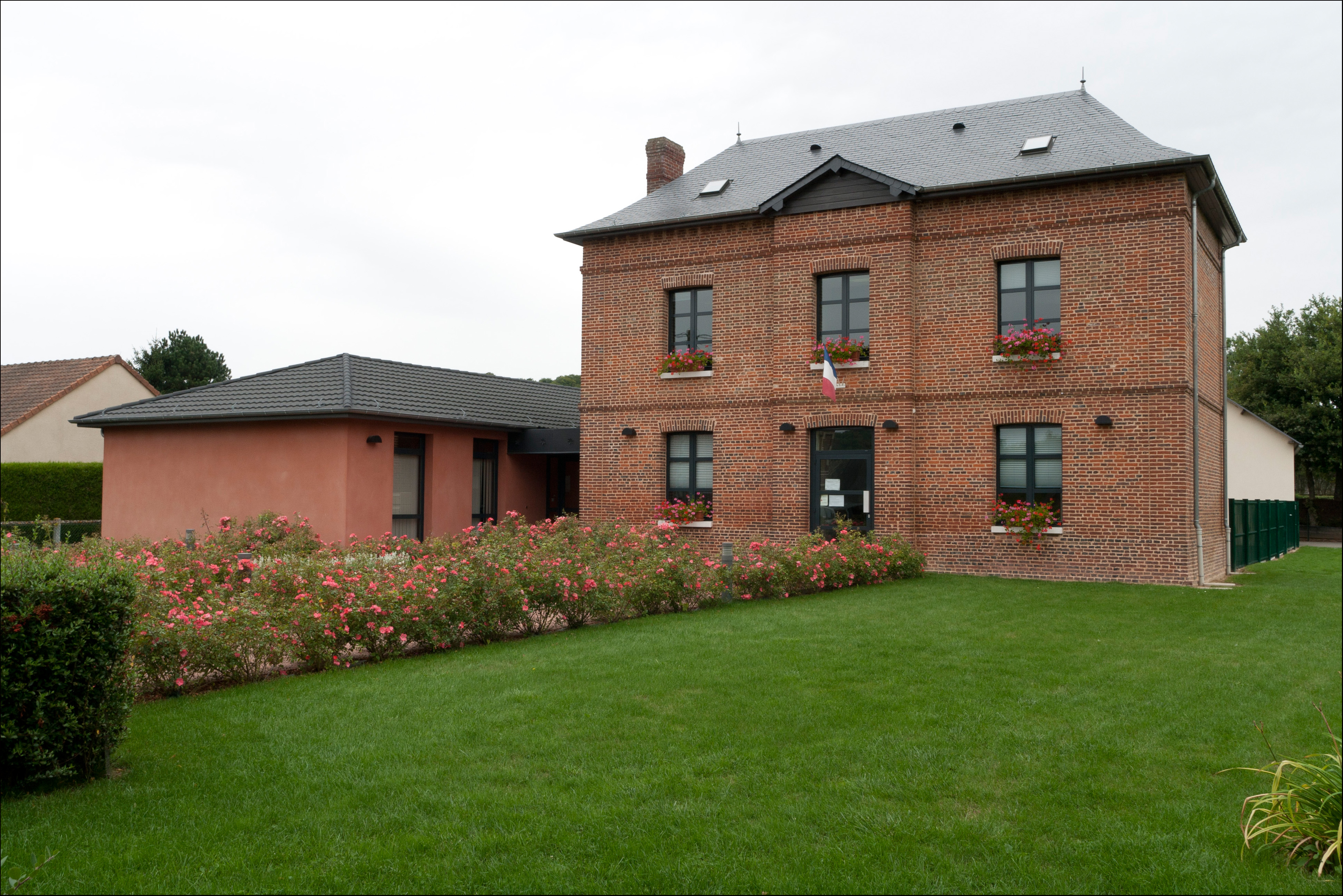
- The town hall in Elbeuf-sur-Andelle
- Location of Elbeuf-sur-Andelle
- Location within France Location within Normandy
- Coordinates: 49°28′15″N 1°23′48″E
- Country: France
- Region: Normandy
- Department: Seine-Maritime
- Arrondissement: Rouen
- Canton: Le Mesnil-Esnard

Government
  - Mayor (2020–2026): Patrick Lelouard
- Area^{1}: 5.87 km^{2} (2.27 sq mi)
- Elevation: 67 m (220 ft)
- Highest elevation: 157 m (515 ft)
- Lowest elevation: 57 m (187 ft)
- Population (2023): 431
  - Density: 73.4/km^{2} (190/sq mi)
- Time zone: UTC+01:00 (CET)
  - Summer (DST): UTC+02:00 (CEST)
- INSEE/Postal code: 76230 /76780
- ^{1} French Land Register data, which excludes lakes, ponds, glaciers > 1 km^{2} (0.386 sq mi or 247 acres) and river estuaries.

Elbeuf-sur-Andelle (French pronunciation: [ɛlbœf syʁ ɑ̃dɛl], literally Elbeuf on Andelle) is a commune in the Seine-Maritime department in the Normandy region in north-western France.

== Geography ==
A small farming village situated by the banks of the Andelle river, some 15 miles (24 km) east of Rouen at the junction of the D 13, D 46 and the D 293 roads.

== Population ==
Historical population
Year	Pop.	±% p.a.
1968	147	—
1975	127	−2.07%
1982	184	+5.44%
1990	245	+3.64%
1999	284	+1.65%
2007	373	+3.47%
2012	446	+3.64%
2017	473	+1.18%
2023	431	−1.54%
Source: INSEE

== Places of interest ==
- The church of St.Peter & Paul, dating from the nineteenth century.
- A watermill by the Héronchelles river, where it joins the Andelle.
- The chapel of Notre-Dame.

== See also ==
- Communes of the Seine-Maritime department
