= Ménesqueville =

- Commune
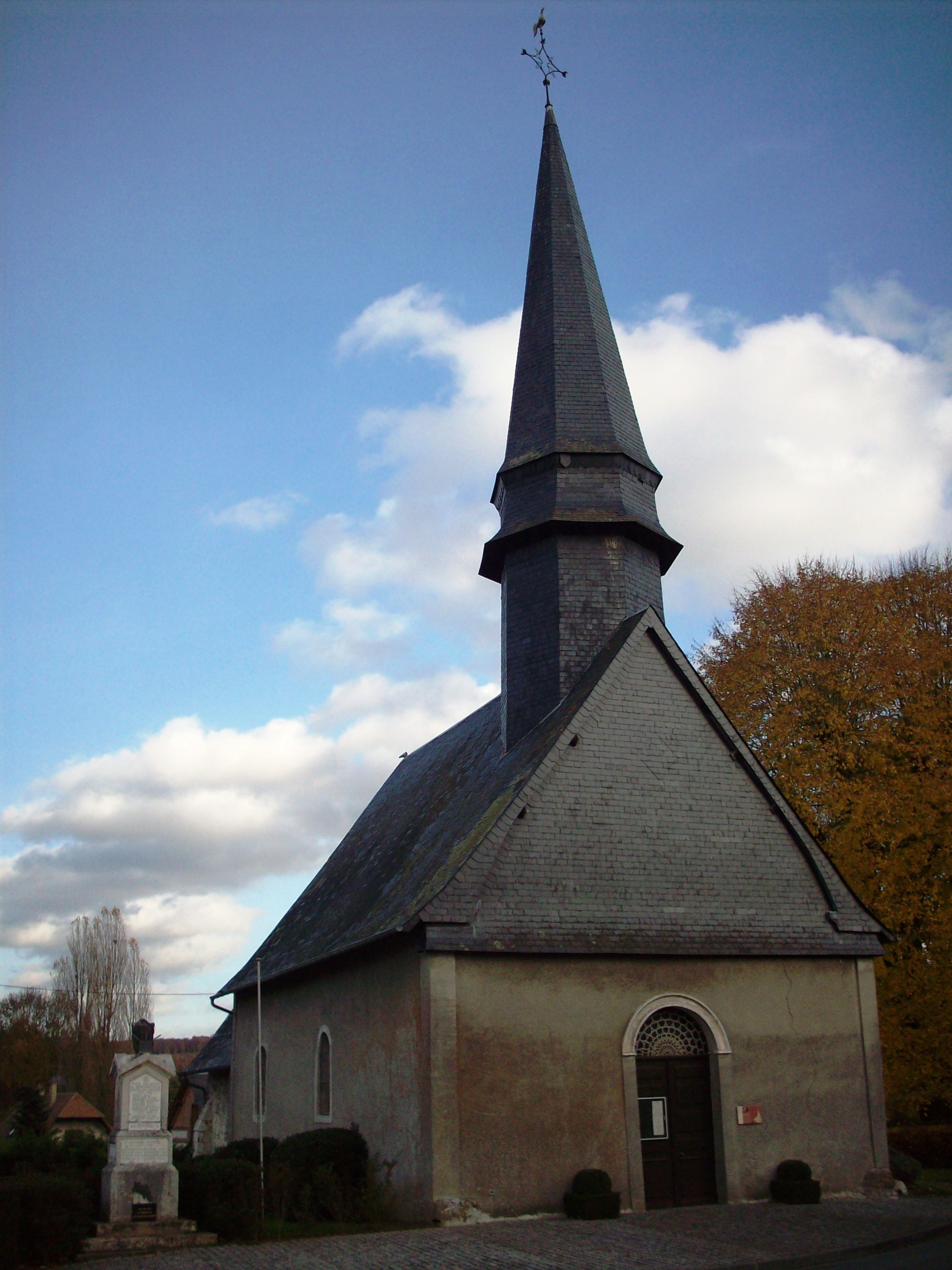
- Church of Saint-Aubin
- Location of Ménesqueville
- Location within France Location within Normandy
- Coordinates: 49°21′49″N 1°24′42″E
- Country: France
- Region: Normandy
- Department: Eure
- Arrondissement: Les Andelys
- Canton: Romilly-sur-Andelle
- Intercommunality: Lyons Andelle

Government
  - Mayor (2020–2026): Dominique Cahagne
- Area^{1}: 4.17 km^{2} (1.61 sq mi)
- Elevation: 83 m (272 ft)
- Highest elevation: 131 m (430 ft)
- Lowest elevation: 41 m (135 ft)
- Population (2023): 485
  - Density: 116/km^{2} (301/sq mi)
- Time zone: UTC+01:00 (CET)
  - Summer (DST): UTC+02:00 (CEST)
- INSEE/Postal code: 27396 /27850
- ^{1} French Land Register data, which excludes lakes, ponds, glaciers > 1 km^{2} (0.386 sq mi or 247 acres) and river estuaries.

Ménesqueville (French pronunciation: [menɛskəvil]) is a commune in the Eure department and Normandy region of north-western France.

== Population ==
Historical population
Year	Pop.	±% p.a.
1968	355	—
1975	345	−0.41%
1982	387	+1.65%
1990	358	−0.97%
1999	349	−0.28%
2007	404	+1.85%
2012	449	+2.13%
2017	465	+0.70%
2023	485	+0.70%
Source: INSEE

== See also ==
- Communes of the Eure department
