= Perriers-sur-Andelle =

- Commune
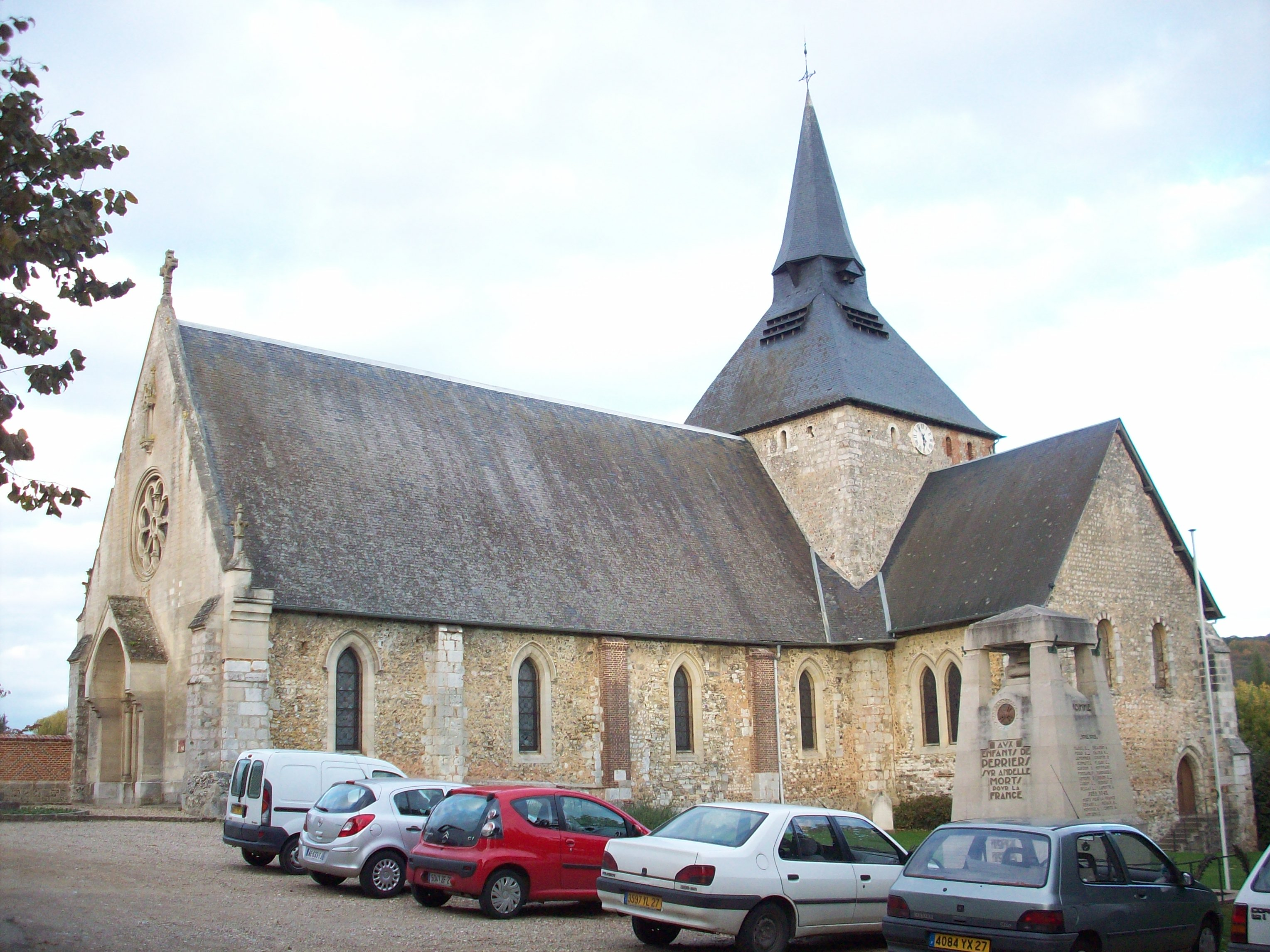
- The church in Perriers-sur-Andelle
- Location of Perriers-sur-Andelle
- Location within France Location within Normandy
- Coordinates: 49°24′53″N 1°22′20″E
- Country: France
- Region: Normandy
- Department: Eure
- Arrondissement: Les Andelys
- Canton: Romilly-sur-Andelle

Government
  - Mayor (2023–2026): Laurent Smagghe
- Area^{1}: 11.21 km^{2} (4.33 sq mi)
- Elevation: 52 m (171 ft)
- Highest elevation: 147 m (482 ft)
- Lowest elevation: 35 m (115 ft)
- Population (2023): 1,784
  - Density: 159.1/km^{2} (412.2/sq mi)
- Time zone: UTC+01:00 (CET)
  - Summer (DST): UTC+02:00 (CEST)
- INSEE/Postal code: 27453 /27910
- ^{1} French Land Register data, which excludes lakes, ponds, glaciers > 1 km^{2} (0.386 sq mi or 247 acres) and river estuaries.

Perriers-sur-Andelle (French pronunciation: [pɛʁje syʁ ɑ̃dɛl], literally Perriers on Andelle) is a commune in the Eure department in Normandy in northern France.

== Population ==
Historical population
Year	Pop.	±% p.a.
1968	1,286	—
1975	1,344	+0.63%
1982	1,685	+3.28%
1990	1,723	+0.28%
1999	1,781	+0.37%
2007	1,780	−0.01%
2012	1,842	+0.69%
2017	1,809	−0.36%
2023	1,784	−0.23%
Source: INSEE

== See also ==
- Communes of the Eure department
