= Rosay-sur-Lieure =

- Commune
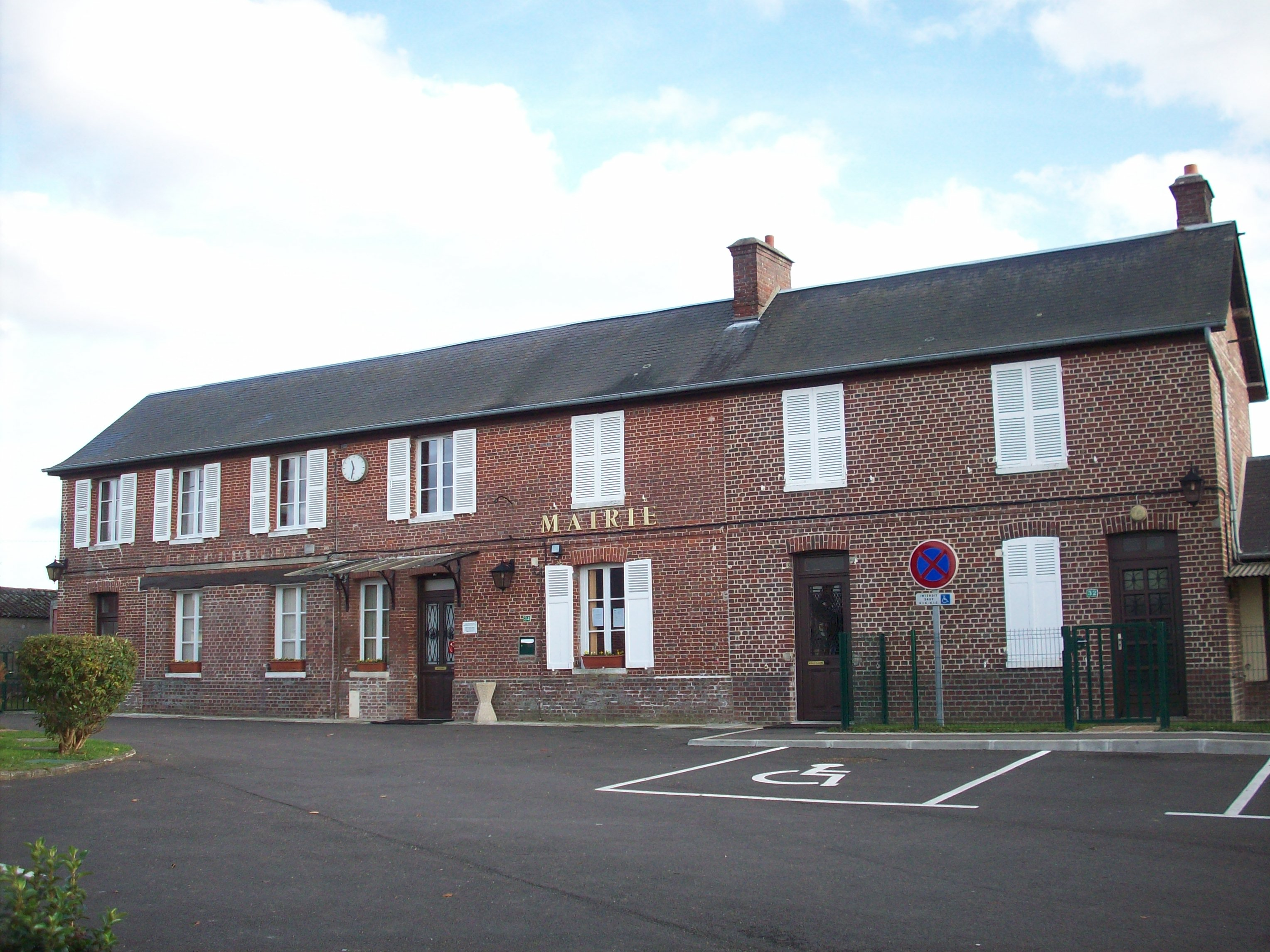
- The town house
- Location of Rosay-sur-Lieure
- Location within France Location within Normandy
- Coordinates: 49°22′26″N 1°25′52″E
- Country: France
- Region: Normandy
- Department: Eure
- Arrondissement: Les Andelys
- Canton: Romilly-sur-Andelle
- Intercommunality: Lyons Andelle

Government
  - Mayor (2020–2026): Pascal Beharel
- Area^{1}: 8.21 km^{2} (3.17 sq mi)
- Elevation: 108 m (354 ft)
- Highest elevation: 155 m (509 ft)
- Lowest elevation: 44 m (144 ft)
- Population (2023): 516
  - Density: 62.9/km^{2} (163/sq mi)
- Time zone: UTC+01:00 (CET)
  - Summer (DST): UTC+02:00 (CEST)
- INSEE/Postal code: 27496 /27790
- ^{1} French Land Register data, which excludes lakes, ponds, glaciers > 1 km^{2} (0.386 sq mi or 247 acres) and river estuaries.

Rosay-sur-Lieure (French pronunciation: [ʁozɛ syʁ ljœʁ]) is a commune in the Eure department in north-western France.

== Population ==
Historical population
Year	Pop.	±% p.a.
1968	485	—
1975	448	−1.13%
1982	443	−0.16%
1990	452	+0.25%
1999	464	+0.29%
2007	539	+1.89%
2012	553	+0.51%
2017	530	−0.85%
2023	516	−0.45%
Source: INSEE

== See also ==
- Communes of the Eure department
