= Bosquentin =

- Commune
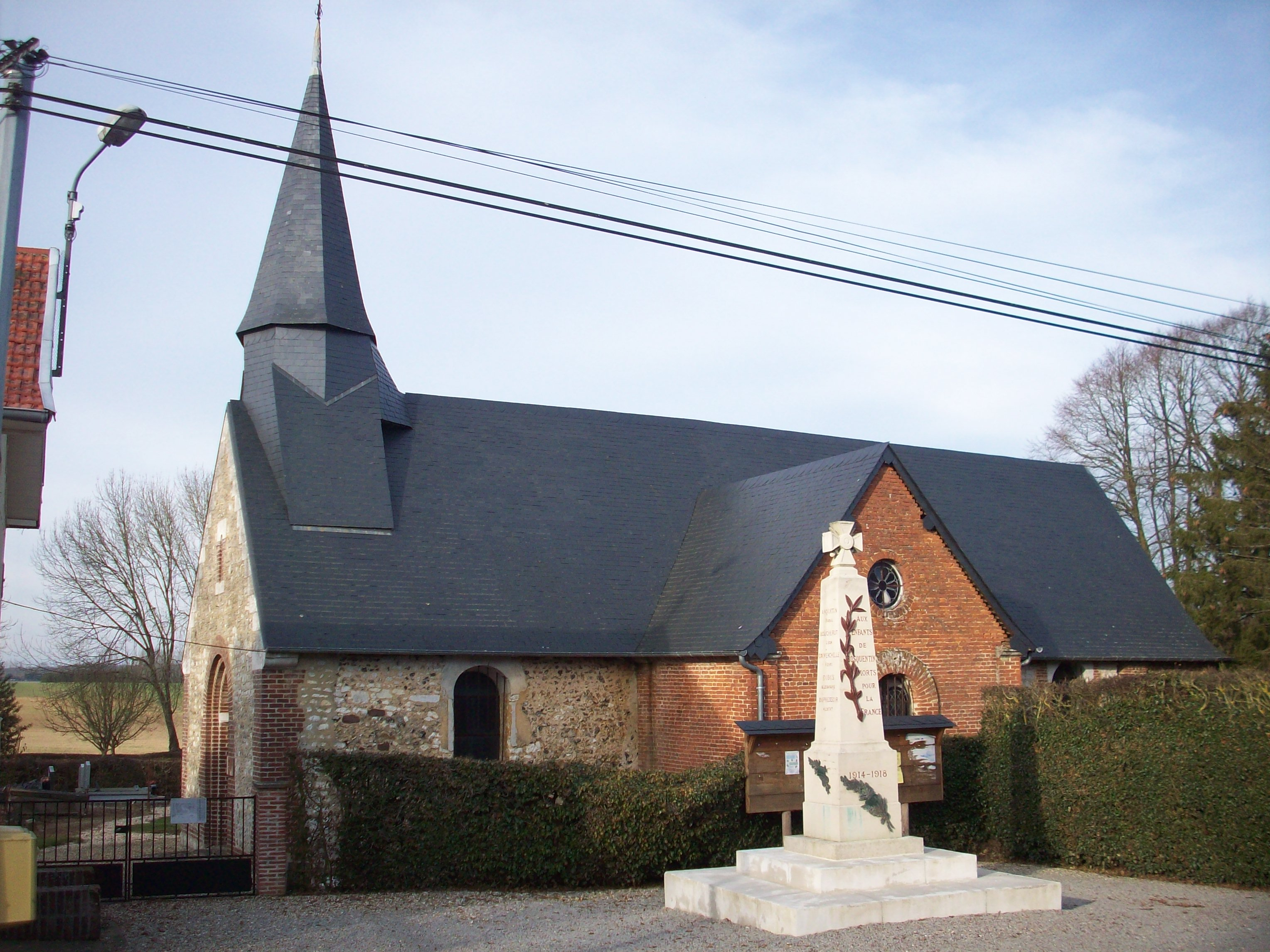
- The church and war memorial in Bosquentin
- Location of Bosquentin
- Location within France Location within Normandy
- Coordinates: 49°24′52″N 1°35′14″E
- Country: France
- Region: Normandy
- Department: Eure
- Arrondissement: Les Andelys
- Canton: Romilly-sur-Andelle
- Intercommunality: Lyons Andelle

Government
  - Mayor (2020–2026): Sylviane Fouquet
- Area^{1}: 6.9 km^{2} (2.7 sq mi)
- Elevation: 167 m (548 ft)
- Highest elevation: 172 m (564 ft)
- Lowest elevation: 132 m (433 ft)
- Population (2023): 129
  - Density: 19/km^{2} (48/sq mi)
- Time zone: UTC+01:00 (CET)
  - Summer (DST): UTC+02:00 (CEST)
- INSEE/Postal code: 27094 /27480
- ^{1} French Land Register data, which excludes lakes, ponds, glaciers > 1 km^{2} (0.386 sq mi or 247 acres) and river estuaries.

Bosquentin (French pronunciation: [bokɑ̃tɛ̃]) is a commune in the Eure department in Normandy in northern France.

== Population ==
Historical population
Year	Pop.	±% p.a.
1968	115	—
1975	89	−3.60%
1982	77	−2.05%
1990	72	−0.84%
1999	67	−0.80%
2007	87	+3.32%
2012	123	+7.17%
2017	123	+0.00%
2023	129	+0.80%
Source: INSEE

== See also ==
- Communes of the Eure department
