= Flipou =

- Commune
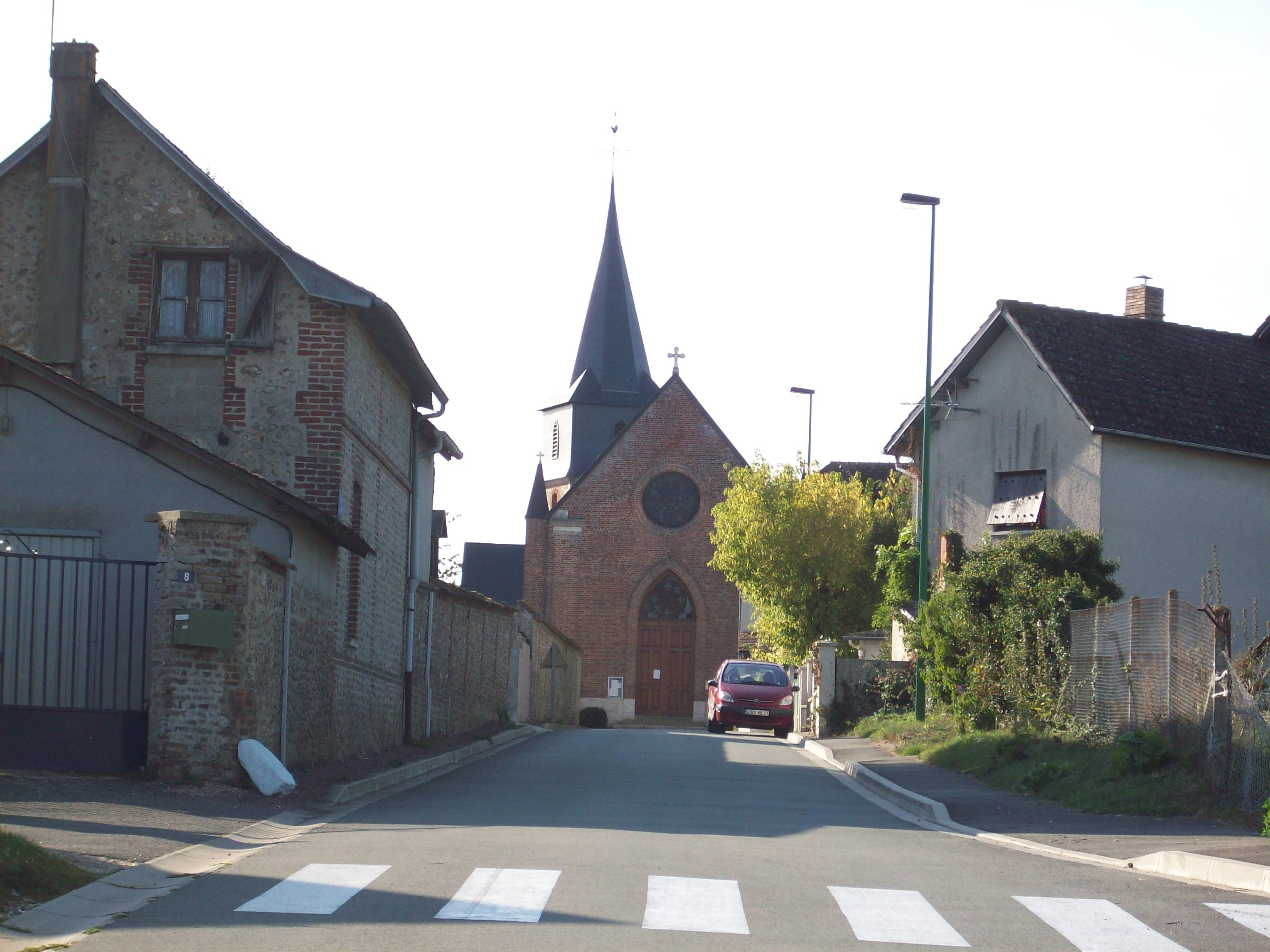
- The church in Flipou
- Location of Flipou
- Location within France Location within Normandy
- Coordinates: 49°18′55″N 1°16′48″E
- Country: France
- Region: Normandy
- Department: Eure
- Arrondissement: Les Andelys
- Canton: Romilly-sur-Andelle

Government
  - Mayor (2023–2026): Christophe Cousin
- Area^{1}: 6.97 km^{2} (2.69 sq mi)
- Elevation: 90 m (300 ft)
- Highest elevation: 157 m (515 ft)
- Lowest elevation: 25 m (82 ft)
- Population (2023): 320
  - Density: 46/km^{2} (120/sq mi)
- Time zone: UTC+01:00 (CET)
  - Summer (DST): UTC+02:00 (CEST)
- INSEE/Postal code: 27247 /27380
- ^{1} French Land Register data, which excludes lakes, ponds, glaciers > 1 km^{2} (0.386 sq mi or 247 acres) and river estuaries.

Flipou (French pronunciation: [flipu]) is a commune in the Eure department in the Normandy region in northern France.

== Population ==
Historical population
Year	Pop.	±% p.a.
1968	217	—
1975	223	+0.39%
1982	275	+3.04%
1990	310	+1.51%
1999	310	+0.00%
2007	336	+1.01%
2012	347	+0.65%
2017	324	−1.36%
2023	320	−0.21%
Source: INSEE

== See also ==
- Communes of the Eure department
