= Le Tronquay, Eure =

Le Tronquay
- Commune
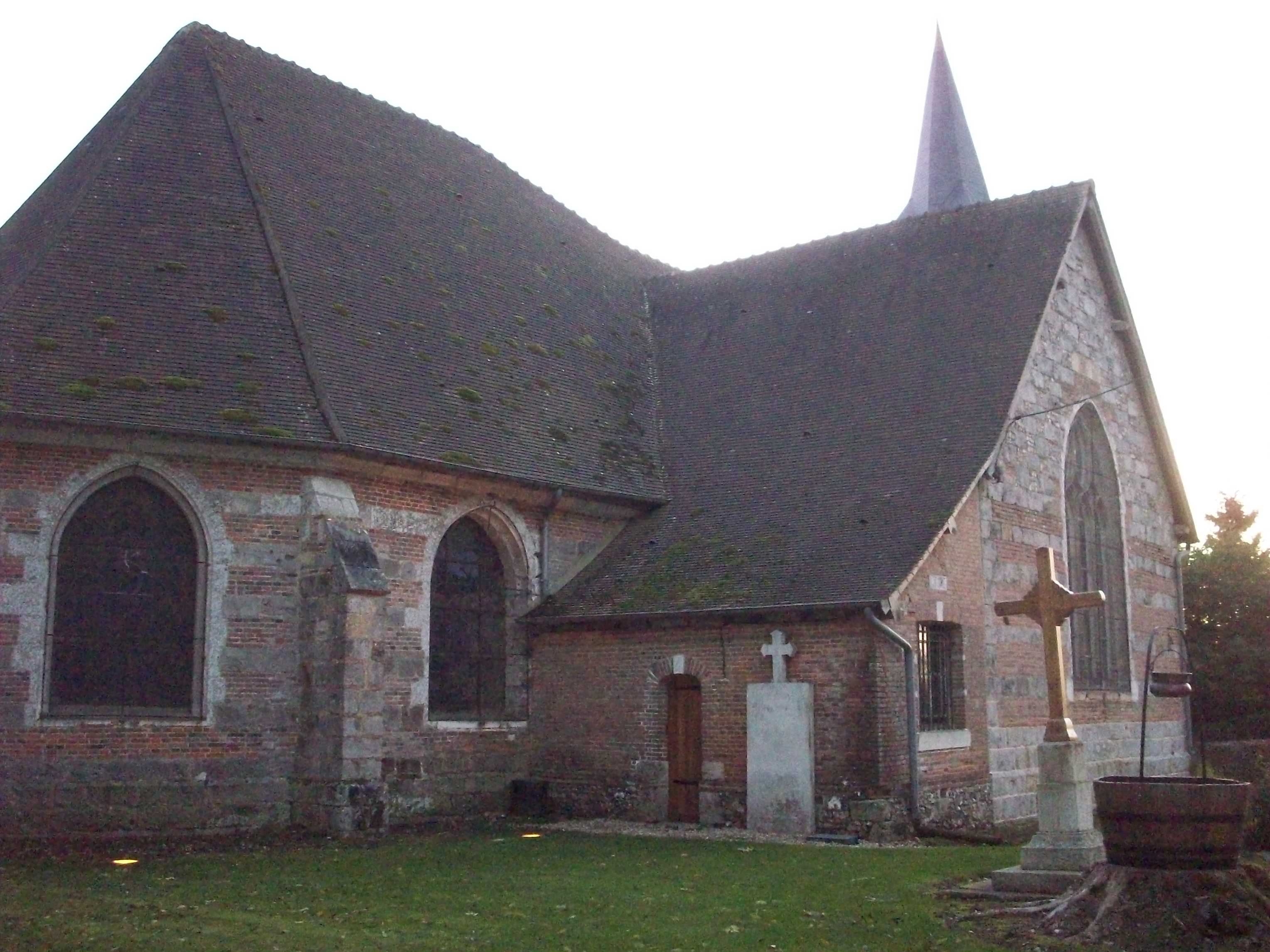
- The church in Le Tronquay
- Location of Le Tronquay
- Location within France Location within Normandy
- Coordinates: 49°25′37″N 1°28′46″E
- Country: France
- Region: Normandy
- Department: Eure
- Arrondissement: Les Andelys
- Canton: Romilly-sur-Andelle

Government
  - Mayor (2020–2026): Dominique Drony
- Area^{1}: 19.06 km^{2} (7.36 sq mi)
- Elevation: 155 m (509 ft)
- Highest elevation: 179 m (587 ft)
- Lowest elevation: 85 m (279 ft)
- Population (2023): 530
  - Density: 28/km^{2} (72/sq mi)
- Time zone: UTC+01:00 (CET)
  - Summer (DST): UTC+02:00 (CEST)
- INSEE/Postal code: 27664 /27480
- ^{1} French Land Register data, which excludes lakes, ponds, glaciers > 1 km^{2} (0.386 sq mi or 247 acres) and river estuaries.

Le Tronquay (French pronunciation: [lə tʁɔ̃kɛ]) is a commune in the Eure department in Normandy in northern France. It is located in the forest of Lyons, 100 km from Paris and 30 km from Rouen. The village has two primary schools. The commune of Le Tronquay includes the localities Les Cornets, La Grand Fray, La Motte, Le Fresnay, and Les Landez, and notable farms are Les Callouettes, Les Brûlins, Le Bâtiment, and La Garenne.

== History ==
Le Tronquay was first mentioned in the 12th century. The name Tronquay is probably related to the word tronc meaning "trunk". In 1787, the commune Les Hogues was separated from the territory of Le Tronquay.

== Population ==
Historical population
Year	Pop.	±% p.a.
1968	392	—
1975	403	+0.40%
1982	372	−1.14%
1990	410	+1.22%
1999	391	−0.53%
2007	474	+2.44%
2012	500	+1.07%
2017	511	+0.44%
2023	530	+0.61%
Source: INSEE

== Personalities ==
- Pierre Guarin, benedictine monk, who published works on Hebrew grammar
- Nicolas Brémontier (1738 in Tronquay - 1809 in Paris)- a general inspector of the départmental routes. He was the first in France who applied plantations of maritime pines in order to fixate moving sand dunes.

== See also ==
- Le Tronquay, Calvados
- Communes of the Eure department
