= Douville-sur-Andelle =

- Commune
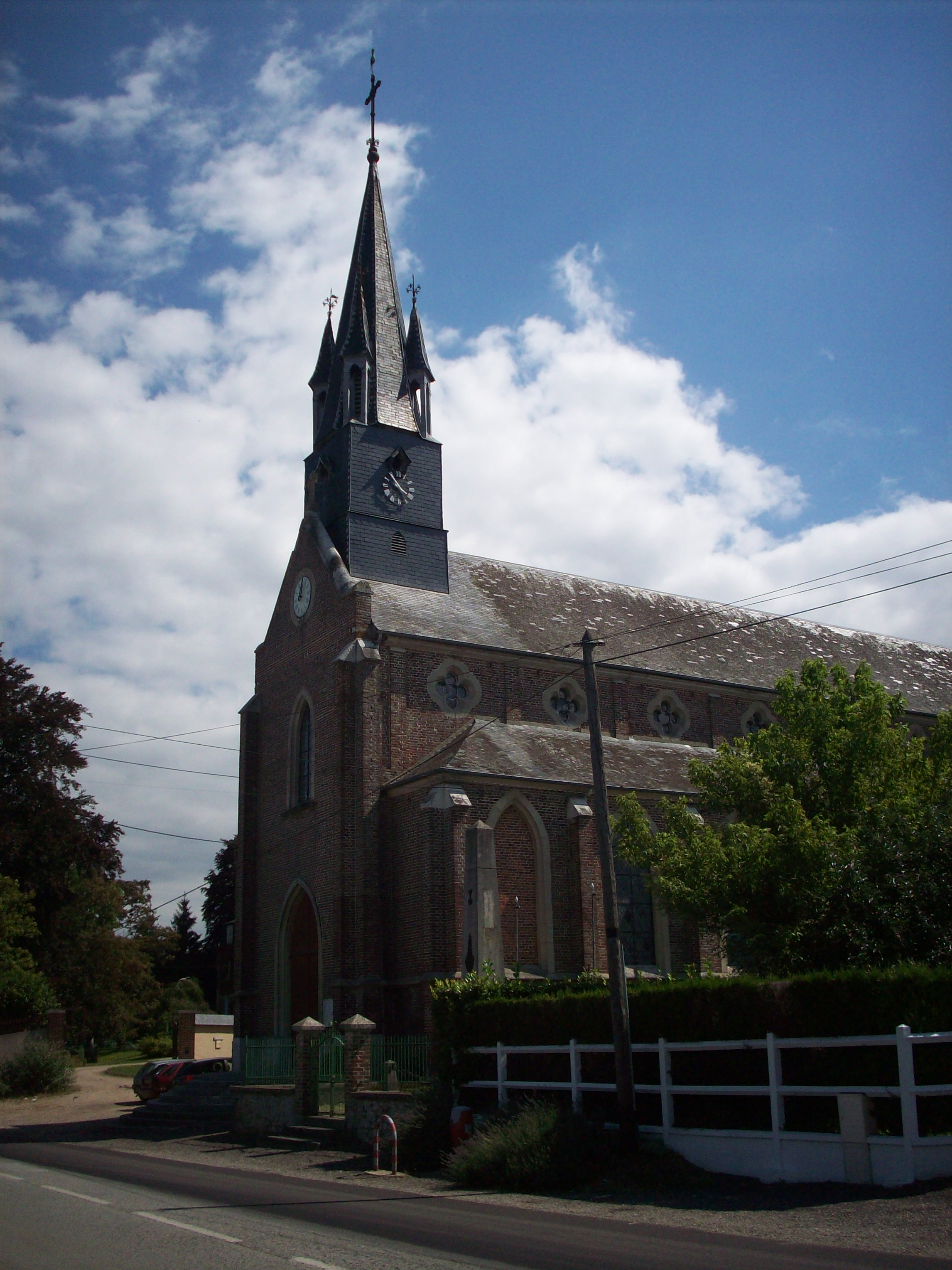
- The church in Douville-sur-Andelle

- Coat of arms
- Location of Douville-sur-Andelle
- Location within France Location within Normandy
- Coordinates: 49°20′22″N 1°18′01″E
- Country: France
- Region: Normandy
- Department: Eure
- Arrondissement: Les Andelys
- Canton: Romilly-sur-Andelle

Government
  - Mayor (2020–2026): Michel Cramer
- Area^{1}: 4.51 km^{2} (1.74 sq mi)
- Elevation: 20 m (66 ft)
- Highest elevation: 146 m (479 ft)
- Lowest elevation: 15 m (49 ft)
- Population (2023): 413
  - Density: 91.6/km^{2} (237/sq mi)
- Time zone: UTC+01:00 (CET)
  - Summer (DST): UTC+02:00 (CEST)
- INSEE/Postal code: 27205 /27380
- ^{1} French Land Register data, which excludes lakes, ponds, glaciers > 1 km^{2} (0.386 sq mi or 247 acres) and river estuaries.

Douville-sur-Andelle (French pronunciation: [duvil syʁ ɑ̃dɛl], literally Douville on Andelle) is a commune in the Eure department in northern France.

== Population ==
Historical population
Year	Pop.	±% p.a.
1968	426	—
1975	377	−1.73%
1982	390	+0.49%
1990	355	−1.17%
1999	305	−1.67%
2007	400	+3.45%
2012	430	+1.46%
2017	446	+0.73%
2023	413	−1.27%
Source: INSEE

== See also ==
- Communes of the Eure department
