= Mesnil-sous-Vienne =

- Commune
- Location of Mesnil-sous-Vienne
- Location within France Location within Normandy
- Coordinates: 49°23′12″N 1°40′05″E
- Country: France
- Region: Normandy
- Department: Eure
- Arrondissement: Les Andelys
- Canton: Romilly-sur-Andelle

Government
  - Mayor (2020–2026): Ludovic Dubos
- Area^{1}: 5.72 km^{2} (2.21 sq mi)
- Elevation: 144 m (472 ft)
- Highest elevation: 176 m (577 ft)
- Lowest elevation: 91 m (299 ft)
- Population (2023): 102
  - Density: 17.8/km^{2} (46.2/sq mi)
- Time zone: UTC+01:00 (CET)
  - Summer (DST): UTC+02:00 (CEST)
- INSEE/Postal code: 27405 /27150
- ^{1} French Land Register data, which excludes lakes, ponds, glaciers > 1 km^{2} (0.386 sq mi or 247 acres) and river estuaries.

Mesnil-sous-Vienne (French pronunciation: [mɛnil su vjɛn]) is a commune in the Eure department in Normandy in northern France.

== Population ==
Historical population
Year	Pop.	±% p.a.
1968	87	—
1975	84	−0.50%
1982	62	−4.25%
1990	83	+3.71%
1999	92	+1.15%
2007	129	+4.32%
2012	125	−0.63%
2017	110	−2.52%
2023	102	−1.25%
Source: INSEE

== See also ==
- Communes of the Eure department
