= Beauficel-en-Lyons =

- Commune
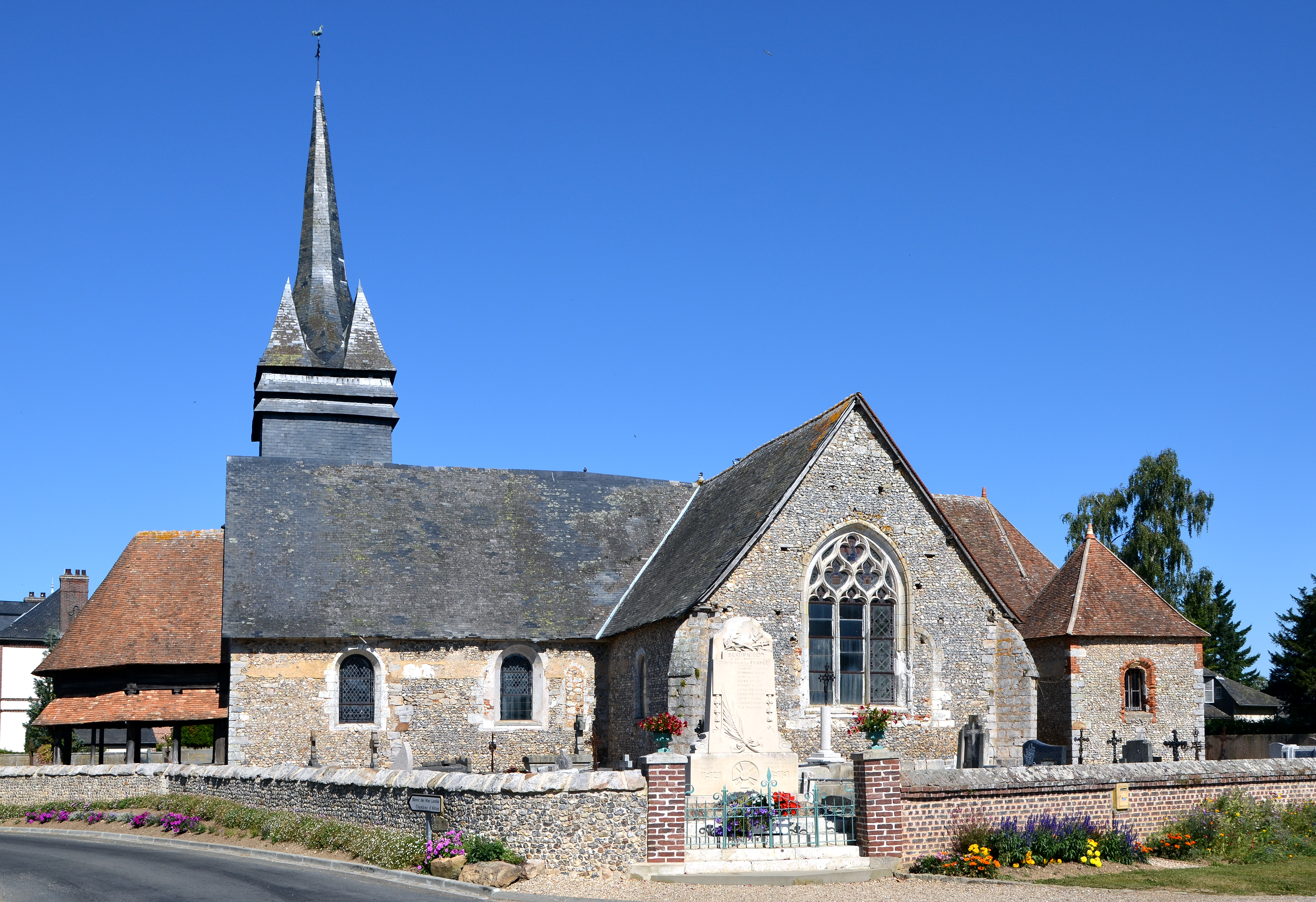
- The church in Beauficel-en-Lyons
- Location of Beauficel-en-Lyons
- Location within France Location within Normandy
- Coordinates: 49°24′29″N 1°31′25″E
- Country: France
- Region: Normandy
- Department: Eure
- Arrondissement: Les Andelys
- Canton: Romilly-sur-Andelle

Government
  - Mayor (2020–2026): Yves Pillet
- Area^{1}: 7.2 km^{2} (2.8 sq mi)
- Elevation: 163 m (535 ft)
- Highest elevation: 163 m (535 ft)
- Lowest elevation: 113 m (371 ft)
- Population (2023): 218
  - Density: 30/km^{2} (78/sq mi)
- Time zone: UTC+01:00 (CET)
  - Summer (DST): UTC+02:00 (CEST)
- INSEE/Postal code: 27048 /27480
- ^{1} French Land Register data, which excludes lakes, ponds, glaciers > 1 km^{2} (0.386 sq mi or 247 acres) and river estuaries.

Beauficel-en-Lyons is a commune in the Eure department in Normandy in northern France.

== Population ==
Historical population
| Year | Pop. | ±% p.a. |
|---|---|---|
| 1968 | 147 | — |
| 1975 | 128 | −1.96% |
| 1982 | 136 | +0.87% |
| 1990 | 150 | +1.23% |
| 1999 | 185 | +2.36% |
| 2007 | 171 | −0.98% |
| 2012 | 189 | +2.02% |
| 2017 | 188 | −0.11% |
| 2023 | 218 | +2.50% |
Source: INSEE

== See also ==
- Communes of the Eure department
