= Bourg-Beaudouin =

- Commune
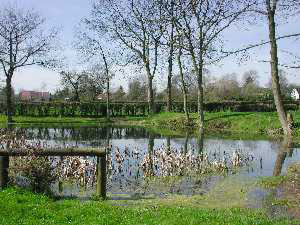
- The lake in Bourg-Beaudouin
- Location of Bourg-Beaudouin
- Location within France Location within Normandy
- Coordinates: 49°23′13″N 1°18′28″E
- Country: France
- Region: Normandy
- Department: Eure
- Arrondissement: Les Andelys
- Canton: Romilly-sur-Andelle

Government
  - Mayor (2020–2026): Philippe Halot
- Area^{1}: 5.33 km^{2} (2.06 sq mi)
- Elevation: 135 m (443 ft)
- Highest elevation: 155 m (509 ft)
- Lowest elevation: 89 m (292 ft)
- Population (2023): 741
  - Density: 139/km^{2} (360/sq mi)
- Time zone: UTC+01:00 (CET)
  - Summer (DST): UTC+02:00 (CEST)
- INSEE/Postal code: 27104 /27380
- ^{1} French Land Register data, which excludes lakes, ponds, glaciers > 1 km^{2} (0.386 sq mi or 247 acres) and river estuaries.

Bourg-Beaudouin (French pronunciation: [buʁ bodwɛ̃]) is a commune in the Eure department in Normandy in northern France.

== Population ==
Historical population
Year	Pop.	±% p.a.
1968	323	—
1975	343	+0.86%
1982	446	+3.82%
1990	624	+4.29%
1999	675	+0.88%
2007	733	+1.04%
2012	747	+0.38%
2017	708	−1.07%
2023	741	+0.76%
Source: INSEE

== See also ==
- Communes of the Eure department
