= Radepont =

- Commune
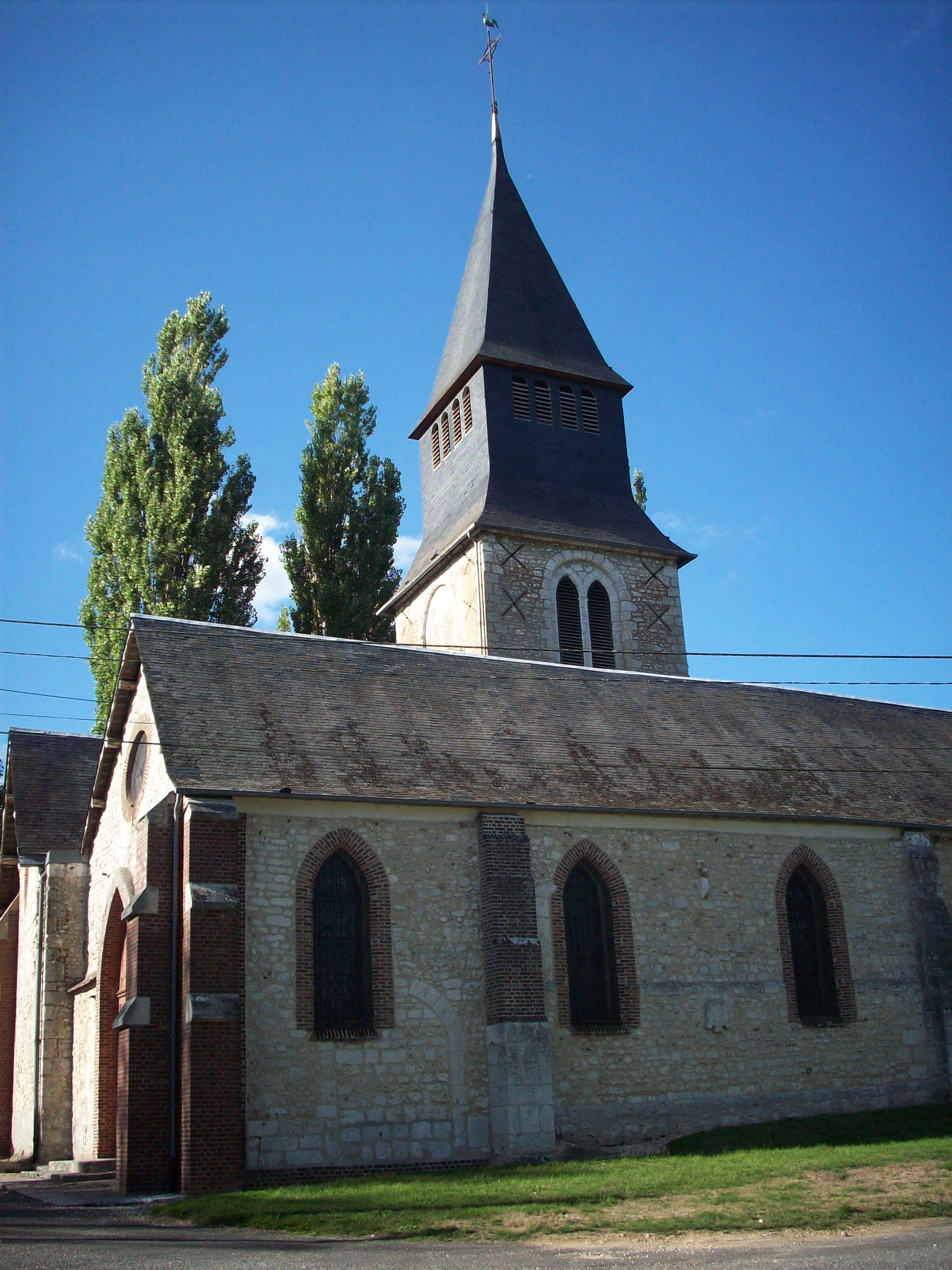
- The church in Radepont
- Location of Radepont
- Location within France Location within Normandy
- Coordinates: 49°21′07″N 1°19′45″E
- Country: France
- Region: Normandy
- Department: Eure
- Arrondissement: Les Andelys
- Canton: Romilly-sur-Andelle
- Intercommunality: Lyons Andelle

Government
  - Mayor (2020–2026): Patrick Minier
- Area^{1}: 15.81 km^{2} (6.10 sq mi)
- Elevation: 33 m (108 ft)
- Highest elevation: 156 m (512 ft)
- Lowest elevation: 18 m (59 ft)
- Population (2023): 639
  - Density: 40.4/km^{2} (105/sq mi)
- Time zone: UTC+01:00 (CET)
  - Summer (DST): UTC+02:00 (CEST)
- INSEE/Postal code: 27487 /27380
- ^{1} French Land Register data, which excludes lakes, ponds, glaciers > 1 km^{2} (0.386 sq mi or 247 acres) and river estuaries.

Radepont (French pronunciation: [ʁadpɔ̃]) is a commune in the Eure department in Normandy, northern France.

It is located 22 km south east of Rouen, on the river Andelle.

== History ==
Radepont's monuments include the chateau de Radepont and the ruined Cistercian abbey of Notre-Dame de Fontaine-Guerard

The abbey was founded in 1185 by Robert III de Beaumont. In the 12th century Radepont passed from the ownership of the Abbey of Les Préaux to Robert du Plessis. In 1194, Richard the Lion Heart had a castle built on this land.

== Population ==
Historical population
Year	Pop.	±% p.a.
1968	739	—
1975	691	−0.95%
1982	647	−0.94%
1990	737	+1.64%
1999	710	−0.41%
2007	760	+0.85%
2012	684	−2.09%
2017	657	−0.80%
2023	639	−0.46%
Source: INSEE

== See also ==
- Communes of the Eure department
