= Vandrimare =

- Commune
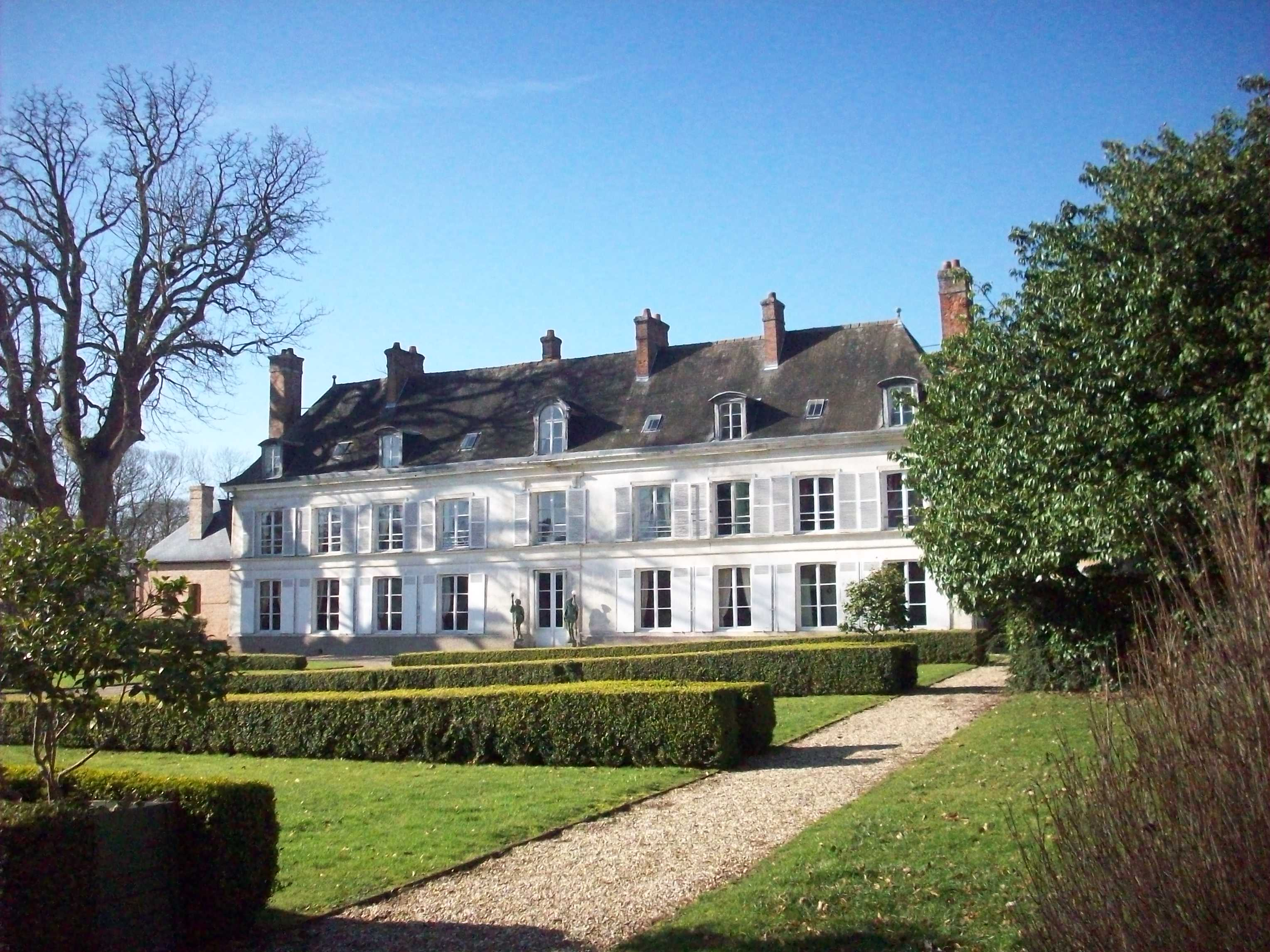
- The château of Vandrimare

- Coat of arms
- Location of Vandrimare
- Location within France Location within Normandy
- Coordinates: 49°22′50″N 1°20′39″E
- Country: France
- Region: Normandy
- Department: Eure
- Arrondissement: Les Andelys
- Canton: Romilly-sur-Andelle

Government
  - Mayor (2020–2026): Pierre Dechoz
- Area^{1}: 6.48 km^{2} (2.50 sq mi)
- Elevation: 124 m (407 ft)
- Highest elevation: 141 m (463 ft)
- Lowest elevation: 45 m (148 ft)
- Population (2023): 969
  - Density: 150/km^{2} (387/sq mi)
- Time zone: UTC+01:00 (CET)
  - Summer (DST): UTC+02:00 (CEST)
- INSEE/Postal code: 27670 /27380
- ^{1} French Land Register data, which excludes lakes, ponds, glaciers > 1 km^{2} (0.386 sq mi or 247 acres) and river estuaries.

Vandrimare (French pronunciation: [vɑ̃dʁimaʁ]) is a commune in the Eure department in Normandy in northern France.

== Population ==
Historical population
Year	Pop.	±% p.a.
1968	427	—
1975	516	+2.74%
1982	660	+3.58%
1990	773	+2.00%
1999	864	+1.24%
2007	1,014	+2.02%
2012	1,006	−0.16%
2017	959	−0.95%
2023	969	+0.17%
Source: INSEE

== See also ==
- Communes of the Eure department
