= Nolléval =

- Commune
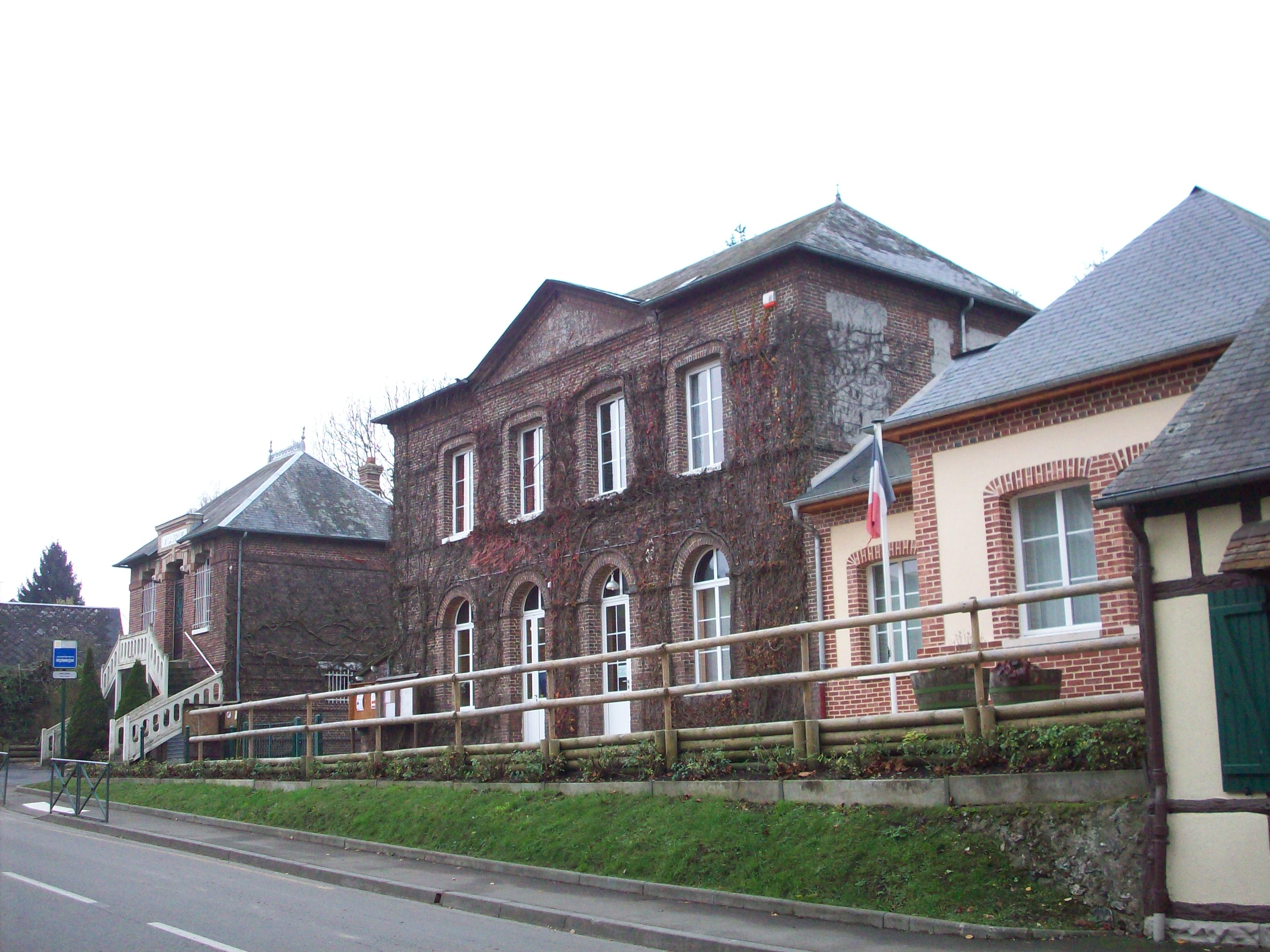
- The town hall in Nolléval

- Coat of arms
- Location of Nolléval
- Location within France Location within Normandy
- Coordinates: 49°29′41″N 1°28′56″E
- Country: France
- Region: Normandy
- Department: Seine-Maritime
- Arrondissement: Dieppe
- Canton: Gournay-en-Bray
- Intercommunality: CC 4 rivières

Government
  - Mayor (2026–32): Karine Lemoine
- Area^{1}: 9.93 km^{2} (3.83 sq mi)
- Elevation: 82 m (269 ft)
- Highest elevation: 206 m (676 ft)
- Lowest elevation: 71 m (233 ft)
- Population (2023): 417
  - Density: 42.0/km^{2} (109/sq mi)
- Time zone: UTC+01:00 (CET)
  - Summer (DST): UTC+02:00 (CEST)
- INSEE/Postal code: 76469 /76780
- ^{1} French Land Register data, which excludes lakes, ponds, glaciers > 1 km^{2} (0.386 sq mi or 247 acres) and river estuaries.

Nolléval (French pronunciation: [nɔleval]) is a commune in the Seine-Maritime department in the Normandy region in north-western France.

== Geography ==
A forestry and farming village situated by the banks of the river Andelle in the Pays de Bray, at the junction of the D 921, D 38 and D 262 roads, some 16 miles (26 km) east of Rouen.

== Population ==
Historical population
Year	Pop.	±% p.a.
1968	412	—
1975	402	−0.35%
1982	347	−2.08%
1990	335	−0.44%
1999	303	−1.11%
2007	400	+3.53%
2012	431	+1.50%
2017	447	+0.73%
2023	417	−1.15%
Source: INSEE

== Places of interest ==
- The church of St. Aubin, dating from the thirteenth century.
- The church of St.Martin, at the hamlet of Boulay, dating from the seventeenth century.
- The thirteenth century chapel at Montagny.

== See also ==
- Communes of the Seine-Maritime department
