= Pierre Guarin =

French Hebraist

- Born: 1678; Le Tronquay
- Died: 29 December 1729 (aged 50–51); Saint-Germain-des-Prés
- Occupation: Librarian, Hebraist

Pierre Guarin (1678 – 29 December 1729) was a French Hebraist. He was born at Le Tronquay, Province of Normandy, in 1678. He entered the order of the Benedictines of St. Maur on 21 October 1696, became subsequently professor of Greek and Hebrew, and died librarian of the abbey of St. Germain des Pros on 29 December 1729.

He had a lively literary controversy with canon François Masclef, and wrote Grammatica Hebraica et Chal-deice, etc. (Paris, 1724 8, 2 vols. 4to) : — Lexicon Hebra-icum et Chaldaeobiblicum (Par. 1746, 2 vols. 4to). Guapin only completed this dictionary to Mere inclusively; the following letters were the work of other Benedictines.
