= Val d'Orger =

- Commune
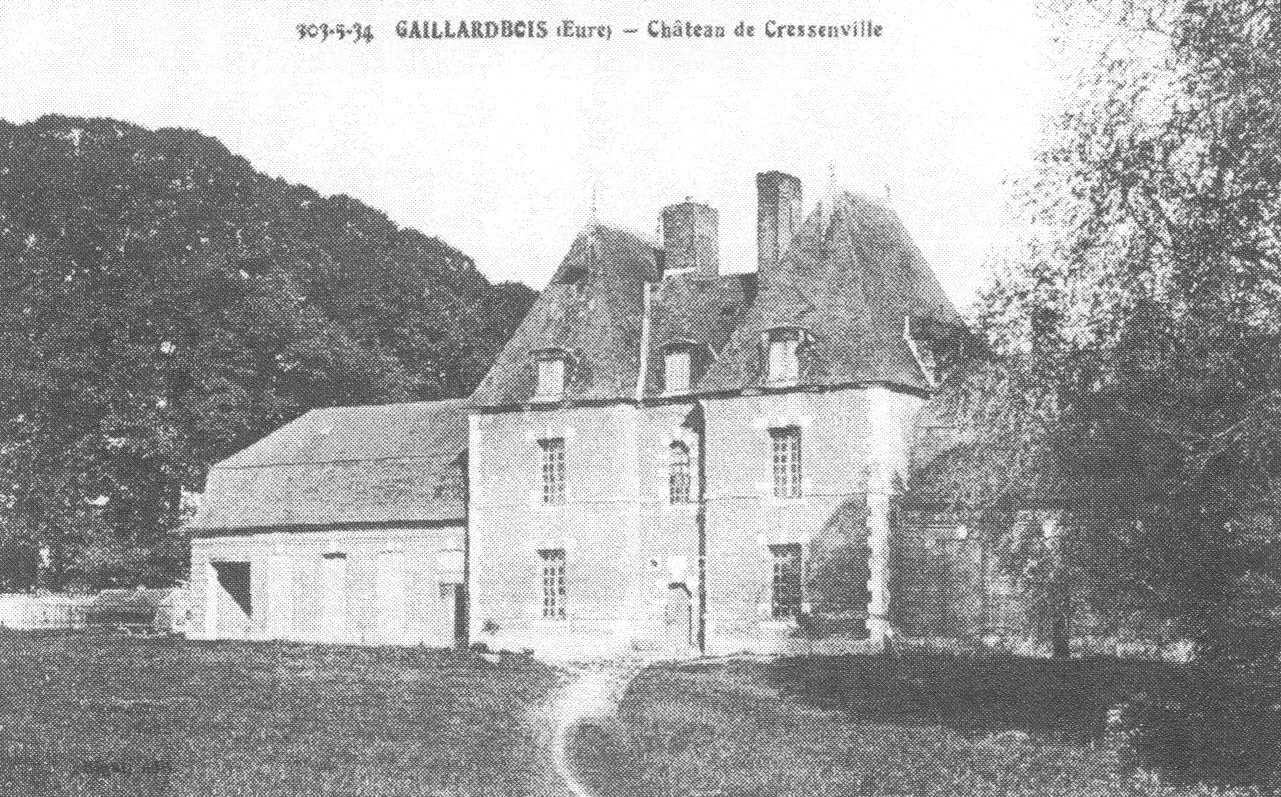
- Location of Val d'Orger
- Location within France Location within Normandy
- Coordinates: 49°20′53″N 1°22′05″E
- Country: France
- Region: Normandy
- Department: Eure
- Arrondissement: Les Andelys
- Canton: Romilly-sur-Andelle
- Intercommunality: Lyons Andelle

Government
  - Mayor (2020–2026): Daniel Blavette
- Area^{1}: 10.97 km^{2} (4.24 sq mi)
- Population (2023): 986
  - Density: 89.9/km^{2} (233/sq mi)
- Time zone: UTC+01:00 (CET)
  - Summer (DST): UTC+02:00 (CEST)
- INSEE/Postal code: 27294 /27380, 27440
- ^{1} French Land Register data, which excludes lakes, ponds, glaciers > 1 km^{2} (0.386 sq mi or 247 acres) and river estuaries.

Val d'Orger (French pronunciation: [val dɔʁʒe]) is a commune in the department of Eure, northern France. The municipality was established on 1 January 2017 by merger of the former communes of Grainville (the seat) and Gaillardbois-Cressenville.

== See also ==
- Communes of the Eure department
