= Bouchevilliers =

- Commune
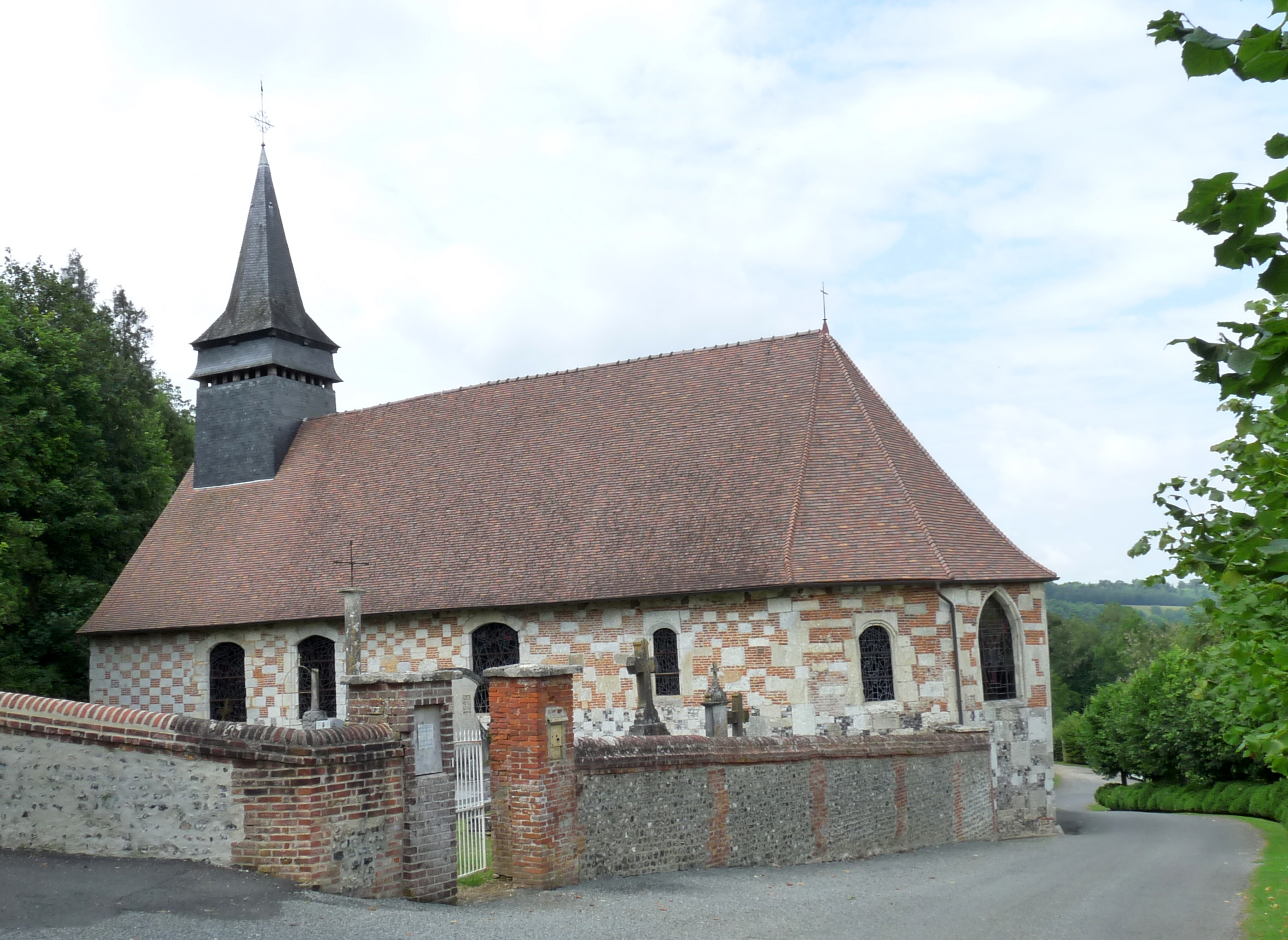
- The church in Bouchevilliers
- Location of Bouchevilliers
- Location within France Location within Normandy
- Coordinates: 49°24′14″N 1°42′56″E
- Country: France
- Region: Normandy
- Department: Eure
- Arrondissement: Les Andelys
- Canton: Romilly-sur-Andelle
- Intercommunality: CC 4 rivières

Government
  - Mayor (2020–2026): Emmanuel Broux
- Area^{1}: 4.31 km^{2} (1.66 sq mi)
- Elevation: 81 m (266 ft)
- Highest elevation: 195 m (640 ft)
- Lowest elevation: 73 m (240 ft)
- Population (2023): 70
  - Density: 16/km^{2} (42/sq mi)
- Time zone: UTC+01:00 (CET)
  - Summer (DST): UTC+02:00 (CEST)
- INSEE/Postal code: 27098 /27150
- ^{1} French Land Register data, which excludes lakes, ponds, glaciers > 1 km^{2} (0.386 sq mi or 247 acres) and river estuaries.

Bouchevilliers (French pronunciation: [buʃvilje]) is a commune in the Eure department in Normandy in north-western France.

== Population ==
Historical population
Year	Pop.	±% p.a.
1968	62	—
1975	60	−0.47%
1982	63	+0.70%
1990	45	−4.12%
1999	52	+1.62%
2007	78	+5.20%
2012	73	−1.32%
2017	81	+2.10%
2023	70	−2.40%
Source: INSEE

== See also ==
- Communes of the Eure department
