= Croisy-sur-Andelle =

- Commune
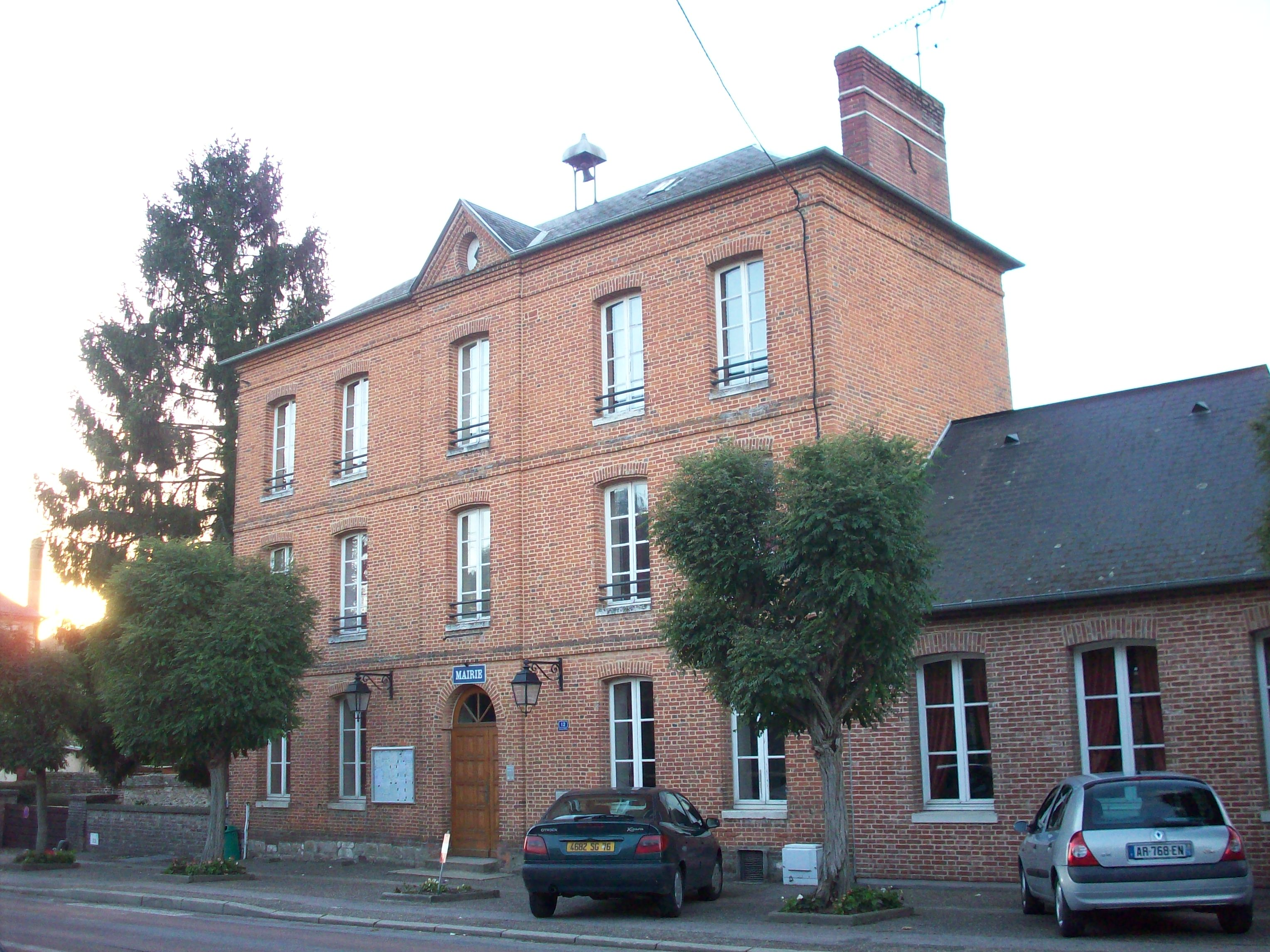
- The town hall in Croisy-sur-Andelle

- Coat of arms
- Location of Croisy-sur-Andelle
- Location within France Location within Normandy
- Coordinates: 49°27′41″N 1°23′51″E
- Country: France
- Region: Normandy
- Department: Seine-Maritime
- Arrondissement: Dieppe
- Canton: Gournay-en-Bray
- Intercommunality: CC 4 rivières

Government
  - Mayor (2026–32): Karine Buquet
- Area^{1}: 3.83 km^{2} (1.48 sq mi)
- Elevation: 72 m (236 ft)
- Highest elevation: 160 m (520 ft)
- Lowest elevation: 53 m (174 ft)
- Population (2023): 516
  - Density: 135/km^{2} (349/sq mi)
- Time zone: UTC+01:00 (CET)
  - Summer (DST): UTC+02:00 (CEST)
- INSEE/Postal code: 76201 /76780
- ^{1} French Land Register data, which excludes lakes, ponds, glaciers > 1 km^{2} (0.386 sq mi or 247 acres) and river estuaries.

Croisy-sur-Andelle (French pronunciation: [kʁwazi syʁ ɑ̃dɛl], literally Croisy on Andelle) is a commune in the Seine-Maritime department in the Normandy region in northern France.

== Geography ==
A farming village situated by the banks of the river Andelle in the Pays de Bray, some 16 miles (26 km) east of Rouen, at the junction of the D293 and the N31 roads.

== Heraldry ==
Arms of Croisy-sur-Andelle	The arms of Croisy-sur-Andelle are blazoned : Tierced per pall abased: 1: Gules, a leopard Or, 2&3: vert, a tree Or; overall a pall argent.

== Population ==
Historical population
Year	Pop.	±% p.a.
1968	308	—
1975	283	−1.20%
1982	358	+3.42%
1990	438	+2.55%
1999	525	+2.03%
2007	518	−0.17%
2012	537	+0.72%
2017	554	+0.63%
2023	516	−1.18%
Source: INSEE

== Places of interest ==
- The church of Notre-Dame, dating from the seventeenth century.
- Two manorhouses.

== See also ==
- Communes of the Seine-Maritime department
