= Houville-en-Vexin =

- Commune
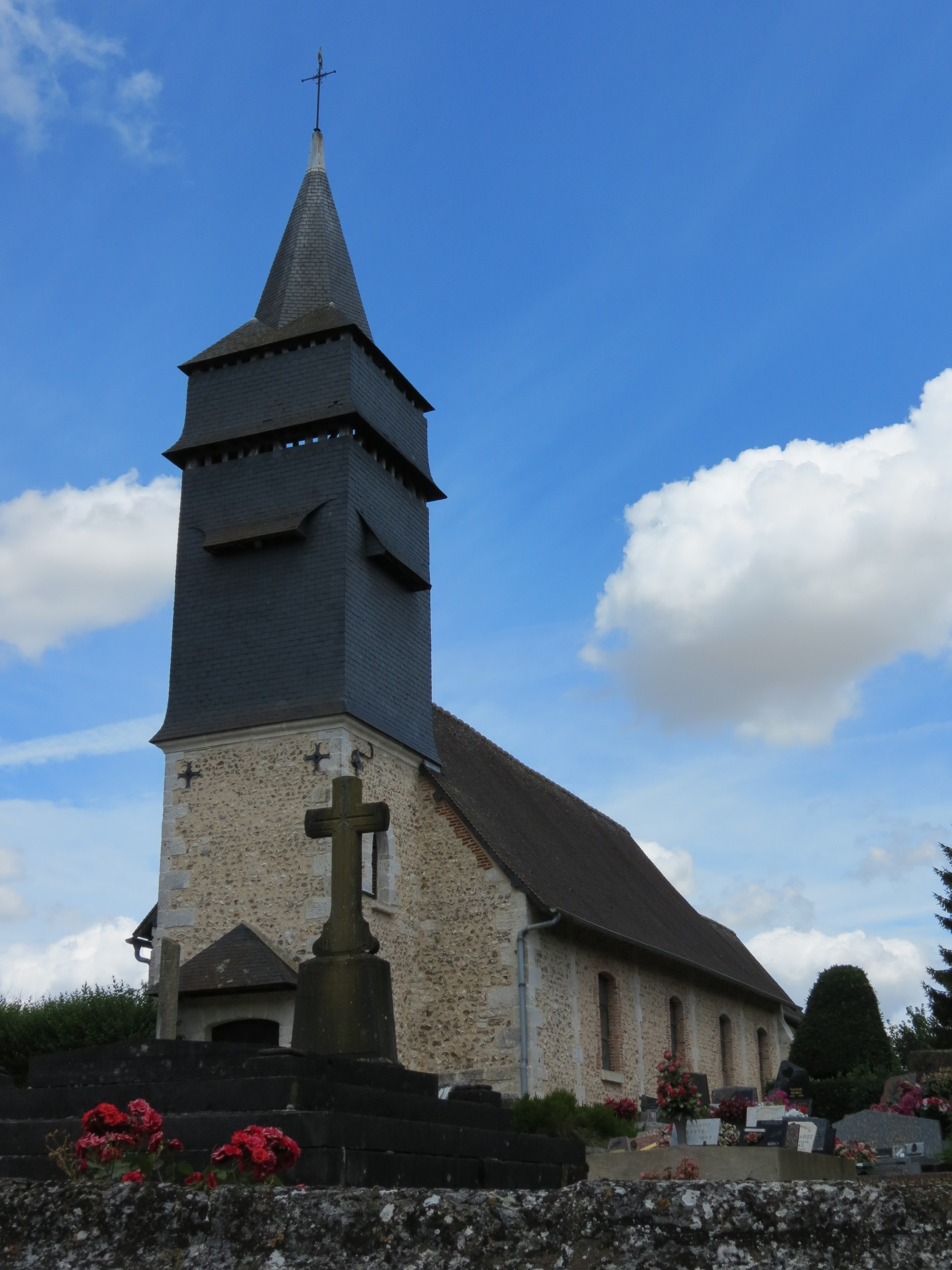
- The church in Houville-en-Vexin

- Coat of arms
- Location of Houville-en-Vexin
- Location within France Location within Normandy
- Coordinates: 49°17′49″N 1°21′22″E
- Country: France
- Region: Normandy
- Department: Eure
- Arrondissement: Les Andelys
- Canton: Romilly-sur-Andelle

Government
  - Mayor (2020–2026): Gilles Lebreton
- Area^{1}: 8.09 km^{2} (3.12 sq mi)
- Elevation: 158 m (518 ft)
- Highest elevation: 161 m (528 ft)
- Lowest elevation: 96 m (315 ft)
- Population (2023): 232
  - Density: 28.7/km^{2} (74.3/sq mi)
- Time zone: UTC+01:00 (CET)
  - Summer (DST): UTC+02:00 (CEST)
- INSEE/Postal code: 27346 /27440
- ^{1} French Land Register data, which excludes lakes, ponds, glaciers > 1 km^{2} (0.386 sq mi or 247 acres) and river estuaries.

Houville-en-Vexin (French pronunciation: [uvil ɑ̃ vɛksɛ̃], literally Houville in Vexin) is a commune in the Eure department in northern France.

== Population ==
Historical population
Year	Pop.	±% p.a.
1968	108	—
1975	94	−1.96%
1982	122	+3.79%
1990	167	+4.00%
1999	168	+0.07%
2007	209	+2.77%
2012	211	+0.19%
2017	233	+2.00%
2023	232	−0.07%
Source: INSEE

== See also ==
- Communes of the Eure department
