= Fleury-la-Forêt =

- Commune
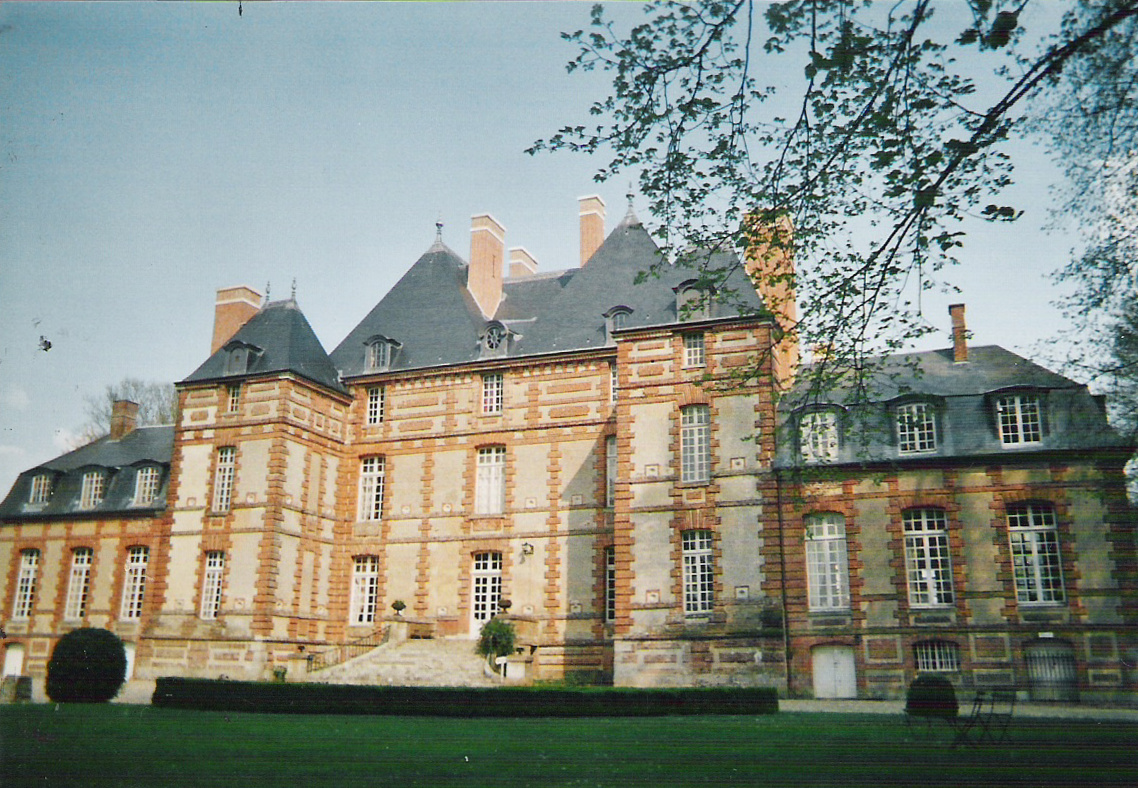
- Chateau
- Location of Fleury-la-Forêt
- Location within France Location within Normandy
- Coordinates: 49°25′13″N 1°33′21″E
- Country: France
- Region: Normandy
- Department: Eure
- Arrondissement: Les Andelys
- Canton: Romilly-sur-Andelle

Government
  - Mayor (2020–2026): Arnaud Godebout
- Area^{1}: 7.85 km^{2} (3.03 sq mi)
- Elevation: 167 m (548 ft)
- Highest elevation: 181 m (594 ft)
- Lowest elevation: 119 m (390 ft)
- Population (2023): 292
  - Density: 37.2/km^{2} (96.3/sq mi)
- Time zone: UTC+01:00 (CET)
  - Summer (DST): UTC+02:00 (CEST)
- INSEE/Postal code: 27245 /27480
- ^{1} French Land Register data, which excludes lakes, ponds, glaciers > 1 km^{2} (0.386 sq mi or 247 acres) and river estuaries.

Fleury-la-Forêt (French pronunciation: [flœʁi la fɔʁɛ]) is a commune in the Eure department in the Normandy region in northern France.

== Population ==
Historical population
Year	Pop.	±% p.a.
1968	261	—
1975	227	−1.97%
1982	215	−0.77%
1990	197	−1.09%
1999	253	+2.82%
2007	268	+0.72%
2012	284	+1.17%
2017	265	−1.38%
2023	292	+1.63%
Source: INSEE

== See also ==
- Communes of the Eure department
