= Lorleau =

- Commune
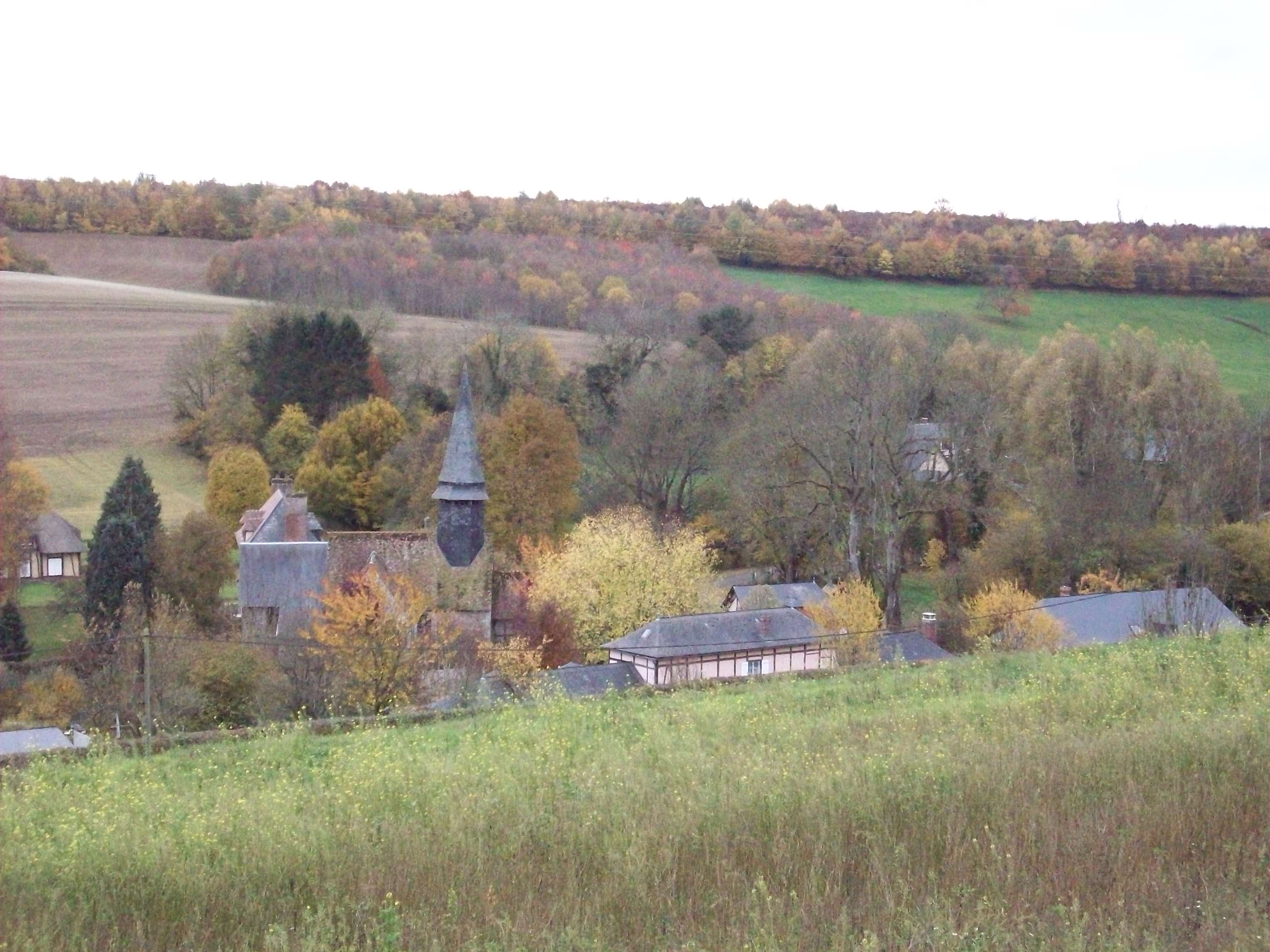
- A general view of Lorleau
- Location of Lorleau
- Location within France Location within Normandy
- Coordinates: 49°24′54″N 1°30′07″E
- Country: France
- Region: Normandy
- Department: Eure
- Arrondissement: Les Andelys
- Canton: Romilly-sur-Andelle

Government
  - Mayor (2020–2026): Chantal Grouchy
- Area^{1}: 12.31 km^{2} (4.75 sq mi)
- Elevation: 154 m (505 ft)
- Highest elevation: 171 m (561 ft)
- Lowest elevation: 86 m (282 ft)
- Population (2023): 99
  - Density: 8.0/km^{2} (21/sq mi)
- Time zone: UTC+01:00 (CET)
  - Summer (DST): UTC+02:00 (CEST)
- INSEE/Postal code: 27373 /27480
- ^{1} French Land Register data, which excludes lakes, ponds, glaciers > 1 km^{2} (0.386 sq mi or 247 acres) and river estuaries.

Lorleau (French pronunciation: [lɔʁlo]) is a commune in the Eure department in Normandy in northern France.

== Population ==
Historical population
Year	Pop.	±% p.a.
1968	119	—
1975	111	−0.99%
1982	110	−0.13%
1990	118	+0.88%
1999	137	+1.67%
2007	157	+1.72%
2012	134	−3.12%
2017	144	+1.45%
2023	99	−6.05%
Source: INSEE

== See also ==
- Communes of the Eure department
