= Sigy-en-Bray =

- Commune
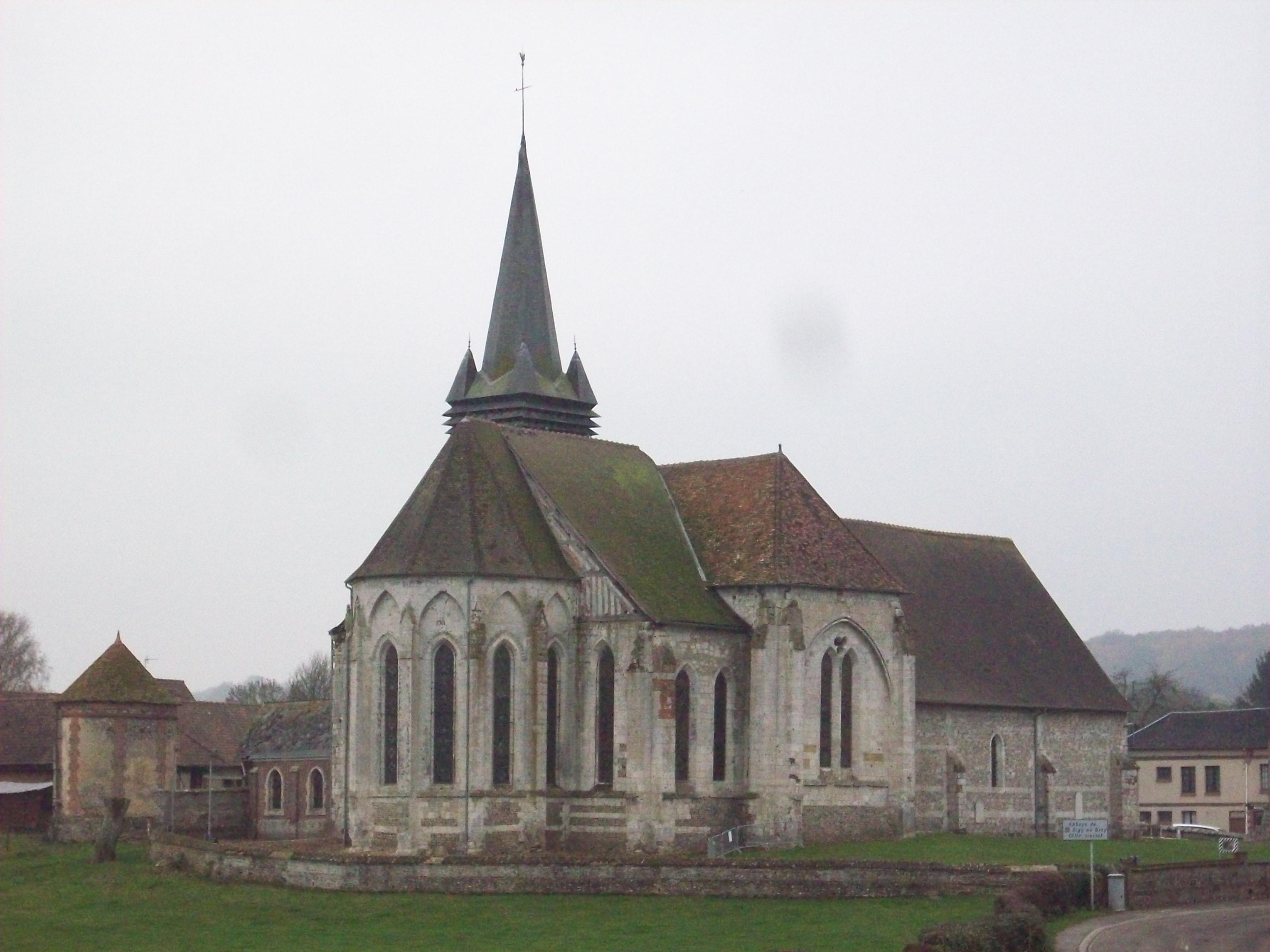
- The church in Sigy-en-Bray
- Location of Sigy-en-Bray
- Location within France Location within Normandy
- Coordinates: 49°32′50″N 1°29′29″E
- Country: France
- Region: Normandy
- Department: Seine-Maritime
- Arrondissement: Dieppe
- Canton: Gournay-en-Bray
- Intercommunality: CC 4 rivières

Government
  - Mayor (2026–32): Sabrina Goulay
- Area^{1}: 17.87 km^{2} (6.90 sq mi)
- Elevation: 107 m (351 ft)
- Highest elevation: 228 m (748 ft)
- Lowest elevation: 90 m (300 ft)
- Population (2023): 490
  - Density: 27/km^{2} (71/sq mi)
- Demonym(s): sigeois, sigeoises
- Time zone: UTC+01:00 (CET)
  - Summer (DST): UTC+02:00 (CEST)
- INSEE/Postal code: 76676 /76780
- ^{1} French Land Register data, which excludes lakes, ponds, glaciers > 1 km^{2} (0.386 sq mi or 247 acres) and river estuaries.

Sigy-en-Bray (French pronunciation: [siʒi ɑ̃ bʁɛ], literally Sigy in Bray, before 1962: Sigy) is a commune in the Seine-Maritime department in the Normandy region in northern France. Between 1973 and 2017 the commune Saint-Lucien was part of Sigy-en-Bray.

== Geography ==
A farming commune comprising several villages and hamlets covering a large area of land (27 km^{2}). It is found in the valley of the Andelle river in the Pays de Bray, some 19 miles (31 km) northeast of Rouen, at the junction of the D13, D41 and D8 roads.

== Population ==
Inhabitants of Sigy are called sigeois and sigeoises in French. Population data refer to the area corresponding with the commune as of January 2025.

Historical population
Year	Pop.	±% p.a.
1968	409	—
1975	409	+0.00%
1982	418	+0.31%
1990	395	−0.70%
1999	419	+0.66%
2007	426	+0.21%
2012	487	+2.71%
2017	515	+1.12%
2023	490	−0.83%
Source: INSEE

== Places of interest ==
- The church of St. Martin, originally an abbey, dating from the thirteenth century.
- The chateau of Imbleval.
- A fifteenth-century sandstone cross.
- The church of St. Lucien, dating from the eleventh century.
- The chapel of St. Vincent at Bois-le-Borgne.

== See also ==
- Communes of the Seine-Maritime department
