= Touffreville, Eure =

Touffreville
- Commune
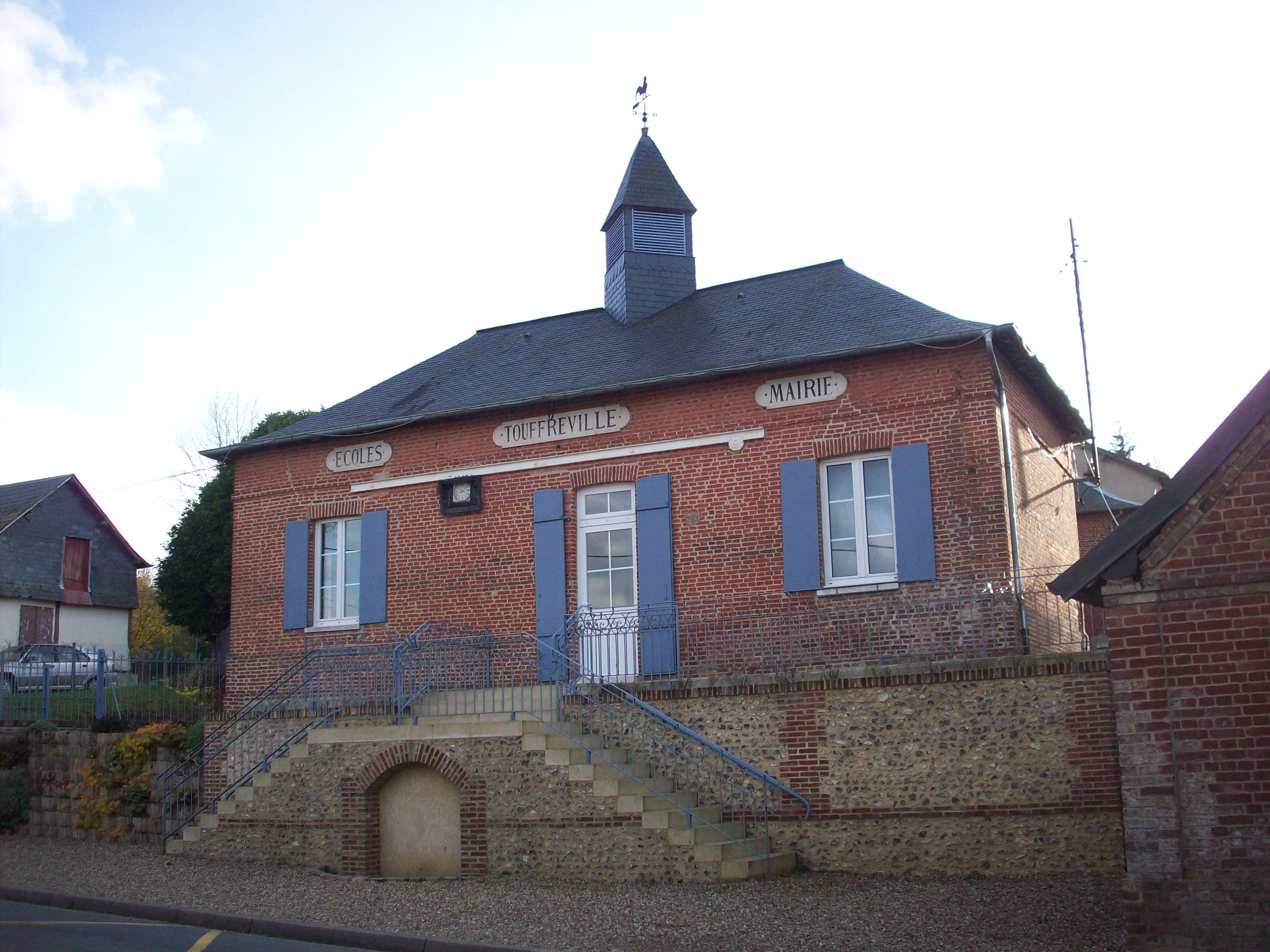
- The town hall.
- Location of Touffreville
- Location within France Location within Normandy
- Coordinates: 49°21′05″N 1°26′31″E
- Country: France
- Region: Normandy
- Department: Eure
- Arrondissement: Les Andelys
- Canton: Romilly-sur-Andelle
- Intercommunality: Lyons Andelle

Government
  - Mayor (2020–2026): Sophie Malhaire
- Area^{1}: 10.68 km^{2} (4.12 sq mi)
- Elevation: 53 m (174 ft)
- Highest elevation: 162 m (531 ft)
- Lowest elevation: 49 m (161 ft)
- Population (2023): 334
  - Density: 31.3/km^{2} (81.0/sq mi)
- Time zone: UTC+01:00 (CET)
  - Summer (DST): UTC+02:00 (CEST)
- INSEE/Postal code: 27649 /27440
- ^{1} French Land Register data, which excludes lakes, ponds, glaciers > 1 km^{2} (0.386 sq mi or 247 acres) and river estuaries.

Touffreville (French pronunciation: [tufʁəvil]) is a commune in the Eure department in Normandy in north-western France.

== Population ==
Historical population
Year	Pop.	±% p.a.
1968	295	—
1975	266	−1.47%
1982	277	+0.58%
1990	278	+0.05%
1999	277	−0.04%
2007	312	+1.50%
2012	341	+1.79%
2017	351	+0.58%
2023	334	−0.82%
Source: INSEE

== See also ==
- Communes of the Eure department
