= Martagny =

- Commune
- Location of Martagny
- Location within France Location within Normandy
- Coordinates: 49°23′45″N 1°39′37″E
- Country: France
- Region: Normandy
- Department: Eure
- Arrondissement: Les Andelys
- Canton: Romilly-sur-Andelle
- Intercommunality: CC Vexin Normand

Government
  - Mayor (2020–2026): Laurent Lainé
- Area^{1}: 4.38 km^{2} (1.69 sq mi)
- Elevation: 121 m (397 ft)
- Highest elevation: 177 m (581 ft)
- Lowest elevation: 95 m (312 ft)
- Population (2023): 136
  - Density: 31.1/km^{2} (80.4/sq mi)
- Time zone: UTC+01:00 (CET)
  - Summer (DST): UTC+02:00 (CEST)
- INSEE/Postal code: 27392 /27150
- ^{1} French Land Register data, which excludes lakes, ponds, glaciers > 1 km^{2} (0.386 sq mi or 247 acres) and river estuaries.

Martagny (French pronunciation: [maʁtaɲi]) is a commune in the Eure department in Normandy in northern France.

== Population ==
Historical population
Year	Pop.	±% p.a.
1968	102	—
1975	94	−1.16%
1982	89	−0.78%
1990	94	+0.69%
1999	120	+2.75%
2007	137	+1.67%
2012	139	+0.29%
2017	152	+1.80%
2023	136	−1.84%
Source: INSEE

== See also ==
- Communes of the Eure department
