= Saint-Lucien, Seine-Maritime =

Saint-Lucien
- Commune
- Location of Saint-Lucien
- Location within France Location within Normandy
- Coordinates: 49°30′29″N 1°26′56″E
- Country: France
- Region: Normandy
- Department: Seine-Maritime
- Arrondissement: Dieppe
- Canton: Gournay-en-Bray
- Intercommunality: CC 4 rivières

Government
  - Mayor (2020–2026): Jean-Pierre Letellier
- Area^{1}: 9.3 km^{2} (3.6 sq mi)
- Population (2023): 234
  - Density: 25/km^{2} (65/sq mi)
- Time zone: UTC+01:00 (CET)
  - Summer (DST): UTC+02:00 (CEST)
- INSEE/Postal code: 76601 /76780
- ^{1} French Land Register data, which excludes lakes, ponds, glaciers > 1 km^{2} (0.386 sq mi or 247 acres) and river estuaries.

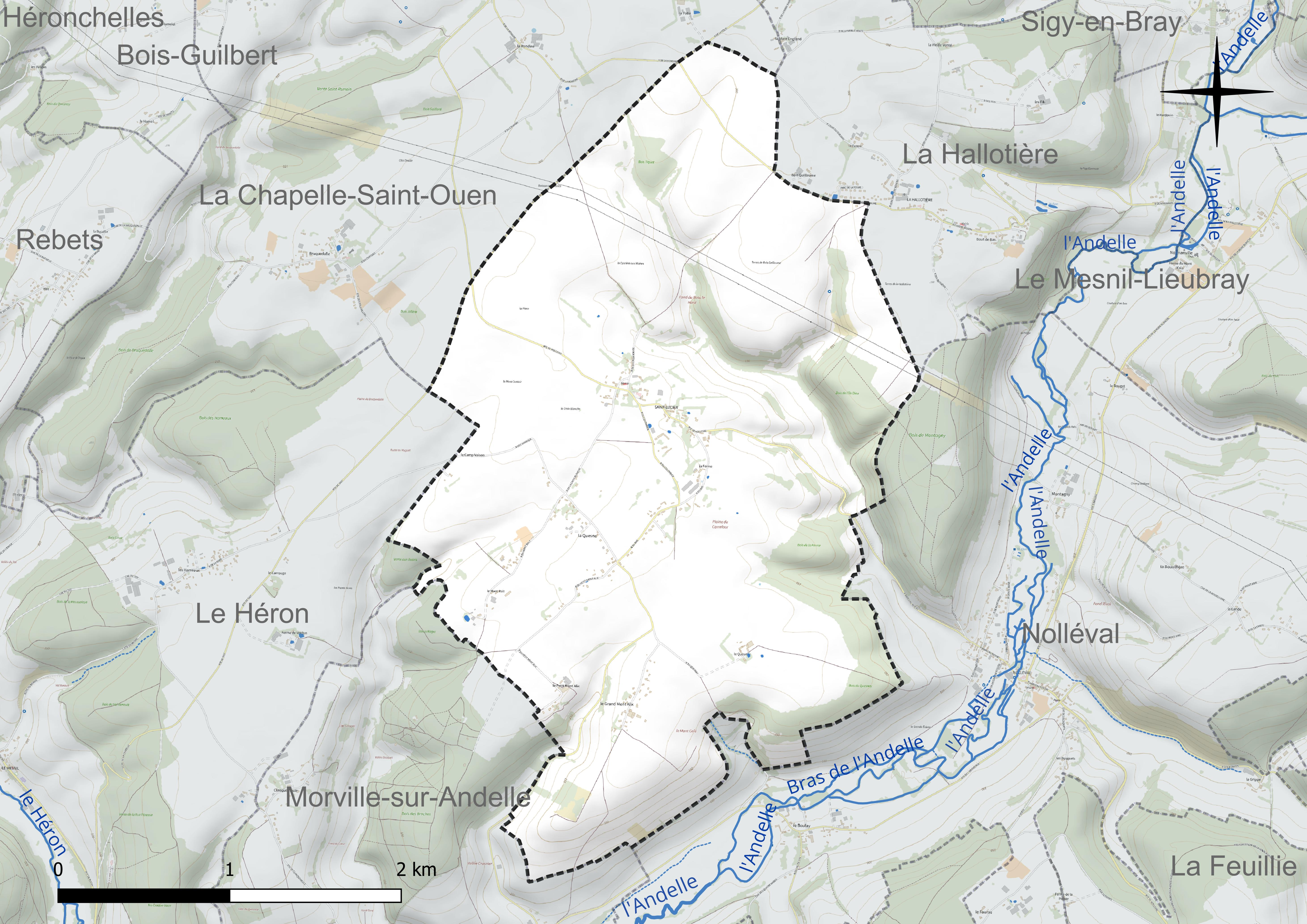
Map of the hydrographic network of the commune of Saint-Lucien

Saint-Lucien (French pronunciation: [sɛ̃ lysjɛ̃]) is a commune in the Seine-Maritime department in the Normandy region in northern France. Between 1973 and 2017 it was part of the commune Sigy-en-Bray.

== Population ==
Historical population
Year	Pop.	±% p.a.
1968	169	—
1975	140	−2.65%
1982	115	−2.77%
1990	132	+1.74%
1999	140	+0.66%
2007	202	+4.69%
2012	235	+3.07%
2017	245	+0.84%
2023	234	−0.76%
Source: INSEE

== See also ==
- Communes of the Seine-Maritime department
