= Letteguives =

- Commune
- Location of Letteguives
- Location within France Location within Normandy
- Coordinates: 49°25′30″N 1°19′47″E
- Country: France
- Region: Normandy
- Department: Eure
- Arrondissement: Les Andelys
- Canton: Romilly-sur-Andelle
- Intercommunality: Lyons Andelle

Government
  - Mayor (2020–2026): Valérie Gregoire
- Area^{1}: 4.1 km^{2} (1.6 sq mi)
- Elevation: 126 m (413 ft)
- Highest elevation: 149 m (489 ft)
- Lowest elevation: 72 m (236 ft)
- Population (2023): 209
  - Density: 51/km^{2} (130/sq mi)
- Time zone: UTC+01:00 (CET)
  - Summer (DST): UTC+02:00 (CEST)
- INSEE/Postal code: 27366 /27910
- ^{1} French Land Register data, which excludes lakes, ponds, glaciers > 1 km^{2} (0.386 sq mi or 247 acres) and river estuaries.

Letteguives (French pronunciation: [lɛtɡiv]) is a commune in the Eure department in Normandy in north-western France.

== Population ==
Historical population
Year	Pop.	±% p.a.
1968	133	—
1975	110	−2.68%
1982	164	+5.87%
1990	187	+1.65%
1999	184	−0.18%
2007	197	+0.86%
2012	207	+1.00%
2017	203	−0.39%
2023	209	+0.49%
Source: INSEE

== See also ==
- Communes of the Eure department
