= Vascœuil =

- Commune
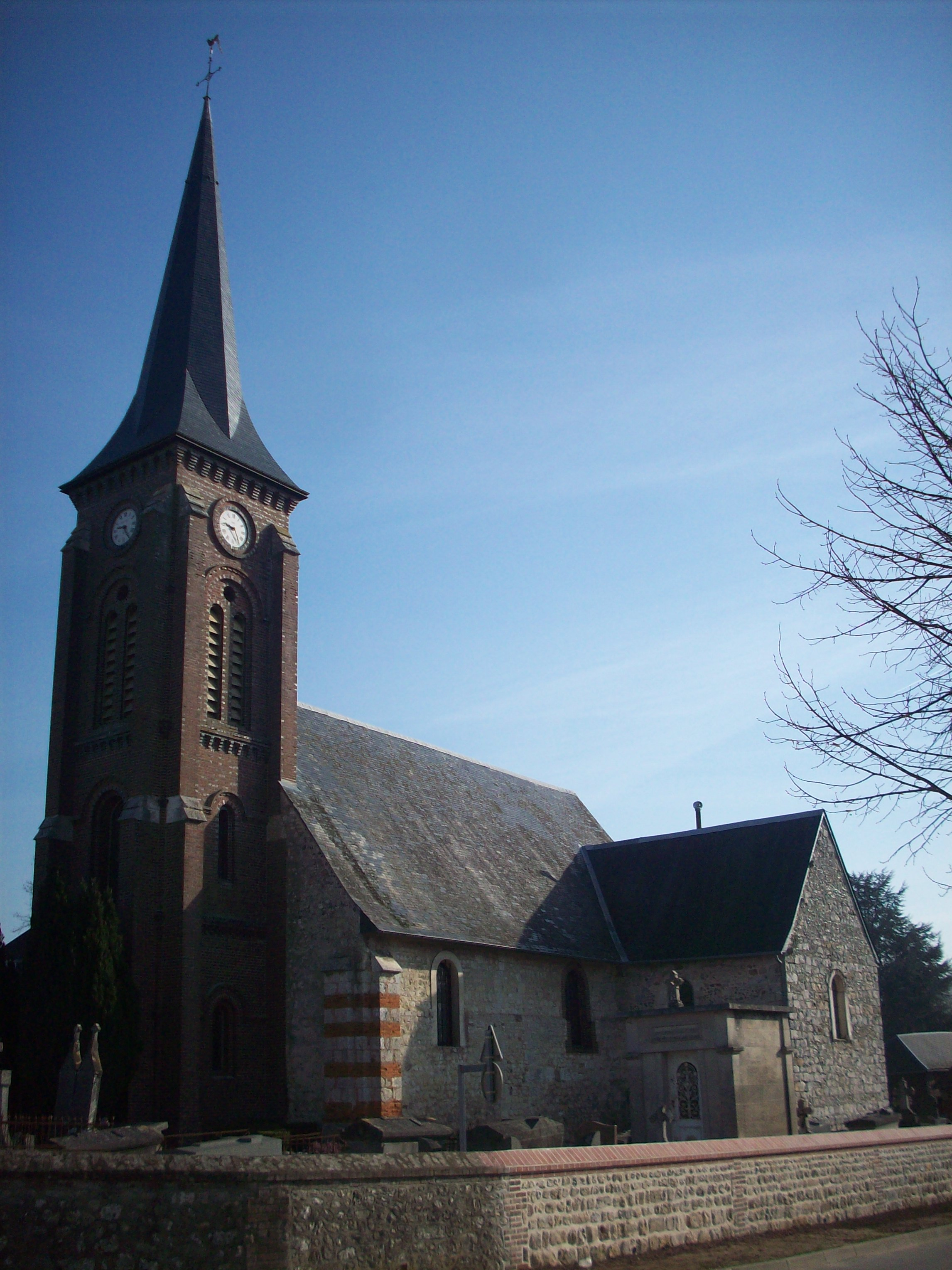
- St-Martial in Vascœuil
- Location of Vascœuil
- Location within France Location within Normandy
- Coordinates: 49°26′44″N 1°22′41″E
- Country: France
- Region: Normandy
- Department: Eure
- Arrondissement: Les Andelys
- Canton: Romilly-sur-Andelle

Government
  - Mayor (2020–2026): Jean-Luc Moëns
- Area^{1}: 7.39 km^{2} (2.85 sq mi)
- Elevation: 57 m (187 ft)
- Highest elevation: 171 m (561 ft)
- Lowest elevation: 52 m (171 ft)
- Population (2023): 306
  - Density: 41.4/km^{2} (107/sq mi)
- Time zone: UTC+01:00 (CET)
  - Summer (DST): UTC+02:00 (CEST)
- INSEE/Postal code: 27672 /27910
- ^{1} French Land Register data, which excludes lakes, ponds, glaciers > 1 km^{2} (0.386 sq mi or 247 acres) and river estuaries.

Vascœuil (French pronunciation: [vakœj]) is a commune in the Eure department in Normandy in northern France.

== Population ==
Historical population
Year	Pop.	±% p.a.
1968	278	—
1975	271	−0.36%
1982	317	+2.27%
1990	344	+1.03%
1999	339	−0.16%
2007	339	+0.00%
2012	345	+0.35%
2017	355	+0.57%
2023	306	−2.45%
Source: INSEE

== See also ==
- Communes of the Eure department
