= Perruel =

- Commune
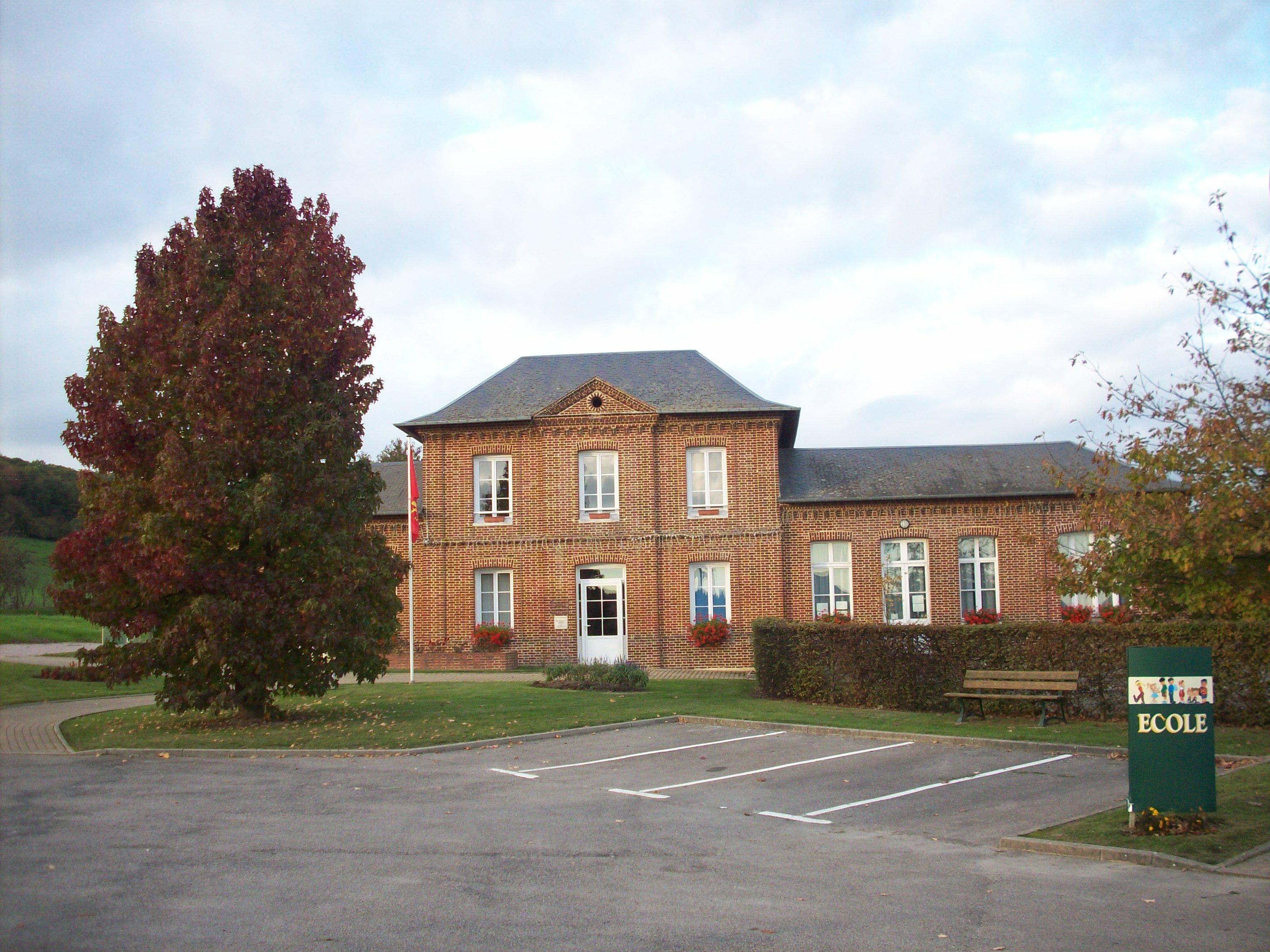
- The town hall in Perruel

- Coat of arms
- Location of Perruel
- Location within France Location within Normandy
- Coordinates: 49°25′45″N 1°22′33″E
- Country: France
- Region: Normandy
- Department: Eure
- Arrondissement: Les Andelys
- Canton: Romilly-sur-Andelle

Government
  - Mayor (2020–2026): Vincent Quéné
- Area^{1}: 5.37 km^{2} (2.07 sq mi)
- Elevation: 54 m (177 ft)
- Highest elevation: 143 m (469 ft)
- Lowest elevation: 46 m (151 ft)
- Population (2023): 465
  - Density: 86.6/km^{2} (224/sq mi)
- Time zone: UTC+01:00 (CET)
  - Summer (DST): UTC+02:00 (CEST)
- INSEE/Postal code: 27454 /27910
- ^{1} French Land Register data, which excludes lakes, ponds, glaciers > 1 km^{2} (0.386 sq mi or 247 acres) and river estuaries.

Perruel (French pronunciation: [pɛʁɥɛl]) is a commune in the Eure department in Normandy in northern France.

The village shelters the ancient abbey of Isle-Dieu, today a farm on the road between Perruel and Vascoeuil.

== Population ==
Historical population
Year	Pop.	±% p.a.
1968	310	—
1975	333	+1.03%
1982	372	+1.59%
1990	355	−0.58%
1999	401	+1.36%
2007	447	+1.37%
2012	470	+1.01%
2017	469	−0.04%
2023	465	−0.14%
Source: INSEE

== See also ==
- Communes of the Eure department
