= Les Hogues =

- Commune
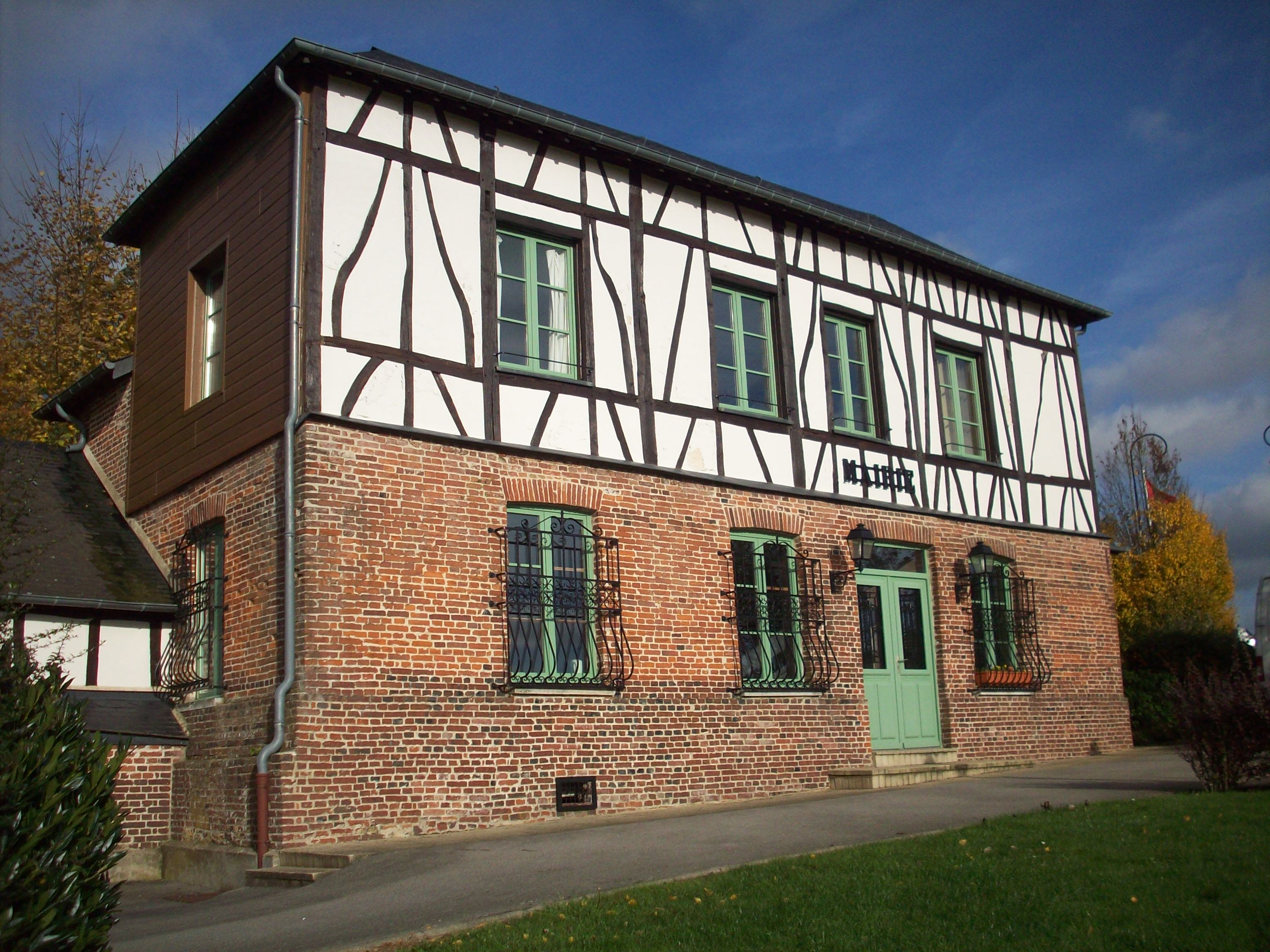
- The town hall in Les Hogues
- Location of Les Hogues
- Location within France Location within Normandy
- Coordinates: 49°25′38″N 1°23′50″E
- Country: France
- Region: Normandy
- Department: Eure
- Arrondissement: Les Andelys
- Canton: Romilly-sur-Andelle

Government
  - Mayor (2020–2026): Aline Bachelet
- Area^{1}: 11.81 km^{2} (4.56 sq mi)
- Highest elevation: 179 m (587 ft)
- Lowest elevation: 50 m (160 ft)
- Population (2023): 674
  - Density: 57.1/km^{2} (148/sq mi)
- Time zone: UTC+01:00 (CET)
  - Summer (DST): UTC+02:00 (CEST)
- INSEE/Postal code: 27338 /27910
- ^{1} French Land Register data, which excludes lakes, ponds, glaciers > 1 km^{2} (0.386 sq mi or 247 acres) and river estuaries.

Les Hogues is a commune in the Eure department in northern France.

== Population ==
Historical population
Year	Pop.	±% p.a.
1968	545	—
1975	543	−0.05%
1982	503	−1.09%
1990	516	+0.32%
1999	568	+1.07%
2007	621	+1.12%
2012	646	+0.79%
2017	642	−0.12%
2023	674	+0.81%
Source: INSEE

== See also ==
- Communes of the Eure department
