= Canton of Romilly-sur-Andelle =

Canton in Normandy, France

Coordinates: 49.33°N 1.26°E

The canton of Romilly-sur-Andelle is an administrative division of the Eure department, northern France. It was created at the French canton reorganisation which came into effect in March 2015. Its seat is in Romilly-sur-Andelle.

It consists of the following communes:

1. Amfreville-les-Champs
2. Bacqueville
3. Beauficel-en-Lyons
4. Bézu-la-Forêt
5. Bosquentin
6. Bouchevilliers
7. Bourg-Beaudouin
8. Charleval
9. Douville-sur-Andelle
10. Fleury-la-Forêt
11. Fleury-sur-Andelle
12. Flipou
13. Les Hogues
14. Houville-en-Vexin
15. Letteguives
16. Lilly
17. Lisors
18. Lorleau
19. Lyons-la-Forêt
20. Mainneville
21. Martagny
22. Ménesqueville
23. Mesnil-sous-Vienne
24. Perriers-sur-Andelle
25. Perruel
26. Pont-Saint-Pierre
27. Radepont
28. Renneville
29. Romilly-sur-Andelle
30. Rosay-sur-Lieure
31. Touffreville
32. Le Tronquay
33. Val d'Orger
34. Vandrimare
35. Vascœuil
