= Martin-Roch-Xavier Estève =

Napoleon's treasurer (1772–1853)

Count of the Empire Martin-Roch-Xavier Estève Officer of the Legion of Honour
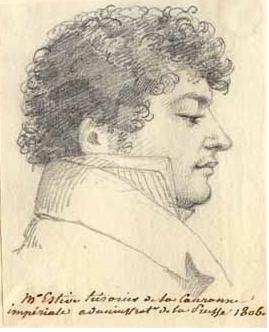
- Portrait by Frédéric-Christophe d'Houdetot of Estève as Administrator of Prussia, pencil, charcoal highlight, Berlin, 1806. Kept at the Council of State

Treasurer general of the Imperial Crown (Note: Treasurer general of the government (1801-1804))
- In office 1801 – December 1811
- Emperor (Note: First Consul (1801-1804)): Napoleon
- Succeeded by: Baron de La Bouillerie

Personal details
- Born: 21 July 1772 Montpellier, France
- Died: 1 March 1853 (aged 80) Heudicourt, France
- Spouse: Anne-Antoinette-Françoise Villeminot (m. 1802)
- Children: 4
- Occupation: Politician, treasurer

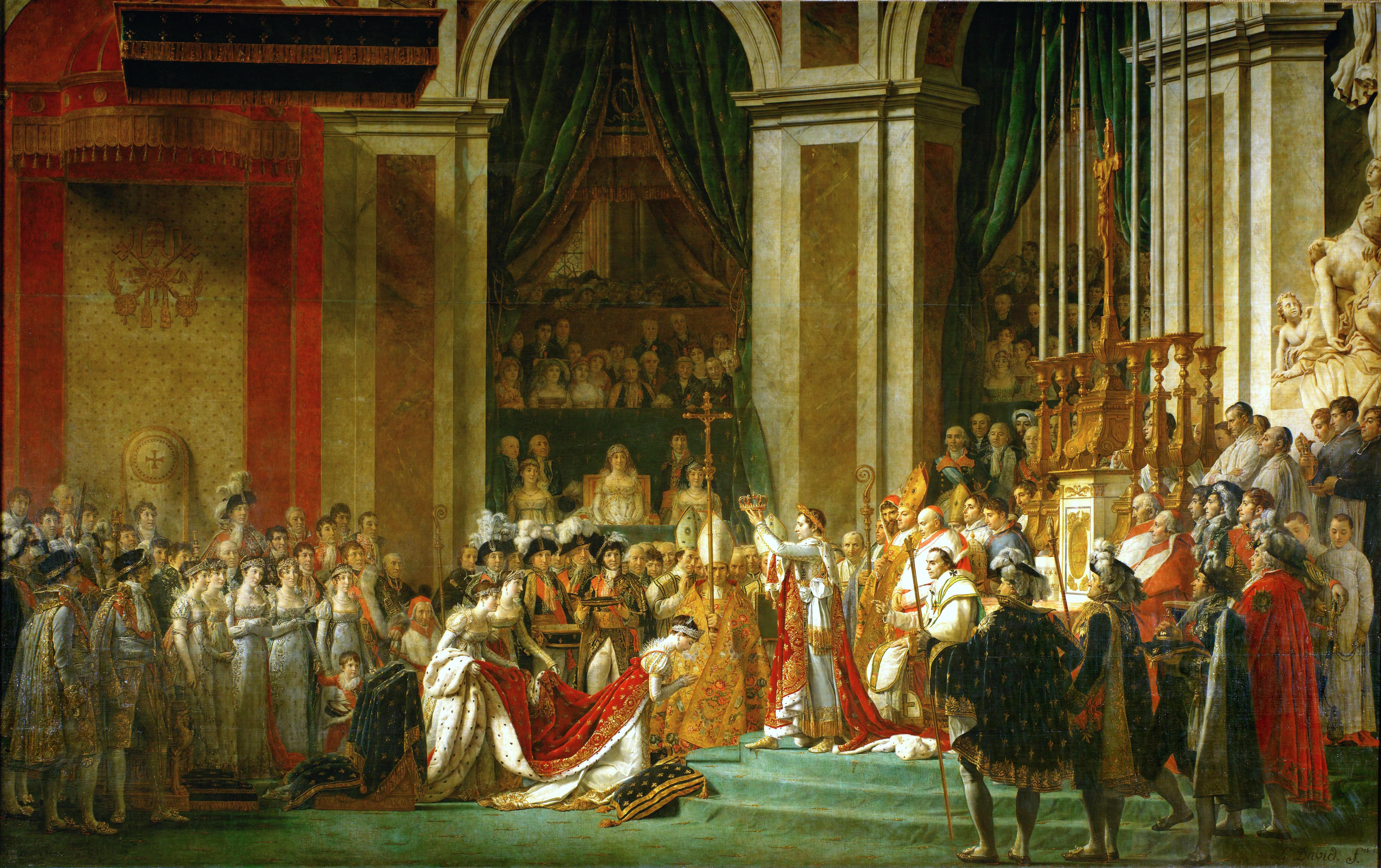
Estève at the Coronation of Napoleon, (pictured centre in the background), painted in the Coronation of Napoleon, 1807

Martin-Roch-Xavier Estève (21 July 1772 - 1 March 1853) was Napoleon’s Treasurer General under the First Empire.

== Biography ==
=== Early life ===
Estève was born on 21 July 1772 in Montpellier. He was the son of François Estève and Elisabeth-Louise Beraud.

=== Career under Napoleon ===
Engaged in 1792, Estève began in the services of the "army payroll."

Napoleon had known Estève in Italy in 1796 and appreciated his qualities. Estève followed the First Consul in the campaigns in Italy and Egypt, and was distinguished in his fidelity and his ability in carrying out jobs that were entrusted to him. He was appointed Deputy Paymaster General to the Treasury of the Army of Italy. Later, he was appointed Paymaster General of the Army of the East. He spent three years as "director general-accountant of public revenues of Egypt." In a country where resources were meager, Estève's administrative qualities excelled. He managed the finances of the new colony and reformed the tax system. His mission was essential, as it was necessary for the French to live of their conquest due to their naval disaster at the Battle of the Nile which led to them being cut off from France.

After he returned to France, he was attached to the household of Napoleon, where he brought in a clerk and his future successor, Guillaume Peyrusse, whose rise he promoted. He resided in this capacity in the Imperial Palace of Tuileries. He managed the affairs of the house of Napoleon and Napoleon then made him treasurer of his house. He was appointed treasurer of the government in 1801 and Treasurer General of the Crown in 1804. The Treasurer General, an officer of the house, was the principal administrator of the funds in paid by the State under the civil list. He was charged after the Battle of Jena in 1806 with managing the Prussian finances as "Administrator general of the finances and domains of the conquered countries beyond the Elbe." He was made Count of the Empire on 24 February 1809.

Nicolas François, Count Mollien, wrote in his memoirs that "Estève had perfectly justified this confidence by his probity." However, symptoms of serious alterations in his health after several years as treasurer, had begun to worry Napoleon. Napoleon thought he could not keep a diminished man in service. After a dispute with the Emperor, Estève resigned and in December 1811, he handed over his position as Treasurer General of the Crown to Baron de La Bouillerie, who contrary to what his successor did, handed over part of the treasure to the Count of Artois.

=== Family and descendants ===
He married Anne-Antoinette-Françoise Villeminot (17 April 1784 - 11 February 1865) on 5 October 1802 in the Saint-Thomas d'Aquin church in Paris, daughter of the banker César-Louis-Marie Villeminot (1749-1807). From this union, four children were born:

- Napoleon-César-Xavier Count Estève (3 November 1802 - 26 March 1864), General Councilor of Eure, married to Virginie Morin-Blotais. They had 6 children:
  - Paul-Louis-Xavier Count Estève, married to Angèle-Antoinette Bayet on 3 October 1860. They had no children.
  - Henri Count Estève (7 July 1844 - 27 September 1911), married to Blanche Babled. They had two children:
    - Jean-Joseph Estève, had children including:
      - Xavier-Jean-Marie Estève, married to Marie Louise De Volder. They had children including:
        - Yves Estève (10 May 1943 - 4 January 2026), married to Béatrix d'Andigne (8 March 1946 - 22 March 2020) in 1969. Yves Estève served as Mayor of Heudicourt. Estève had five children:
          - Eric
          - Florence
          - Laetitia
          - Veronique
          - Phillipe
    - Anne-Marie Estève, married to Charles de Hedouville on 12 December 1893
  - Valerie-Louise-Edwige Estève (1840 - 1 March 1855)
  - Marie-Eugenie-Pauline Estève, married to Gaston Gabriel Duval de Leseaude on 12 March 1874.
  - Mathilde-Virginie-Pauline, married to Claude-Louis-Marie-Alfred de Monti de Reze in November 1869
  - Urbaine-Pauline-Agathe, married to Bernard-Paul-Jean de Monti de Reze in November 1871
- Louis-Edouard-Roch Estève (21 June 1803 - 7 April 1894), auditor at the Council of State, 2nd class ordinary service (12 December 1832) to the War and Navy Committee.
- Eugène-Martin-François Estève (born 26 March 1807, Tuileries Palace, Paris, died in China on 1 July 1848), missionary priest of the Society of Jesus in the diocese of Nankin.
- Guillaum Jean-Paul Estève

=== Later life and death ===
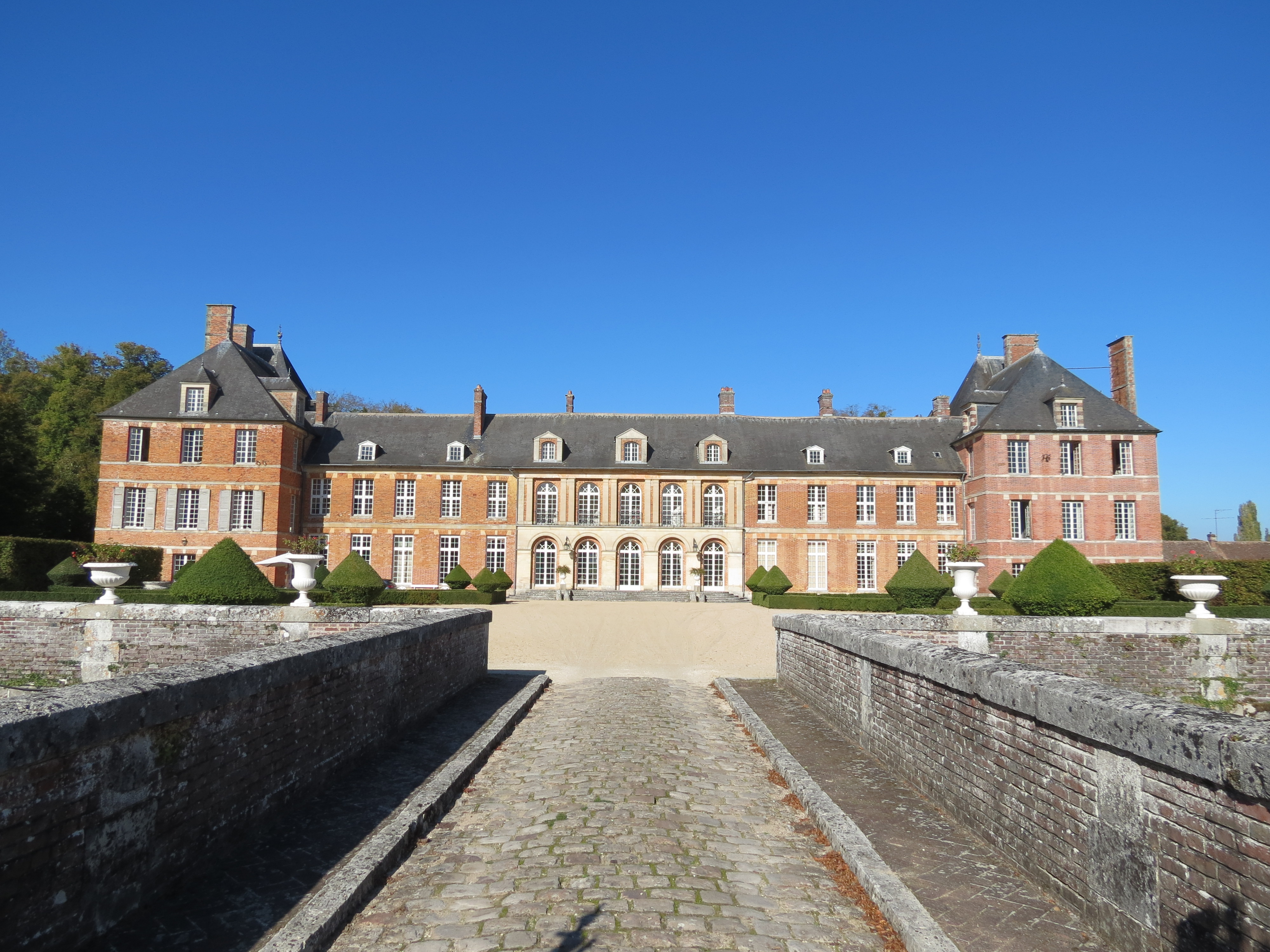
Château d'Heudicourt in 2018

In 1804, he bought the Château d'Heudicourt from four Parisian nobles and then undertook several renovations. He restored the castle under the moat and entrance bridge, and the side wings that were ruined. He added a classical stone building Façade in the centre of the Chateau. After his resignation as treasurer, Estève retired in Heudicourt to his Chateau. Estève died there on 1 March 1853, aged 80. The Chateau is still owned by the Estève family.

== Offices ==
- Paymaster general of the Army of the Orient
- Treasurer General of the Crown
- Administrator-general of finances and domains of the countries conquered beyond the Elbe in 1806.

== Publications ==
- " Memory on the finances of Egypt, from its conquest by Sultan Sélym I , to that of the general-in-chief Bonaparte", Description de l'Egypte, State modern, Paris, Imperial Printing, 1809, ^{p 299} -398. Count Estève had 60 copies of this work printed.

== Titles ==
- Count of the Empire 24 February 1809.

== Honours ==
- Officer of the Legion of Honour
- Treasurer of the first Cohort of the Legion of Honour.

== Tributes, honours and mentions ==
He was warmly attached to me; he would have taken my treasure by force to Fontainebleau. If he couldn't, he would have buried it, thrown it into the rivers, distributed it, rather than handing it over.

— Napoleon, The Memorial of Saint Helena, 2 June 1816

== Bibliography ==
- The imperial Almanac for the year 1810
- The Correspondent
