= Heudicourt =

Heudicourt is the name or part of the name of the following communes in France:

- Heudicourt, Eure, in the Eure department
- Heudicourt, Somme, in the Somme department
- Heudicourt-sous-les-Côtes, in the Meuse department
