= Hôtel de Boysson-Cheverry =

Coordinates: 43.6007°N 1.4432°E

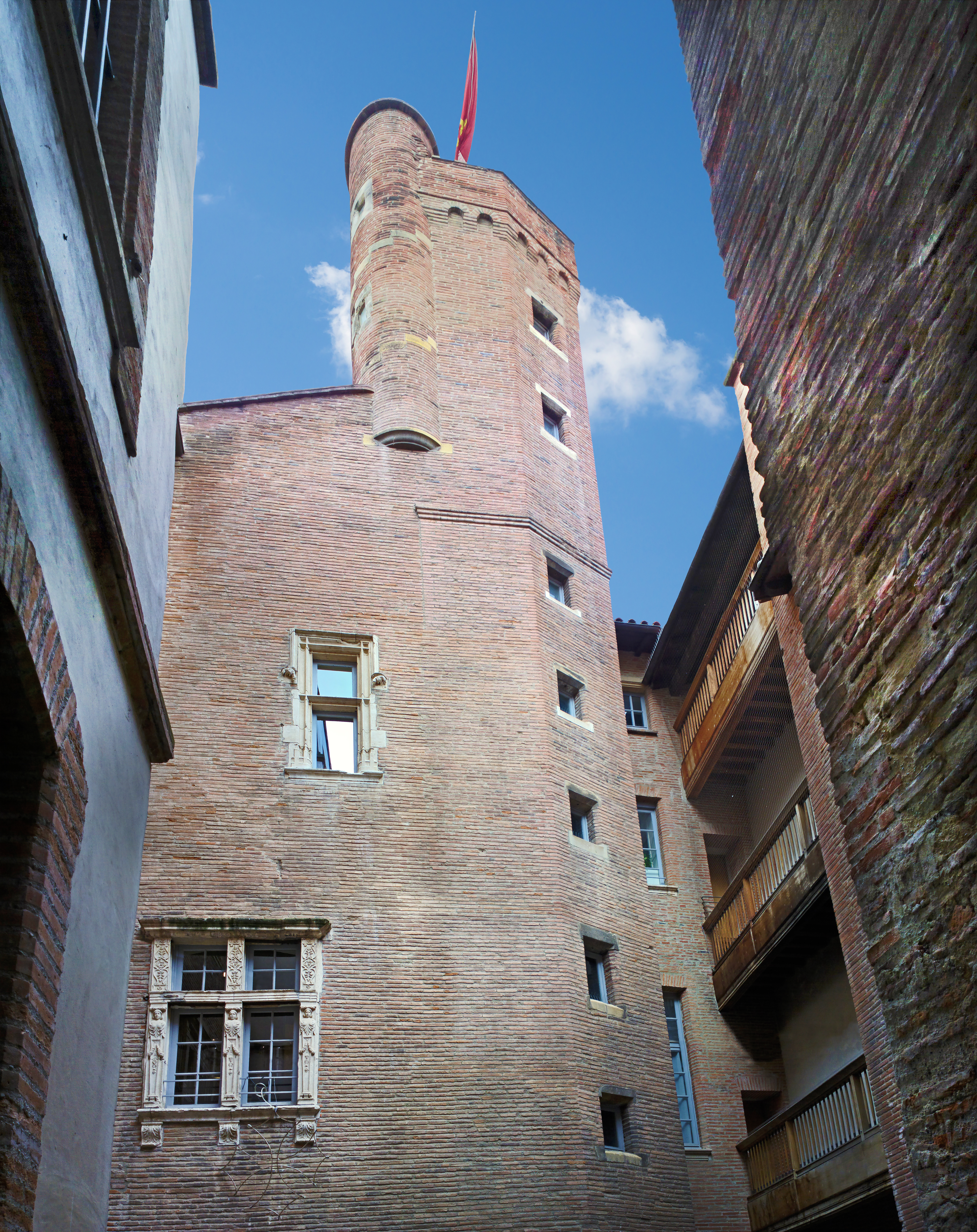

Hotel de Boysson-Cheverry is a mansion located at N° 11 rue Malcousinat, in the historic center of Toulouse. Built in the second half of the 15th century for a merchant, Hugues de Boysson, it was remodeled and considerably enlarged during the following century by another merchant Jean de Cheverry.

The building retains elements of numerous architectural styles accumulated over its centuries of existence.

It has been a listed historical monument since 1928.

The building now houses the Maison de l’Occitanie. This is an establishment that brings together associations dedicated to promoting the Occitan language and culture.

== History ==
=== de Boysson ===
In 1458, a ruined house on this site already belonged to Hugues de Boysson. He had made his money as a draper, dye merchant, and a money changer. He was originally from Aubin and settled in Toulouse in 1432. In 1437, he was ennobled by King Charles VII, along with his three brothers, Pierre, and two called Jean, merchants in Aubin and Figeac

The great fire of 7 May 1463 destroyed this house, like the other houses in the neighborhood. A new residence was constructed at some point between 1463 and 1468. It was in 1468 that Hugues became a municipal magistrate.

The building's façade faced the rue des Changes, while the courtyard and garden opened onto the rue Malcousinat.

In 1483, the house passed to his son, also called Hugues, and in turn in 1519, the townhouse passed to his eldest son, Jean de Boysson. He married Charlotte Massip, heiress of the seigneury of Bournazel, in Rouergue, where he decided to settle. In 1535, he sold the mansion in Toulouse.

=== de Cheverry ===
In 1535, the building was acquired by Jean de Cheverry, another dye merchant. He was elected a municipal magistrate one month after the purchase of the hotel de Boysson. During his period of ownership Jean de Cheverry undertook further developments of the property in a Renaissance style that corresponds to the fashion of the time. He had the windows of the tower modified and ordered the construction of four other buildings.

Following Jean's death in 1556, the buildings constructed by him were sold and only the main mansion building was retained by the family. However, in 1570 his son who was at that time treasurer general, sold it to another magistrate called Pierre de Vignaux, in order that he could acquire Hôtel de Pins on rue des Chapeliers (now 46 rue du Languedoc).

=== de Vignaux ===
Pierre de Vignaux, a municipal magistrate in 1570-1571, 1576-1577, 1585-1586, and 1591-1592, did not undertake any major renovations, but he left his coat of arms, replacing that of Hugues de Boysson, on the fireplace in the lower hall. The house was subsequently passed on to Antoine Ganté de Vignaux, who retained it until his death in 1622, and then to François Ganté de Vignaux, who died between 1665 and 1678.

=== de Mouilhet ===
In 1665, his son-in-law, Pierre de Mouilhet, a councillor in parliament from 1653 to 1685, married to Françoise de Ganté, acquired the house. In 1685, their son, Antoine de Mouilhet, inherited it, before passing it on in 1724 to François-Pierre de Mouilhet. In 1754, his son-in-law, Jean-François de Montégut, sold it to Jean-François-Ambroise Rermon, lord of Armentière.

=== Late 18th Century to present ===
In 1775, the hotel passed to Bertrand Autenac, who had a new facade built, aligning it with Rue Malcousinat. In 1793, it was acquired by a man by the name of Lagarde.

The building was bequeathed to charity by Madame. Salle in 1918.

== Description ==
The building retains elements representative of the Gothic style, especially for the parts built by the original Huc de Boysson, but also Renaissance elements, in the parts developed by Jean de Cheverry.

=== Entrance ===
The entrance is located on rue Malcousinat through a building constructed by Bertrand Autenac in 1776. It provides access to the first courtyard, with a view of the tower.

=== First Courtyard ===
The first courtyard corresponds to the inner courtyard of the first residence of Hugues I Boysson: it was then accessed via the Rue des Changes (present-day number 21). At the far end of the courtyard stands Boysson's Gothic building, built against the chapter house tower. On either side, the Renaissance-style wings were added by Jean Cheverry in 1535. To the left, the first-floor window of Cheverry's residence still retains its original Renaissance woodwork at the bottom.

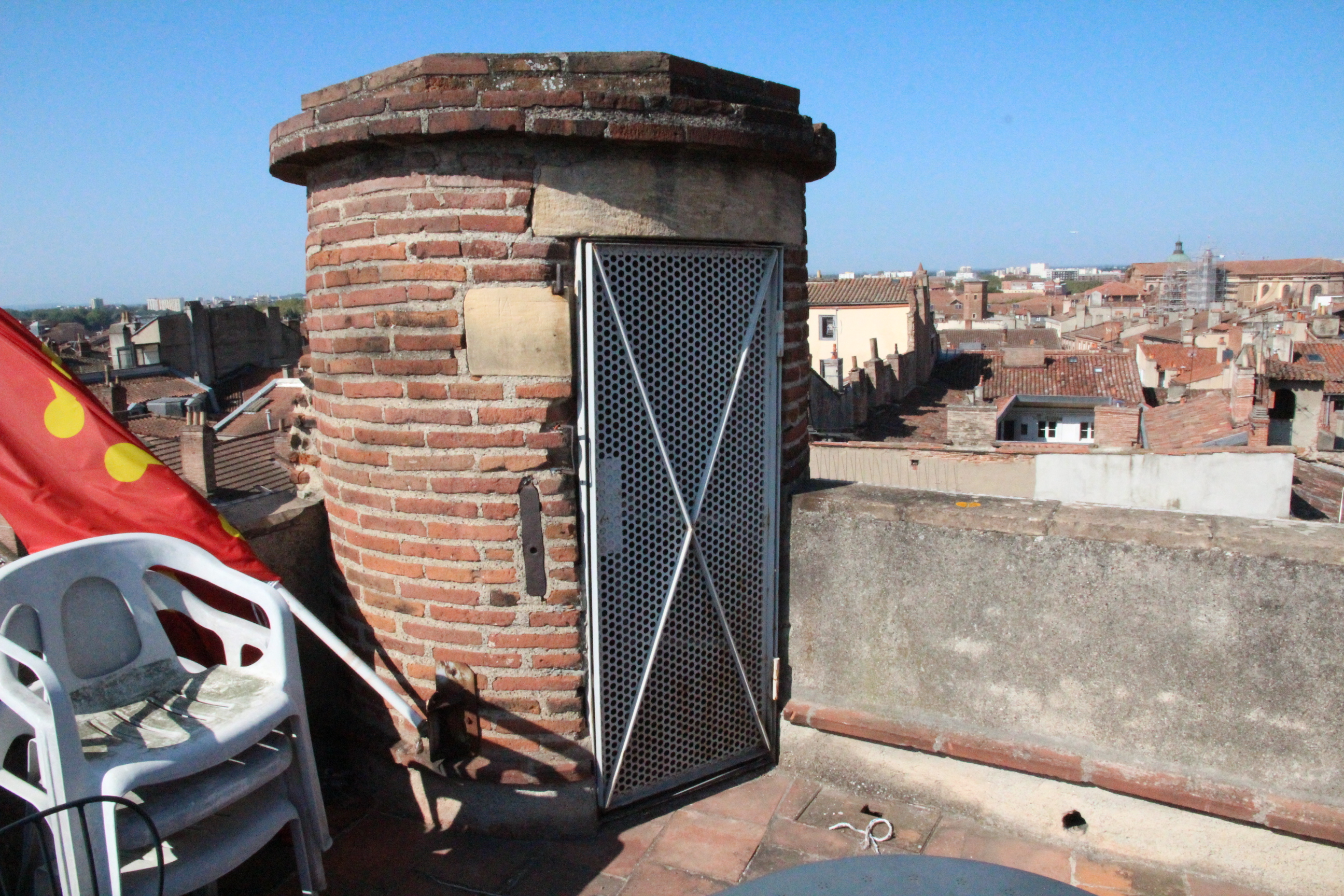
Terrace and turret at the top of the tower.

The tall hexagonal tower, 24 meters high (26 meters including the turret), is crowned by a terrace and blind machicolations, and flanked by a round turret. It is pierced by seven small windows that illuminate the spiral staircase. On the top landing opens the is a door to the turret, followed by a small stone spiral leads to the upper room, which provides access to the terrace. To the left of the tower, on the first floor, a large Renaissance-style mullioned window was added in 1535. The colonnettes and mullion were later replaced by three caryatids, with pilasters decorated with arabesques.

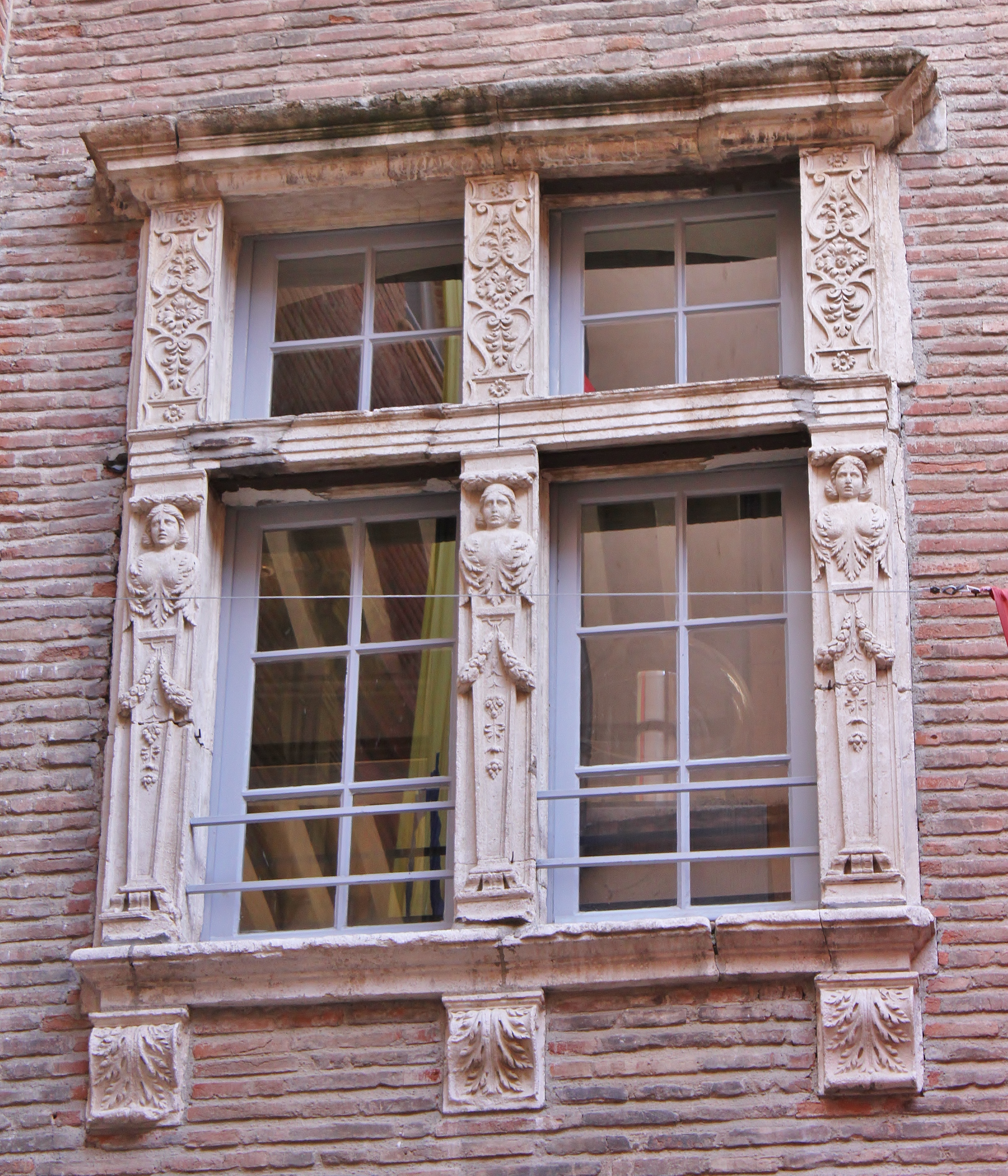
Caryatid window in the first courtyard.

At the back of the large ground floor room is a large fireplace adorned with columns and which features in the middle of its mantel a shield supported by two heraldic lions. This originally bore the arms of de Boysson, which the Pierre de Vignaux had scraped off after 1570 to replace with his own.

=== Second Courtyard ===
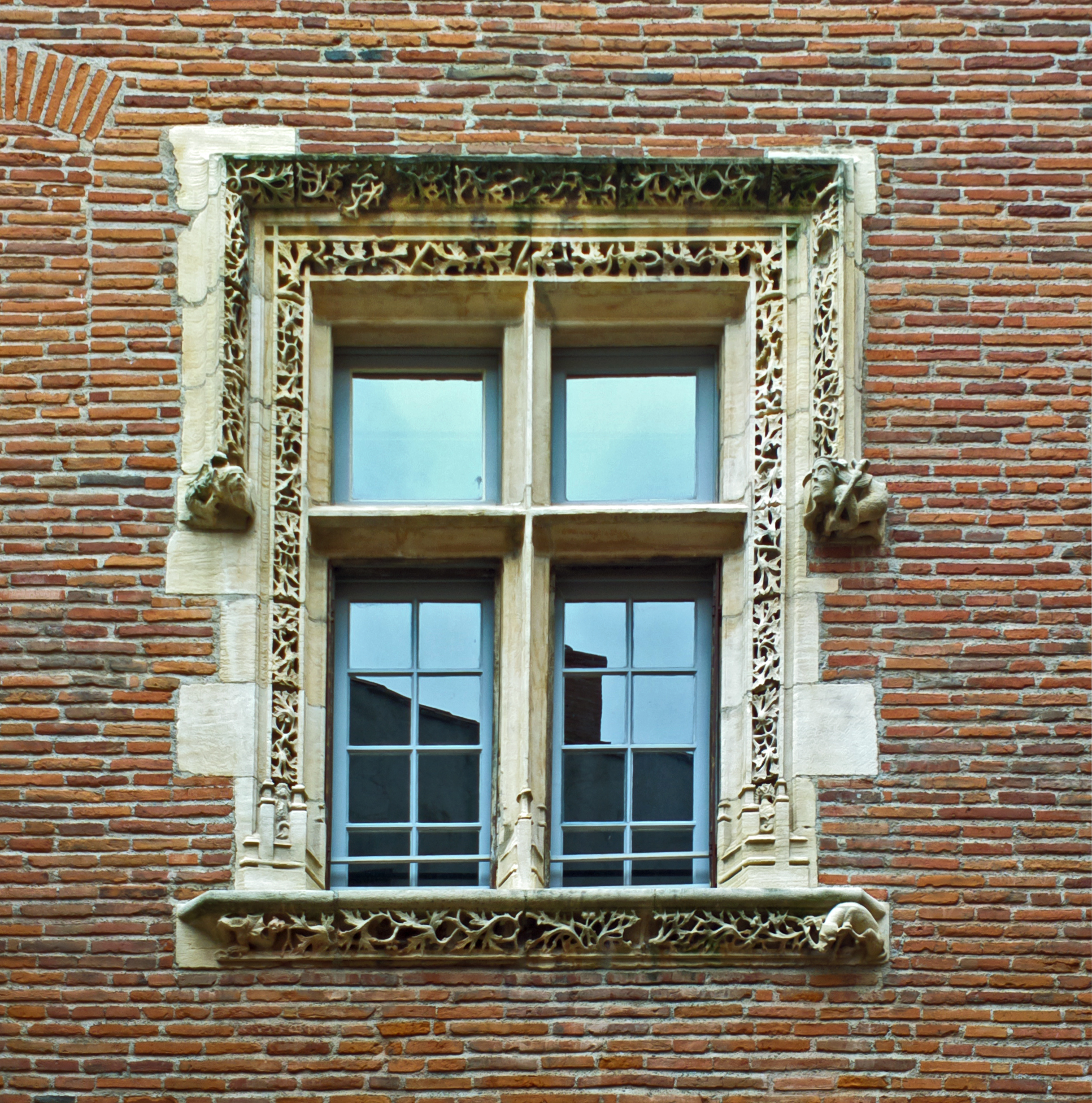
Mullion window in the second courtyard

This courtyard was once the garden of Hugues de Boysson's mansion, and on the east side, in the section belonging to the mansion, is a remarkable window: its Gothic frame is adorned with intricately carved thistle foliage.

The garden, however, was transformed by Jean de Cheverry. The new building he erected was placed against the old residence, separating the present courtyard from the garden. The arcaded gallery is supported by Doric stone columns. The doors and windows on the ground floor and the two upper floors, decorated with columns and pilasters, are typical of the Renaissance. The lower hall, with its sixteen-ribbed vault and double ribbed vaulting with liernes and tiercerons, is considered to be particularly historic.

== Pictures ==
Hôtel de Boysson-Cheverry

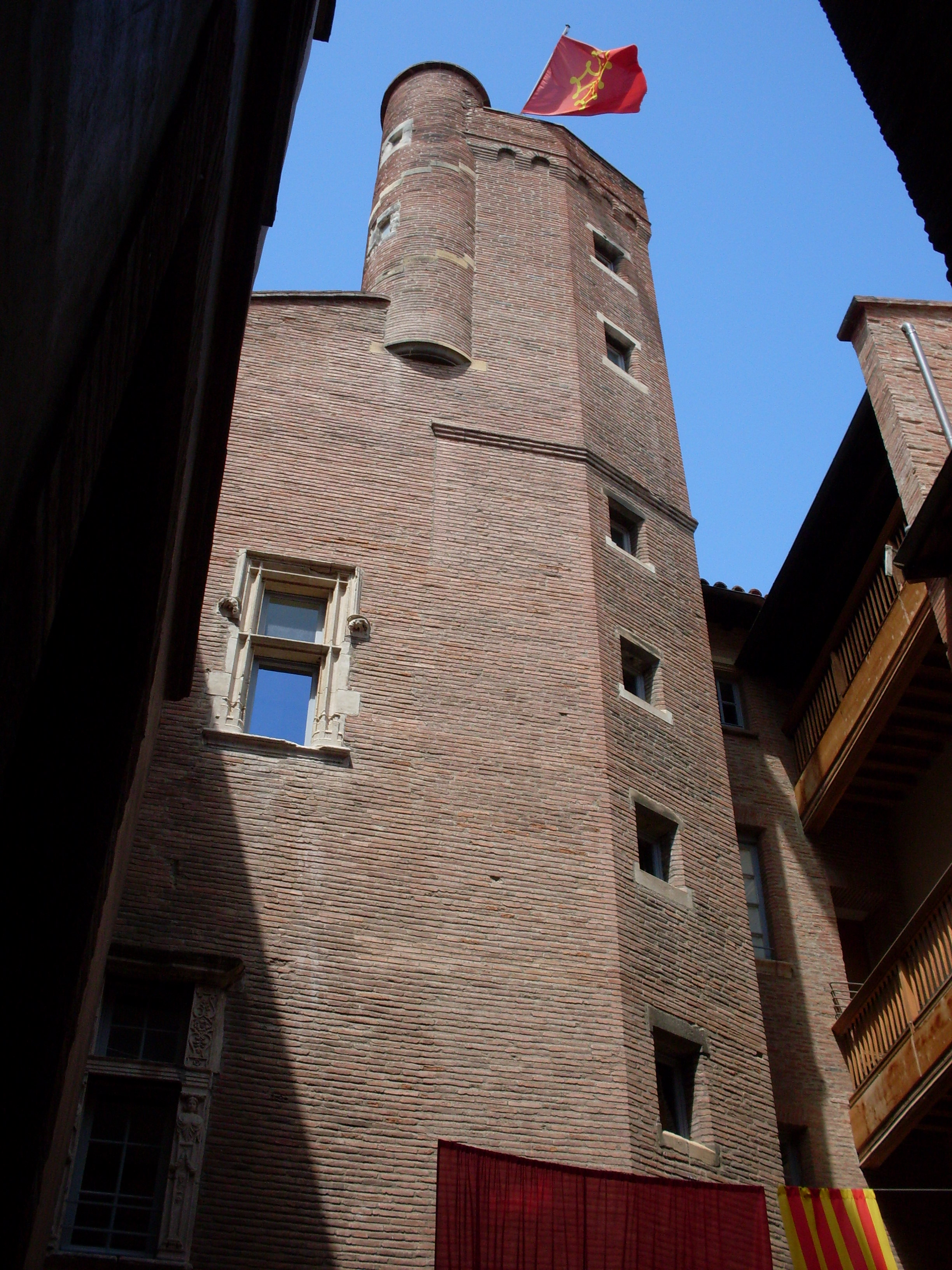

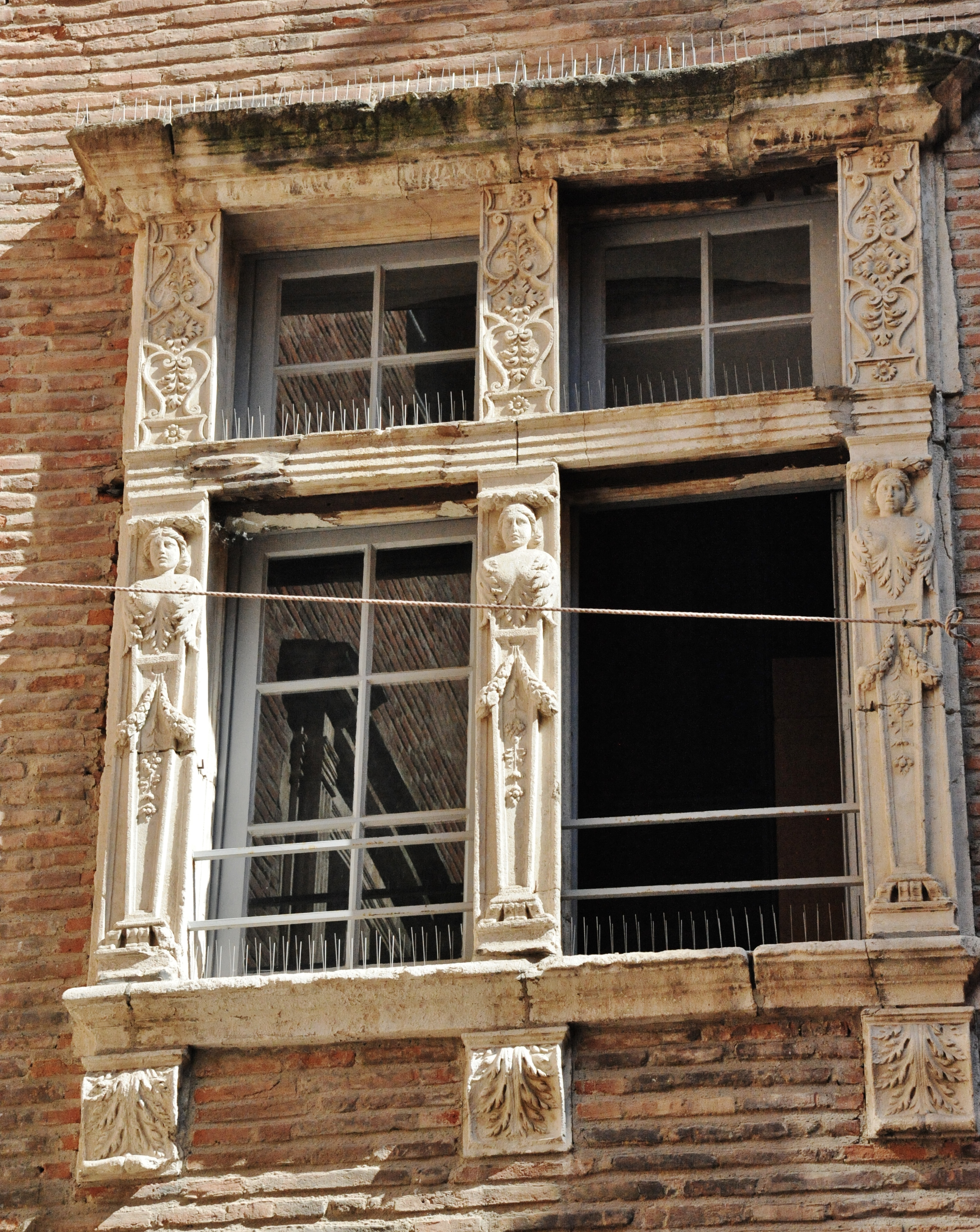

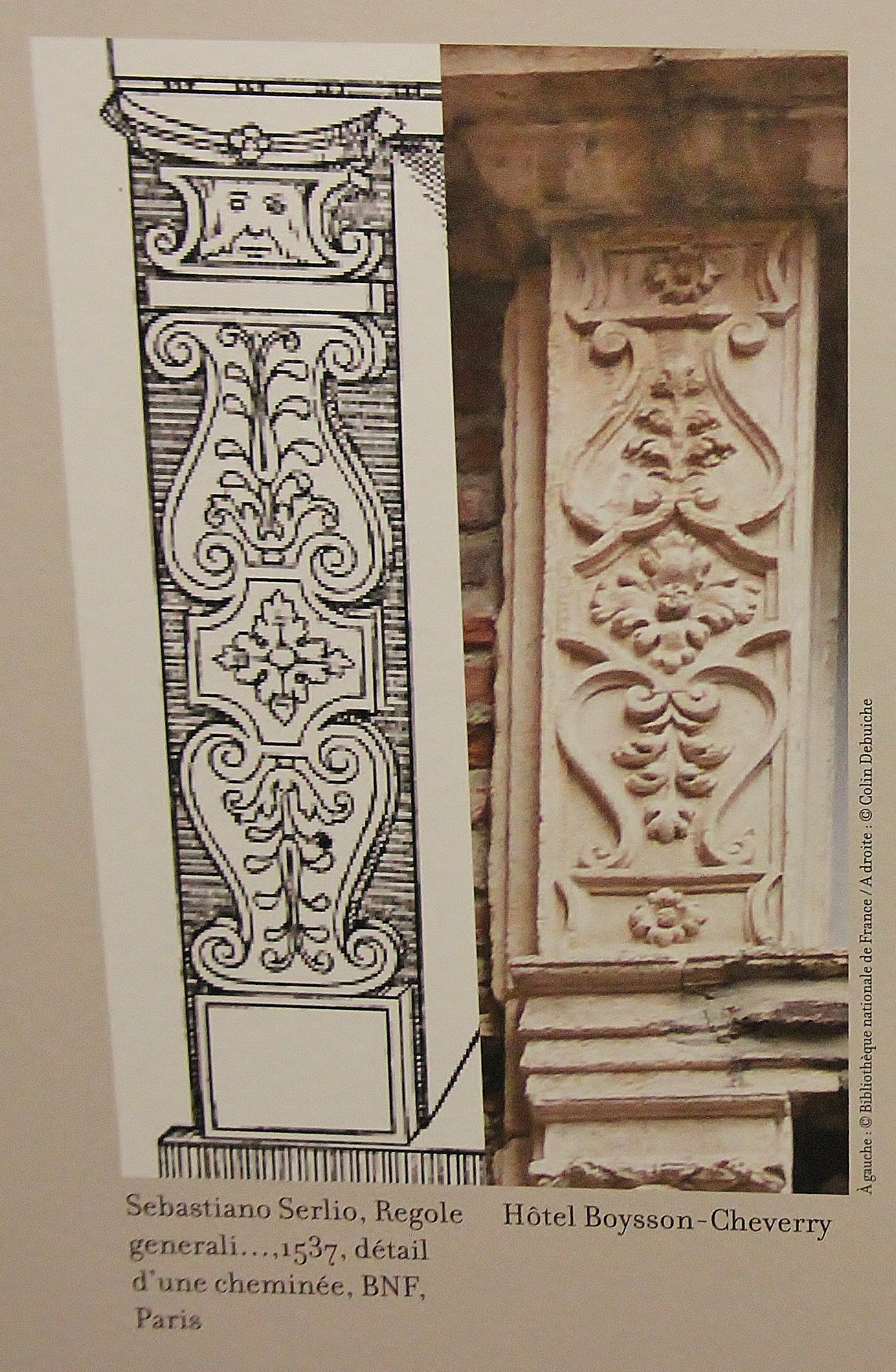

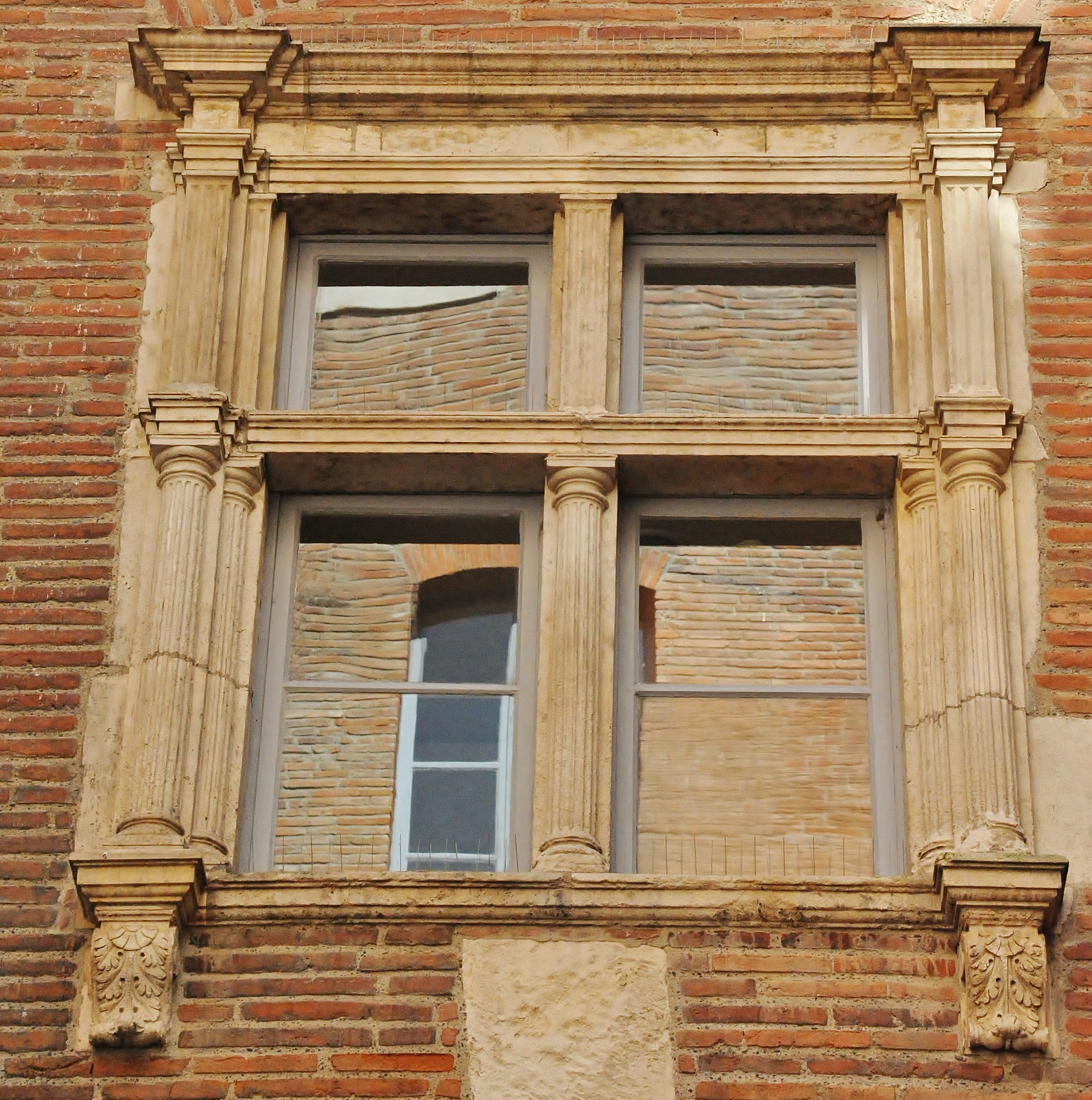

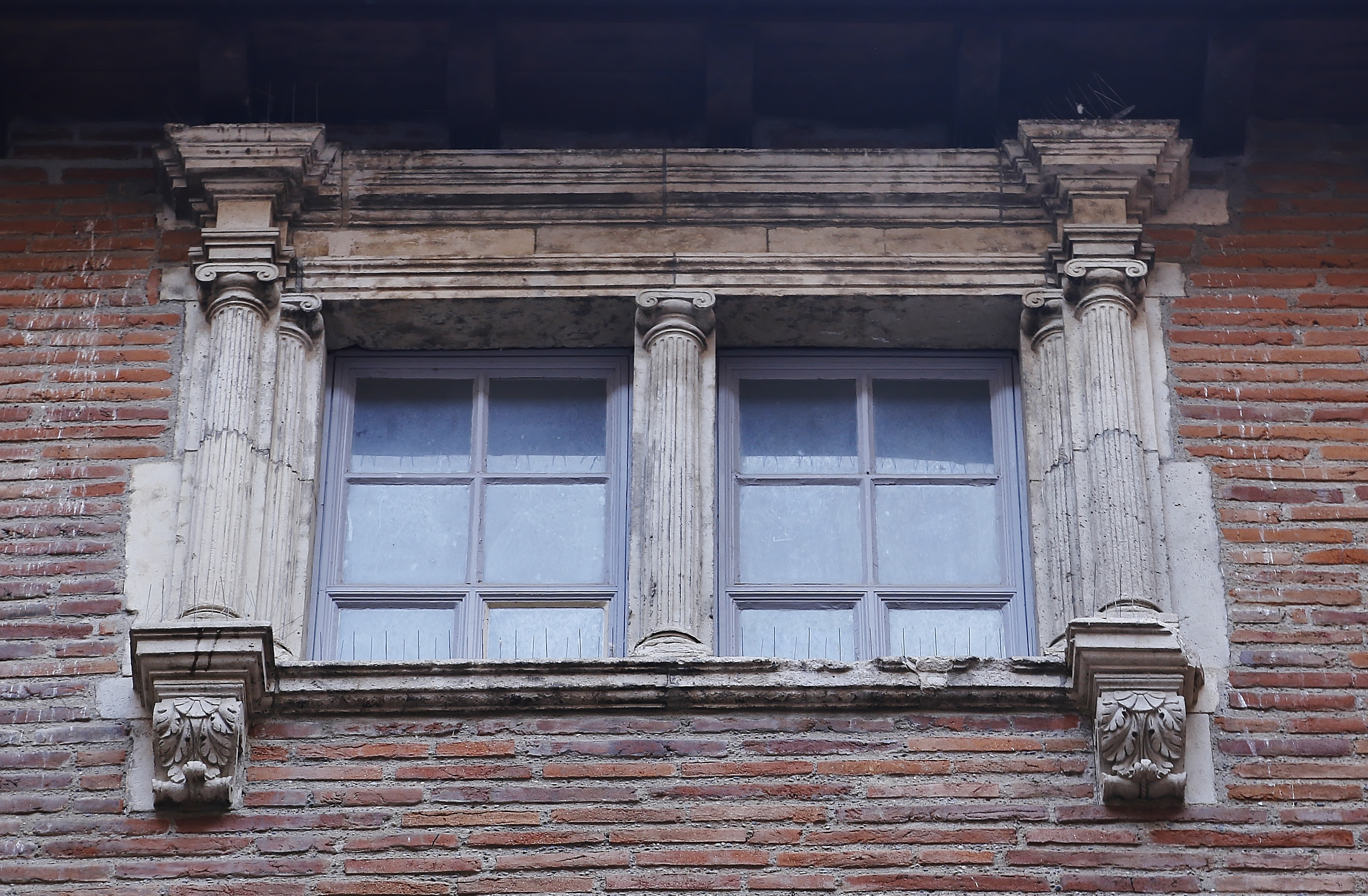

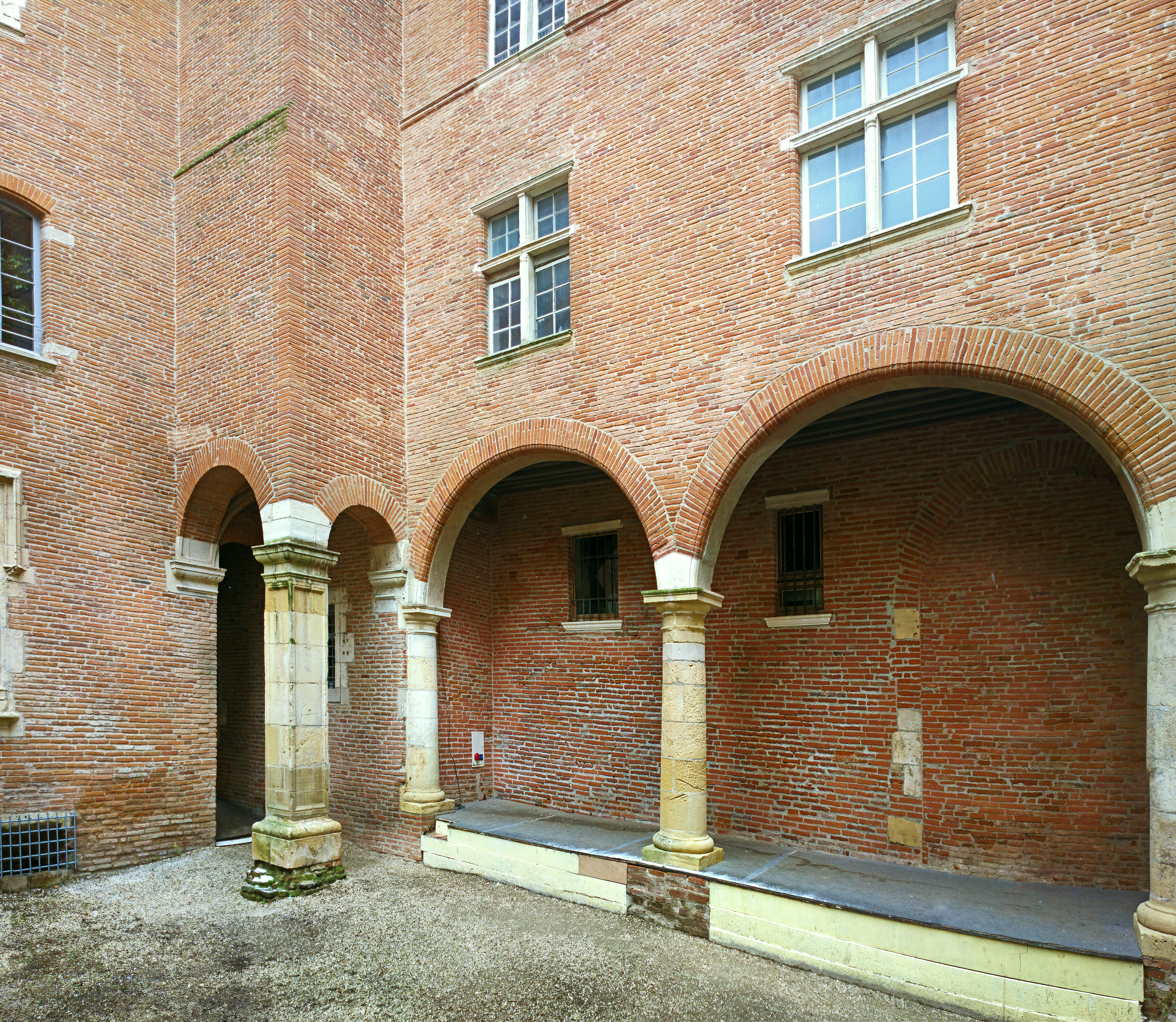

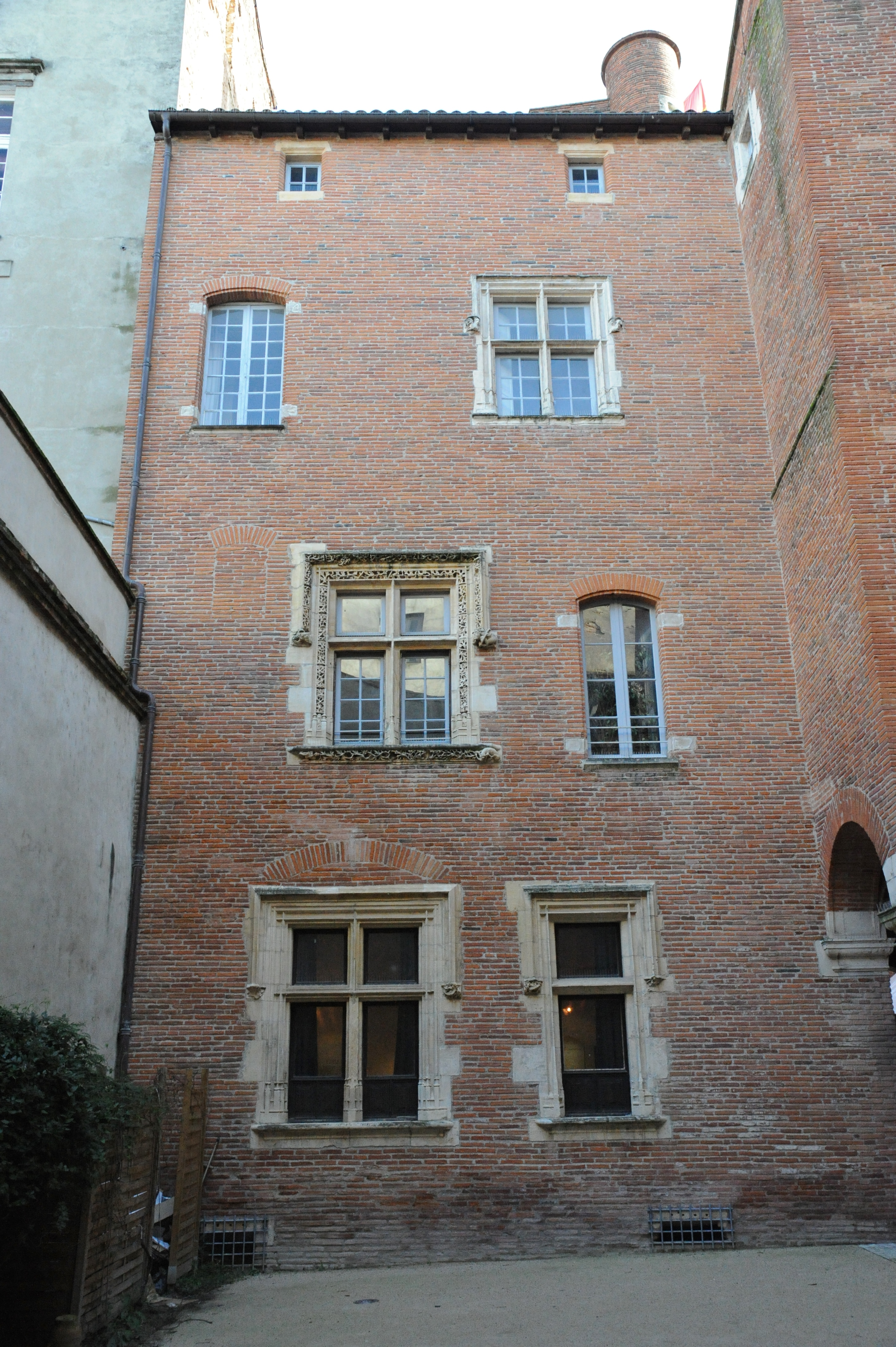

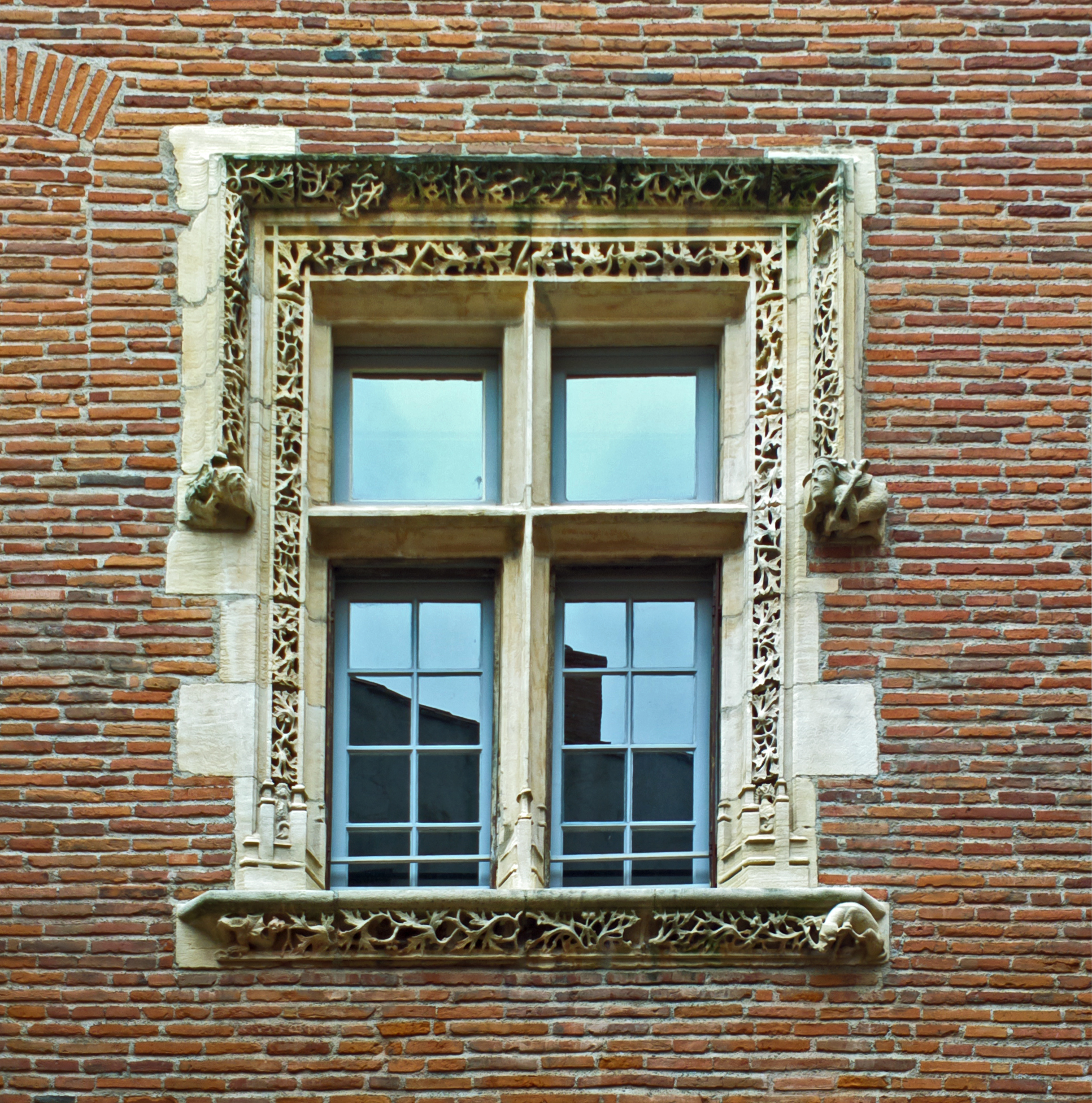

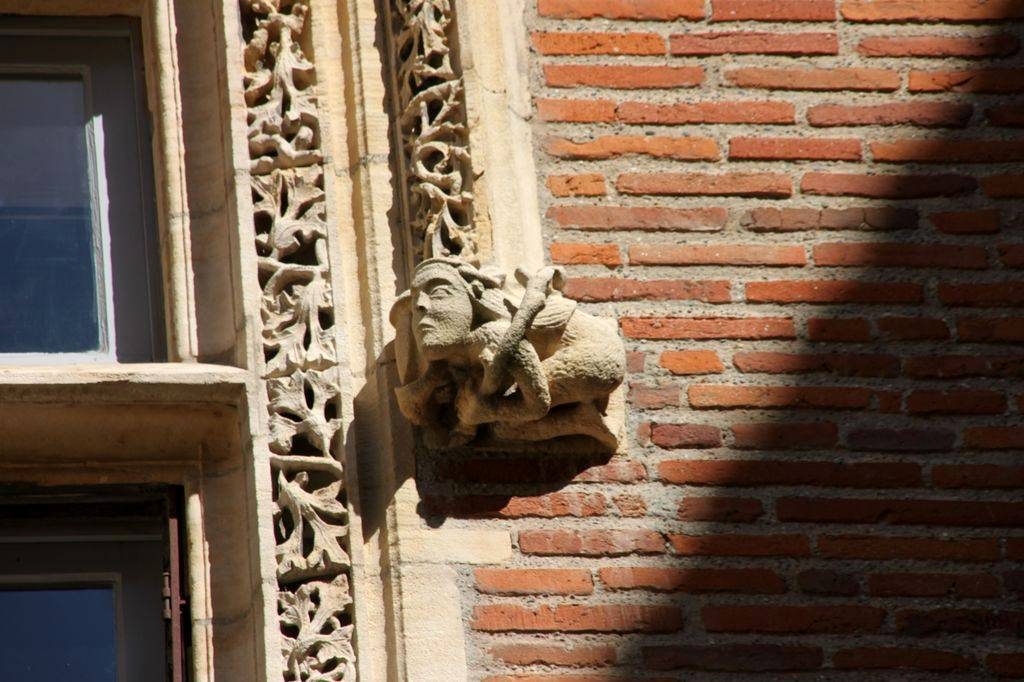

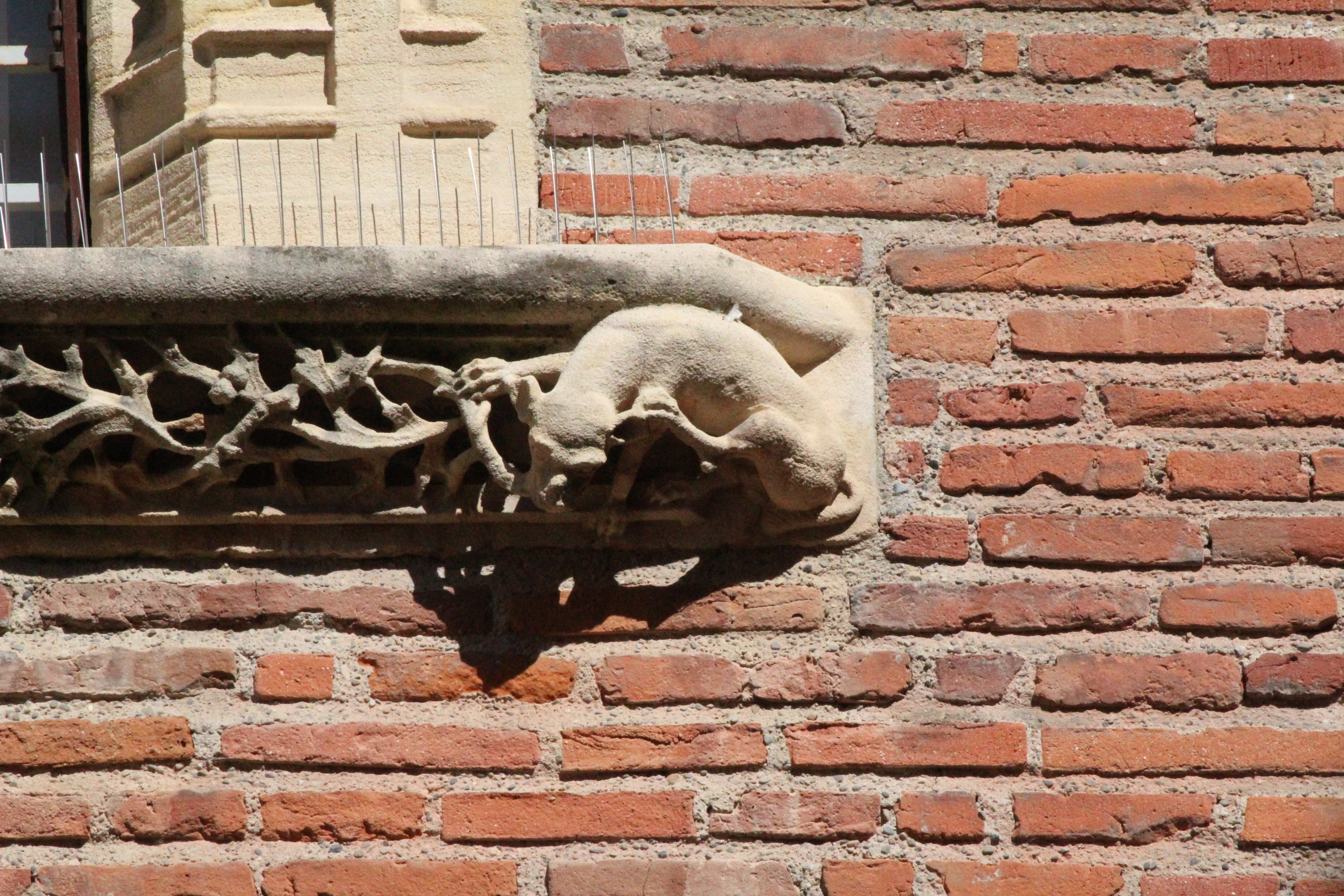

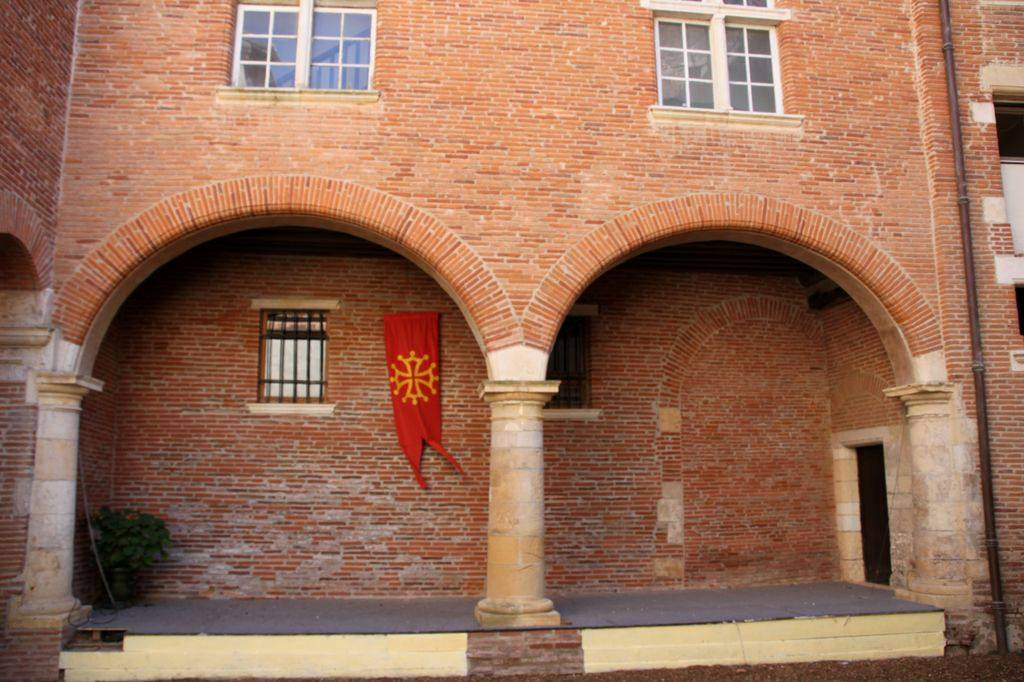

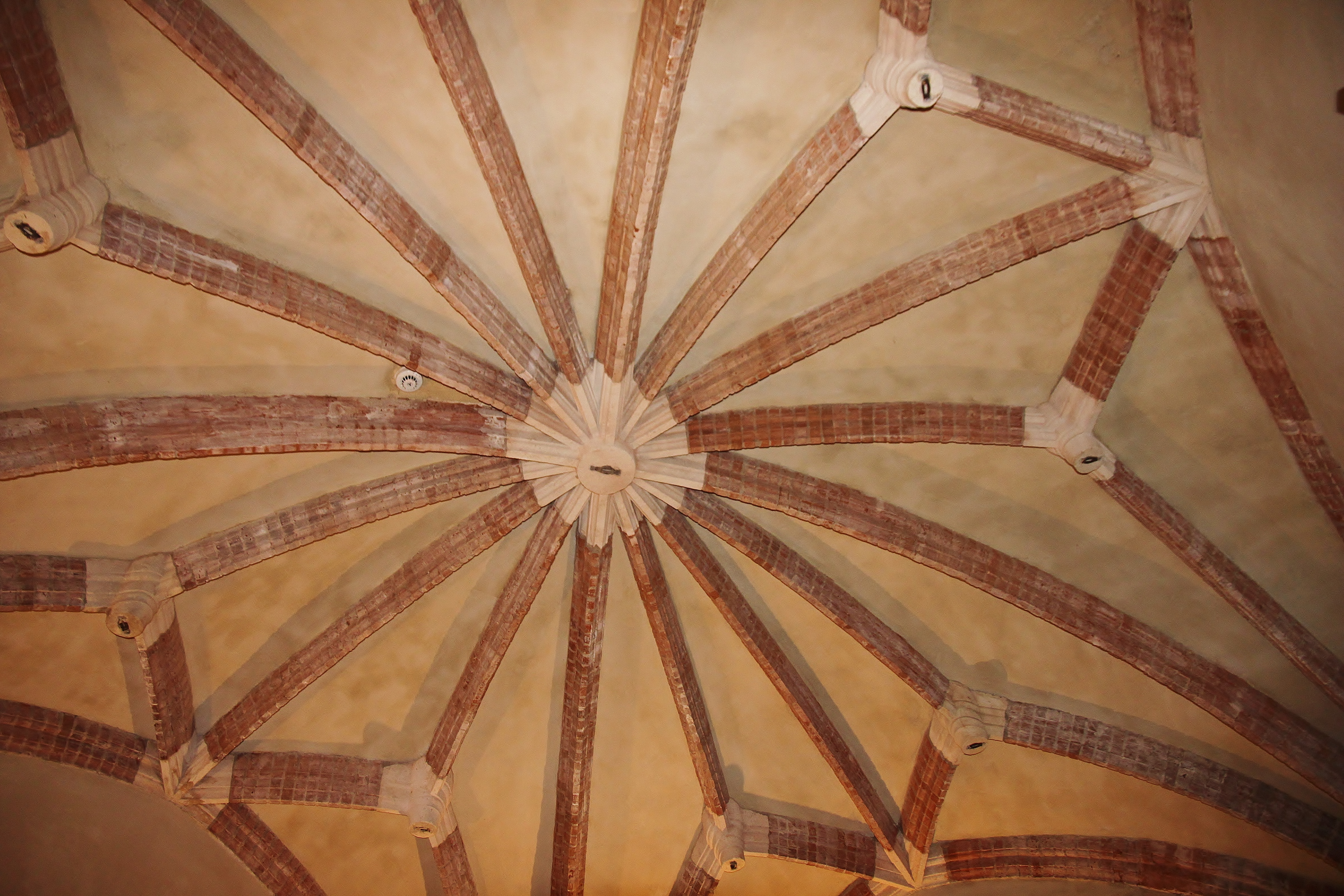

== See also ==
- Renaissance architecture of Toulouse

== Bibliography ==
- Guy Ahlsell de Toulza, Louis Peyrusse, Bruno Tollon, Hôtels et Demeures de Toulouse et du Midi Toulousain, Daniel Briand éditeur, Drémil Lafage, 1997
