= Château d'Heudicourt =

French Château in Eure, Normandy

- Heudicourt in France
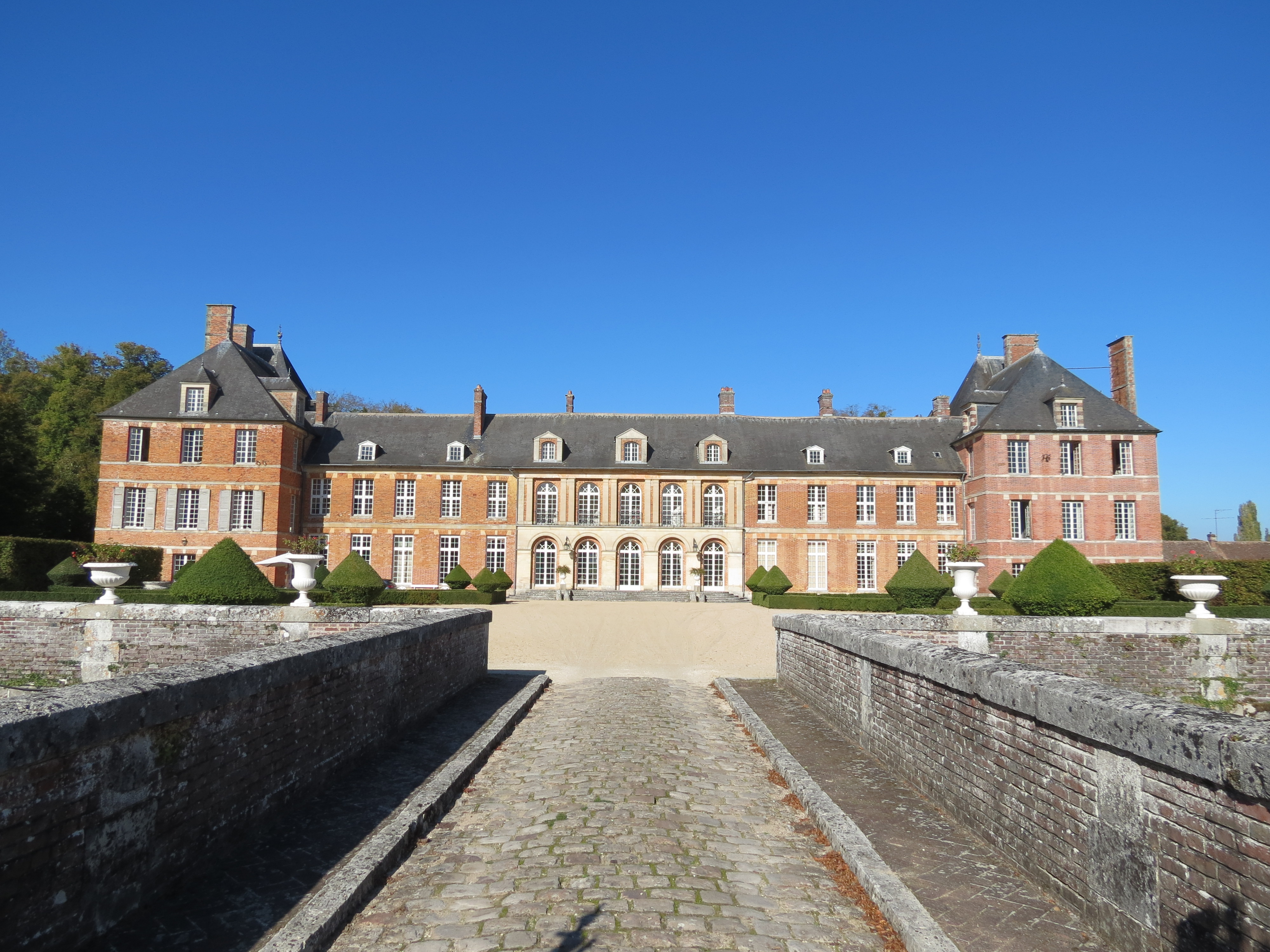
- The château from the entrance bridge

Site information
- Type: Château
- Owner: Yves Estève

Location
- Coordinates: 49°20′10″N 1°39′37″E

Site history
- Built: 1574

Garrison information
- Occupants: Michel Sublet

The château d'Heudicourt is a Château dating from the 16th century, which is located on the territory of the French commune of Heudicourt in the departement of Eure, in the Normandy region.

The château is classified as a Monument historique.

== Location ==
The castle is located, near the Saint-Sulpice church, in the commune of Heudicourt, in the French department of Eure.

== History ==
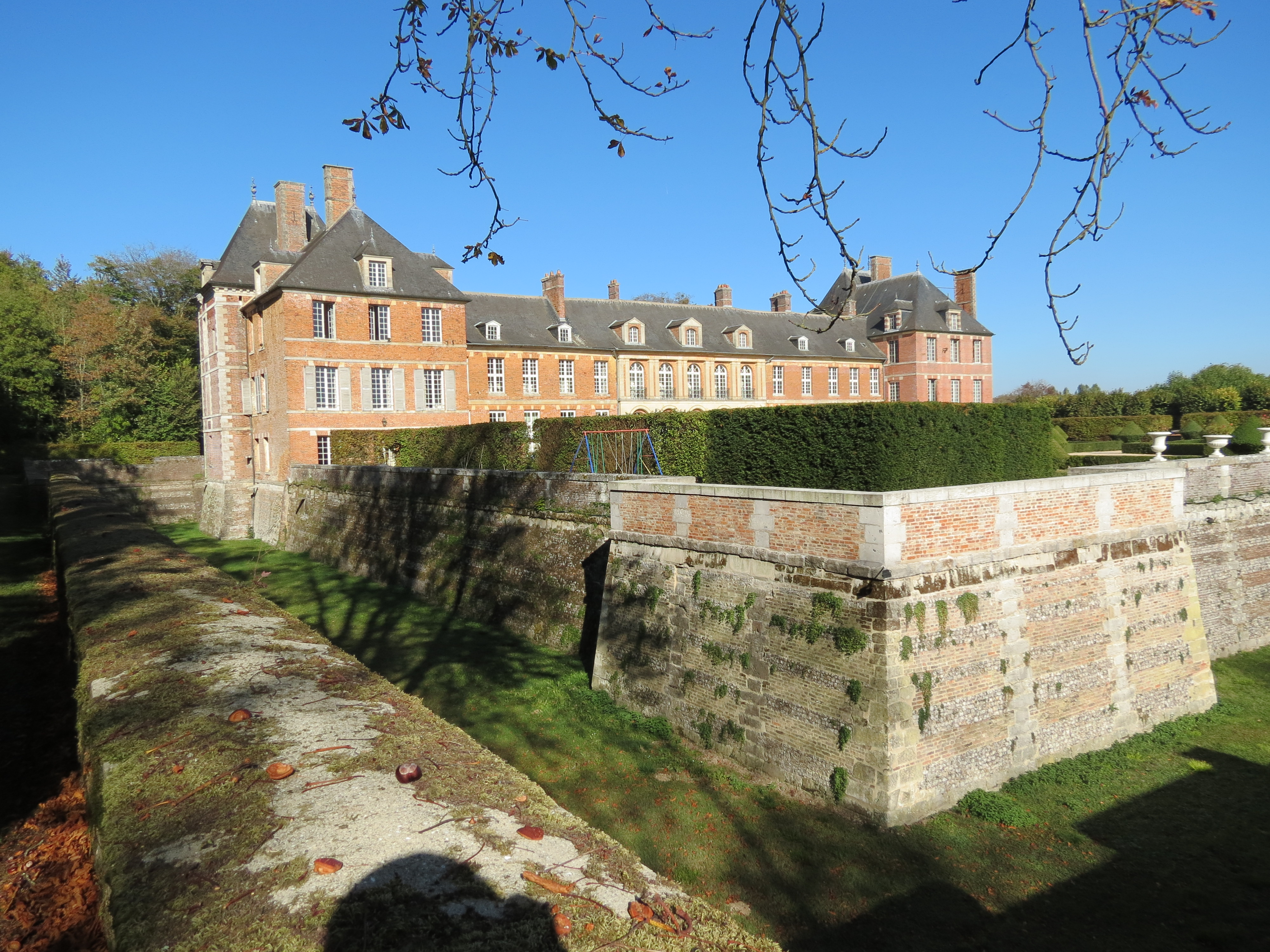
The château and its moat.

On its current site stood, at the time of Dagobert, according to tradition, a hunting rendezvous. The current château was built by Michel Sublet, steward of Marshal Joyeuse, and whose father, originally from Blois, had acquired the estate in 1574.

After the death of Michel Sublet, his son also named Michel, Grand Wolfcatcher Royal of France, completed the castle in around 1660. He married in 1666 Bonne de Pons, niece of Marshal d'Albret, a close friend of Madame de Maintenon. A painting by Mignard, kept at the château, represents them together.

The property then fell to Michel Sublet's son, Pons Auguste, and then to his daughter, Madame de Belzunce.

The Revolution made it a prison, and in 1798, Madame de Belzunce ceded the château to four Parisian nobles. She died in Gournay-en-Bray in 1803. A year later in 1804, the four nobles sold the property to Martin-Roch-Xavier Estève, who was Treasurer of the Government, and came from Languedoc. He undertook the restoration of château by raising the moats and the entrance bridge, and by levelling the side wings which were in ruins.

Estève who was promoted to Treasurer general of the Crown, was made Count of the Empire in 1809 by Napoleon. But in 1811, following a quarrel with the Emperor, he resigned and returned to his lands in Heudicourt.

The Estève family currently still owns the estate.

== Description ==
The château is built of brick and stone, with slate roofs.

Originally, the construction comprised four main buildings arranged around the current main courtyard, confined to square pavilions, and isolated by deep dry moats. Today, only the main building remains, rebuilt in the 18th century and fitted with a neoclassical style avant-corps by Count Martin-Roch Estève.

== Protection of historical monuments ==
The château, including the main courtyard, the moats and gardens are classified as Monument historique by the order of 17 October 1966.

== The park ==
The 14-hectare (35-acre) park is classically inspired. Its plans were drawn up at the end of the 17th century, with groves, star shaped alleys, open air theatre, perspectives towards the surrounding countryside protected by jumps-de-loup.

In the 19th century, a garden of medicinal plants had been laid out to supply herbs to the castle pharmacy.

The storm of 1999 caused the fall of the old alignments and the large cedars planted near the castle. These were reconstituted by planting several hundred trees and various species.
