= Treasurer general of France =

Officer of the French Ancien Régime

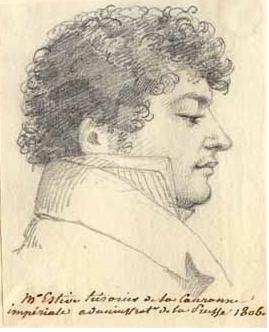
Martin-Roch-Xavier Estève in 1806

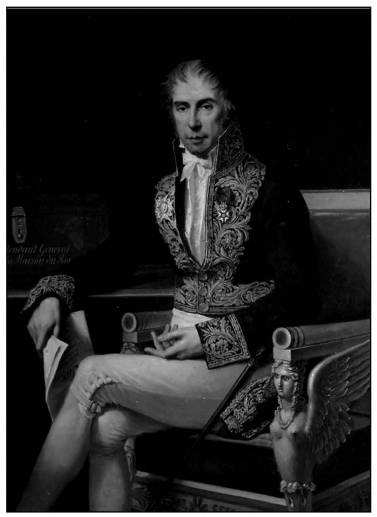
François Roullet de La Bouillerie

The post of treasurer general of France was a finance office of the French administration of the Ancien Régime.

== History ==
The treasurer generals of France were the heirs of the Treasurers of France and the Generals of France, offices of finance created in medieval times and united in 1577. The general treasurers of France had as a function the management of finances in an administrative jurisdiction called generality. They had as a form of organisation the Bureau des finances, established from 1577.

Their function of financial management was important only before the establishment of the intendants . The most important function retained by the Treasurer generals was that of the management of the royal domain. The office however offered the advantage of gradual nobility, comfortable wages, and a remuneration indexed to the sums handled by the treasurer general. Paul II Ardier, Jean de la Bruyère, Racine et Du Cange were treasurer generals.

The "inflationary" royal policy in terms of offices caused them to multiply and thus lose their prestige, this office remaining highly sought after as it conferred nobility.

=== Under Napoleon ===
Under Napoleon, the Treasurer General, an officer of the house, was the principal administrator of the funds in paid by the State under the civil list. Martin-Roch-Xavier Estève held the position of Treasurer General until 1811. Napoleon had known him in Italy in 1796. Estève later held several offices until being appointed treasurer of the government in 1801 and Treasurer General of the Crown in 1804. However alterations in Estève's his health began to worry Napoleon, as Napoleon thought he could not keep a diminished man in service. After a dispute, Estève resigned and retired to Château d'Heudicourt. In December 1811, Estève was replaced by François Roullet de La Bouillerie. Napoleon had already appointed La Bouillerie to the position of Treasurer of the Extraordinary Estate. La Bouillerie was accustomed to delicate missions since he had taken care of contributions from Prussia. Additionally, it was easier to entrust the Estate's cash registers to the same treasurer. The general treasury had sixty two employees in 1812. The treasurer was assisted by a director of accounts and inspector.
