= Heudicourt, Eure =

Heudicourt
- Commune
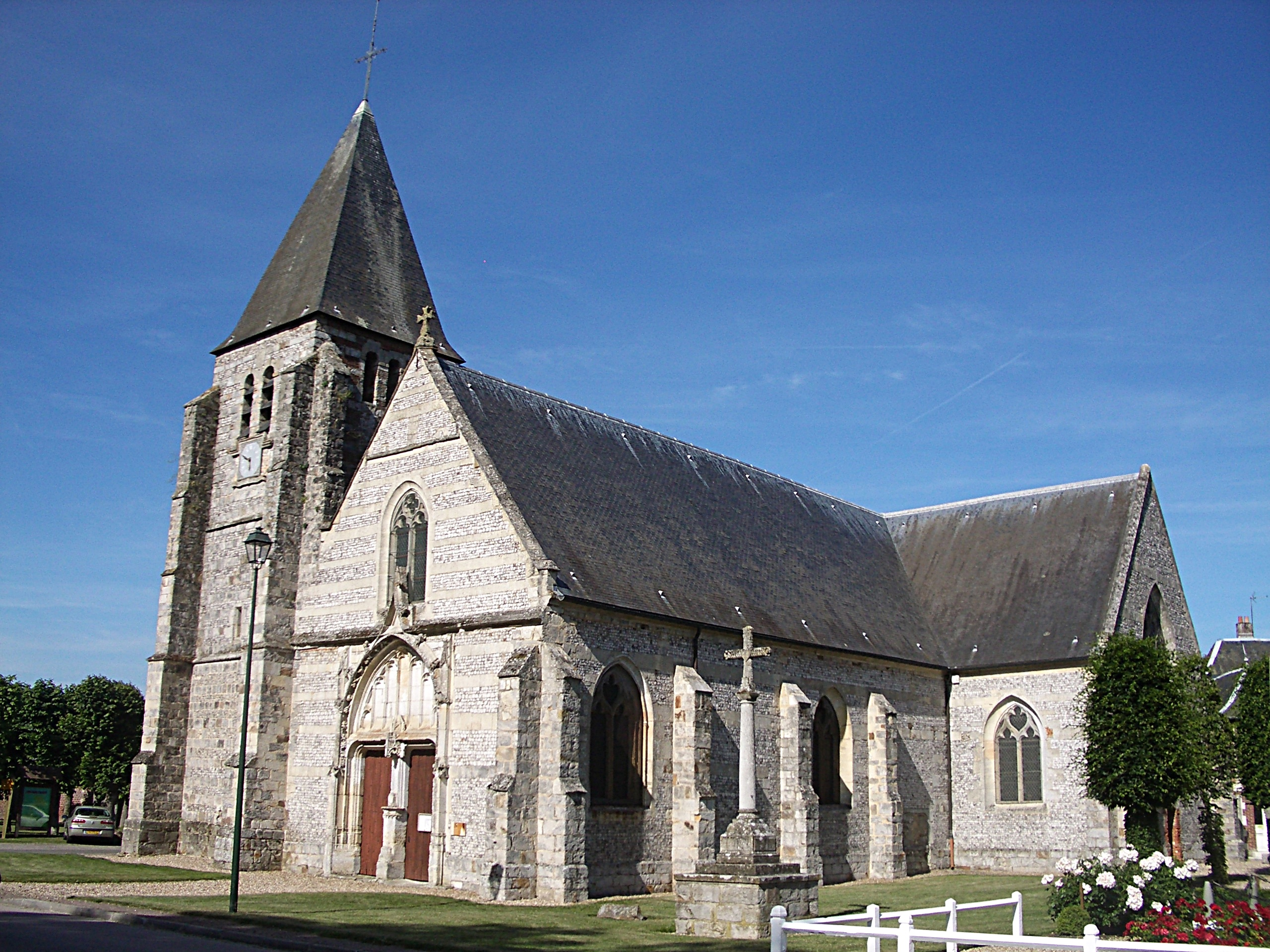
- The church in Heudicourt
- Location of Heudicourt
- Location within France Location within Normandy
- Coordinates: 49°20′17″N 1°39′39″E
- Country: France
- Region: Normandy
- Department: Eure
- Arrondissement: Les Andelys
- Canton: Gisors

Government
  - Mayor (2020–2026): Jean-Jacques Bouche
- Area^{1}: 10.73 km^{2} (4.14 sq mi)
- Elevation: 120 m (390 ft)
- Highest elevation: 123 m (404 ft)
- Lowest elevation: 87 m (285 ft)
- Population (2023): 713
  - Density: 66.4/km^{2} (172/sq mi)
- Time zone: UTC+01:00 (CET)
  - Summer (DST): UTC+02:00 (CEST)
- INSEE/Postal code: 27333 /27860
- ^{1} French Land Register data, which excludes lakes, ponds, glaciers > 1 km^{2} (0.386 sq mi or 247 acres) and river estuaries.

Heudicourt (French pronunciation: [ødikuʁ]) is a commune in the Eure department in northern France.

== Population ==
Historical population
Year	Pop.	±% p.a.
1968	441	—
1975	389	−1.78%
1982	392	+0.11%
1990	519	+3.57%
1999	535	+0.34%
2007	609	+1.63%
2012	638	+0.93%
2017	684	+1.40%
2023	713	+0.69%
Source: INSEE

== See also ==
- Communes of the Eure department
