= Guitry (disambiguation) =

Guitry can refer to:

- Guitry, a town in France
- Guitry, Ivory Coast, a town

- Guitry Department, a department of Ivory Coast containing this town

- Guitry (name), which can be both a masculine given name and a surname
