= Marguerite de la Sablière =

French scientist

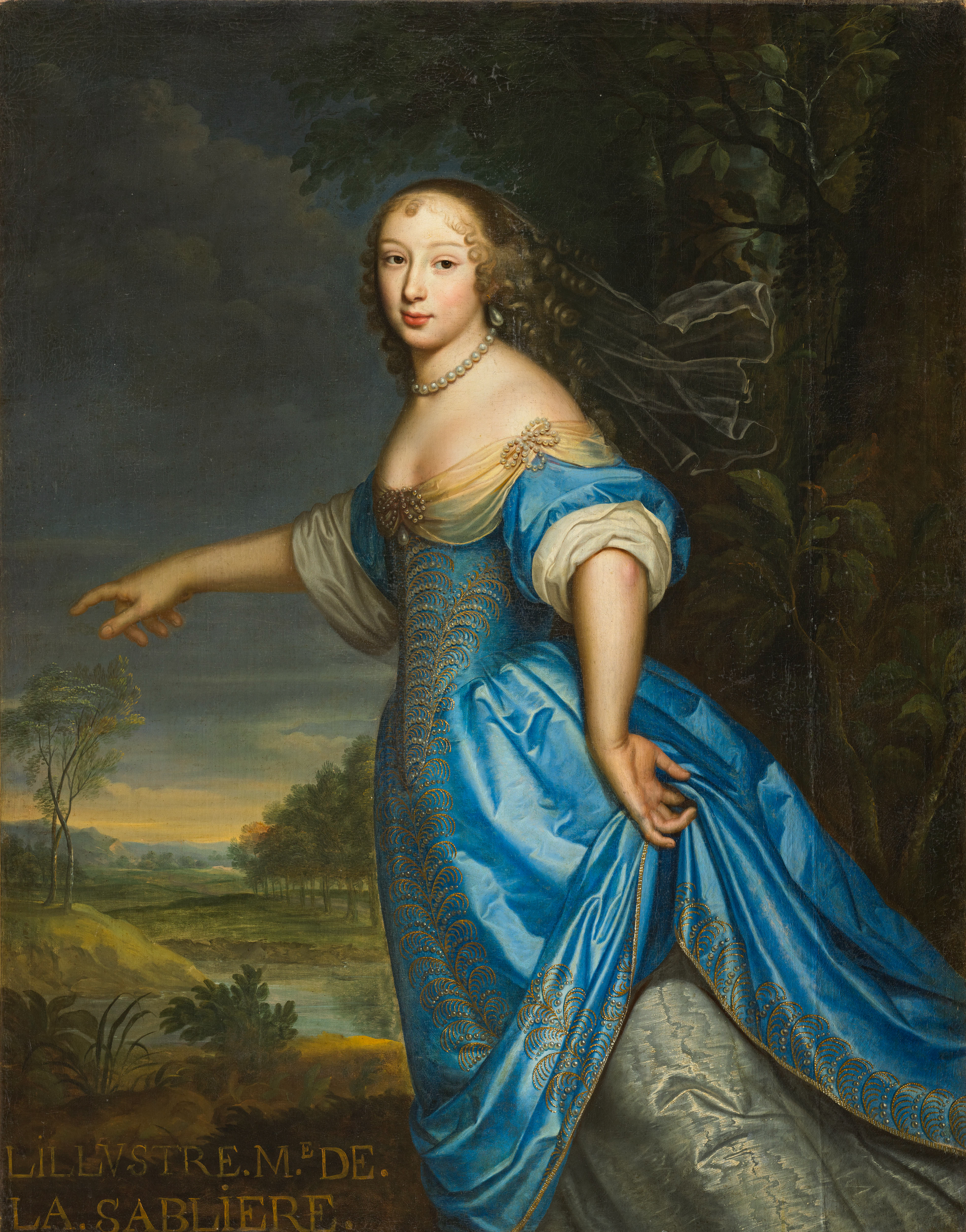
- Born: Marguerite Hessein; 1640
- Died: 8 January 1693 (aged 52–53)
- Spouse: Antoine de Rambouillet
- Scientific career
- Fields: mathematics, physics, astronomy, philosophy, history, writing

Marguerite de la Sablière (French pronunciation: [maʁɡ(ə)ʁit də la sablijɛʁ]; c. 1640 – 8 January 1693), was a French salonist and polymath, friend and patron of Jean de La Fontaine, was the wife of Antoine Rambouillet, sieur de la Sablière (1624–1679), a Protestant financier and poet entrusted with the administration of the royal estates, her maiden name being Marguerite Hessein.

== Biography ==
She received an education in Latin, mathematics, physics and anatomy from the best scholars of her time. For example, Joseph Sauveur and Gilles Personne de Roberval taught her mathematics, physics, and astronomy. Her house became a meeting-place for poets, scientists and men of letters, no less than for members of the court of Louis XIV.

About 1673 de la Sablière received into her house La Fontaine, whom for twenty years she relieved of every kind of material anxiety. Another friend and inmate of the house was the traveller and physician François Bernier, whose abridgment of the works of Gassendi was written for Mme de la Sablière. The abbé Chaulieu and his fellow-poet, Charles Auguste, marquis de La Fare, were among her most intimate associates.

Nicolas Boileau-Despréaux mocked her scientific pretensions in his Satire contre les femmes holding an astrolabe, her efforts to observe Jupiter were portrayed as weakening her sight and ruining her complexion. In reply, Charles Perrault's Apologie des femmes defended her.

La Fare sold his commission in the army to be able to spend his time with her. This liaison, which seems to have been the only serious passion of her life, was broken in 1679. La Fare was seduced from his allegiance, according to Mme de Sevigné by his love of play, but to this must be added a new passion for the actress La Champmeslé.

Mme de la Sablière thenceforward gave more and more attention to good works, much of her time being spent in the hospital for incurables. Her husband's death in the same year increased her serious tendencies, and she was presently converted to Roman Catholicism. She died in Paris on 8 January 1693.

== Milk in tea ==
She was credited with starting the custom of putting milk into tea in her salon, allegedly to prevent her eggshell teacups from cracking.

== Publications ==
- de la Sabliere, Marguerite (1705). Reflexions ou Sentences et Maximes morales de Monsieur de la Rochefoucault.

== See also ==
- Timeline of women in science
