= Philippe Charles de La Fare =

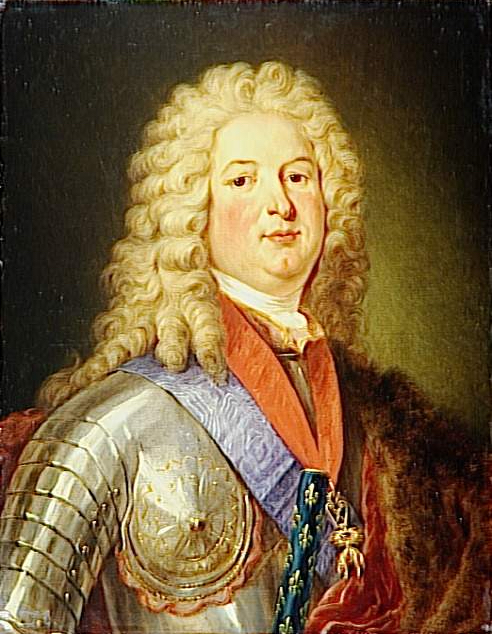
- Philippe Charles de La Fare
- Born: 15 February 1687; Paris, France
- Died: 14 September 1752 (aged 65) Paris, France
- Allegiance: Kingdom of France
- Branch: 2nd Marquis de La Fare; Count of Laugère; Lieutenant General to the Government of Languedoc (1718); Gouvernor of the château and city of Alès; French Ambassador to Spain; Lieutenant General of Upper Brittany and Conte of Nantois (1738); Chevalier d'Honneur of Infanta Maria Teresa Rafaela of Spain; Governor of Gravelines and of Alès; Chevalier d'honneur of the Dauphine Marie Josèphe of Saxony
- Service years: 1687–1752
- Rank: maréchal de France
- Commands: Régiment d'Auvergne; Régiment de Normandie; Commander in chief of Régiment de Languedoc (1724)

Philippe Charles de La Fare, 2nd Marquis of La Fare and, 4th Marquis of Monclar, Count of Laugères, (15 February 1687 – 14 September 1752 in Paris), was a Marshal of France.

== Early life ==
La Fare, born on 15 February 1687, was the eldest son of Charles Auguste de la Fare, captain of the guards of Philippe of France (1640–1701), and Louise Jeanne de Lux (1667–1691). He was the brother of Étienne Joseph de La Fare, Bishop of Laon, and the cousin of cardinals Anne Louis Henri de La Fare and François-Joachim de Pierre de Bernis.

== Military career ==
=== Reign of Louis XIV ===
==== Musketeer (1701–1702) ====
In 1701, the War of the Spanish Succession began. The war opposed from 1701 to 1714, Louis XIV's France, allied to Bavaria and the electorate of Cologne, to the rest of Europe : Great Britain, Holland, Austria, Prussia, Hanover, Portugal and Savoie.

Philippe Charles was 14 years of age, and on 26 March 1693 became a musketeer of the King by Philippe of France, Duke of Orléans (only brother of King Louis XIV) and Elisabeth Charlotte of the Palatinate, Princess Palatine, Duchess of Orléans.

==== Régiment du Roi (1703) ====
He was named sous-lieutenant to the Régiment du Roi, and was involved in the taking of Breisach by the Duke of Bourgogne, on 6 September 1703. As lieutenant, he is present at the Battle of Speyerbach won by Marshal Tallard, and participated in the taking of Landau.

==== Régiment d'Auvergne (1704) ====
Philippe Charles de La Fare campaigned with the army of Moselle as ensign of the colonelle compagnie of the Régiment du Roi. He became captain in the same regiment.

He passed the beginning of 1704 in Italy, and acceded to the command of the régiment d'Auvergne in April 1704, after the dismissal of the Vicomte of Poudenx.

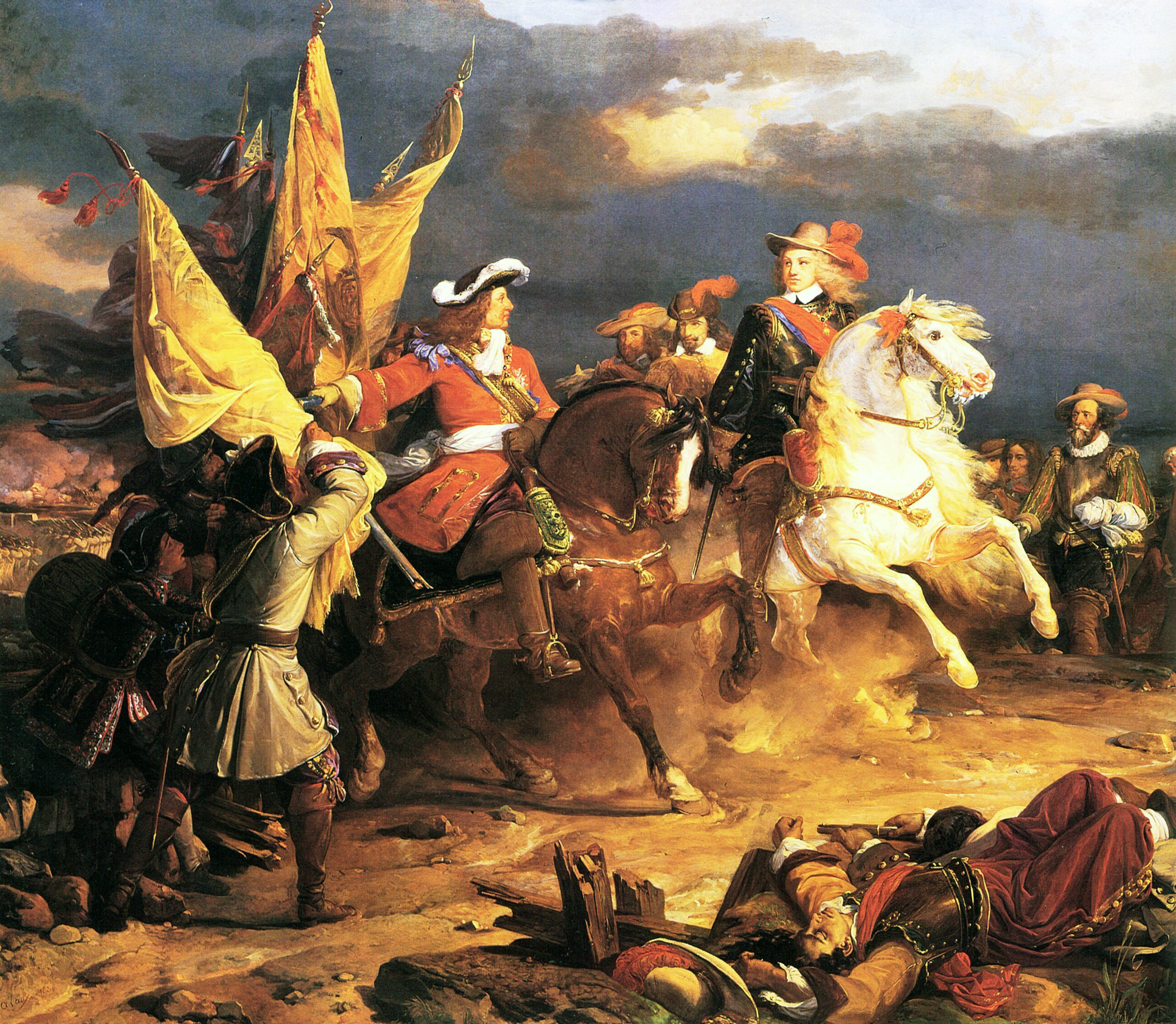
Le Grand Vendôme, the friend of his father, and Philip V of Spain

==== Under the Marshal-Duke of Vendôme ====
The friend of his father, Duke of Vendôme, was one of the last leaders of war in the Kingdom of France. He wanted to mount a surprise assault on the strong fortifications of Vercelli, but the detachment to this expedition arrives too late and the project is aborted.

La Fare then followed the Marshal-Duke of Vendôme who places a siege around Ivrea. Despite the courage of the defenders, because of lack of aid, the city surrendered. Vendôme and La Fare, after this siege, begin a siege on Verrue.

The Duke of Savoie after these defeats was in a precarious situation. La Fare was also present at the siege of Mirandola. He has an important role to play in all the military affairs engaged by the army in Italy.

== Death ==
La Fare died on 14 September 1752 in Paris.
