= Ecos =

Ecos or ECOS may refer to:

- Écos, a commune in Eure department, France
- eCos, an operating system
- ECOS (BANC magazine), published by the British Association of Nature Conservationists
- ECOS (CSIRO magazine), published by the Australian Commonwealth Scientific and Industrial Research Organisation
- Earth Friendly Products, a green cleaning products manufacturer which largely conducts business under the name ECOS.
- European Conodont Symposia

== See also ==
- Eco (disambiguation)
