= Charles Auguste de la Fare =

Charles Auguste, 1st Marquis of La Fare, Count of Laugères, Baron of Balazuc (1644–1712), was a nobleman, poet and French memorialist.

== Biography ==
La Fare, born at Valgorge located in Vivarais within Languedoc in 1644, was the son of Charles de La Fare and Jacqueline de Borne.

La Fare was captain of the bodyguards of Philippe of Orléans. He entered his military career and served with distinction with the Maréchal de Turenne, with whom he became friends, during the campaigns of 1667 and 1674. A love rivalry with Louvois, secretary of War, concerning Madame de Rochefort, forced him to quit his service in the military.

La Fare fell in love with Marguerite de la Sablière, until he broke with her in 1679, and also had a short romance with Marie Champmeslé. He lived a lazy Epicurean life and was an amateur of good food. He also attended the literary salons and festivals at the Château de Sceaux, organised by the Duchess of Maine. His friend Guillaume Amfrye de Chaulieu said of him that he was "made up of feelings and pleasure, full of amiable weakness". He died in Paris in 1712.

== Works ==
La Fare's poetry reflected his lifestyle. His verses praised the charms of rest and pleasure and were, according to the author, composed only for pleasure and without purpose.

- He wrote the libretto for an opera, Panthea, put on music by Philippe d'Orléans, Duke of Orléans.
- His Poems were collected in volume in 1755.
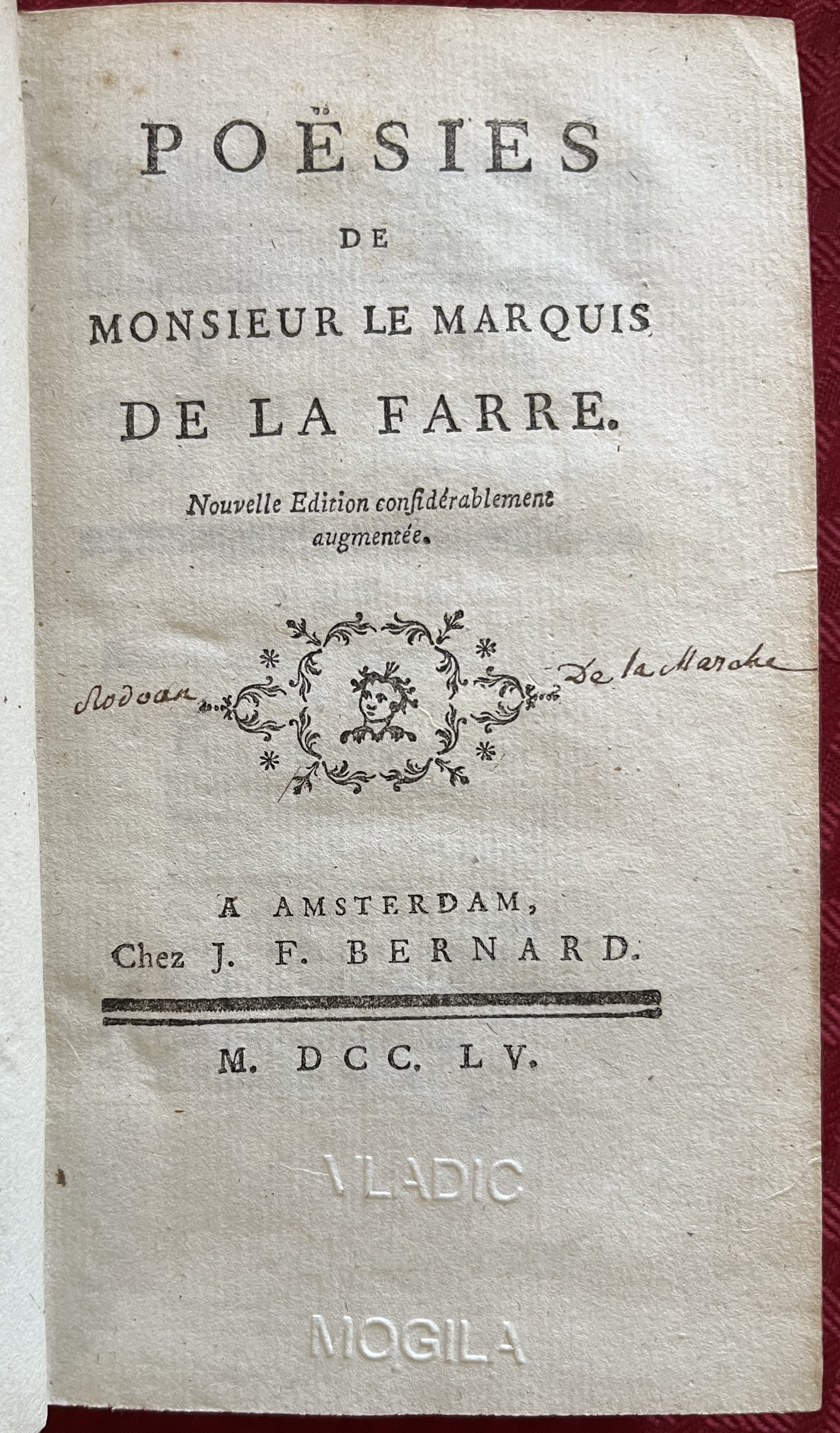
  Poësies de Monsieur le Marquis de La Farre.
- His memoirs of the principal events of the reign of Louis XIV (1715), are precise and full of finesse.
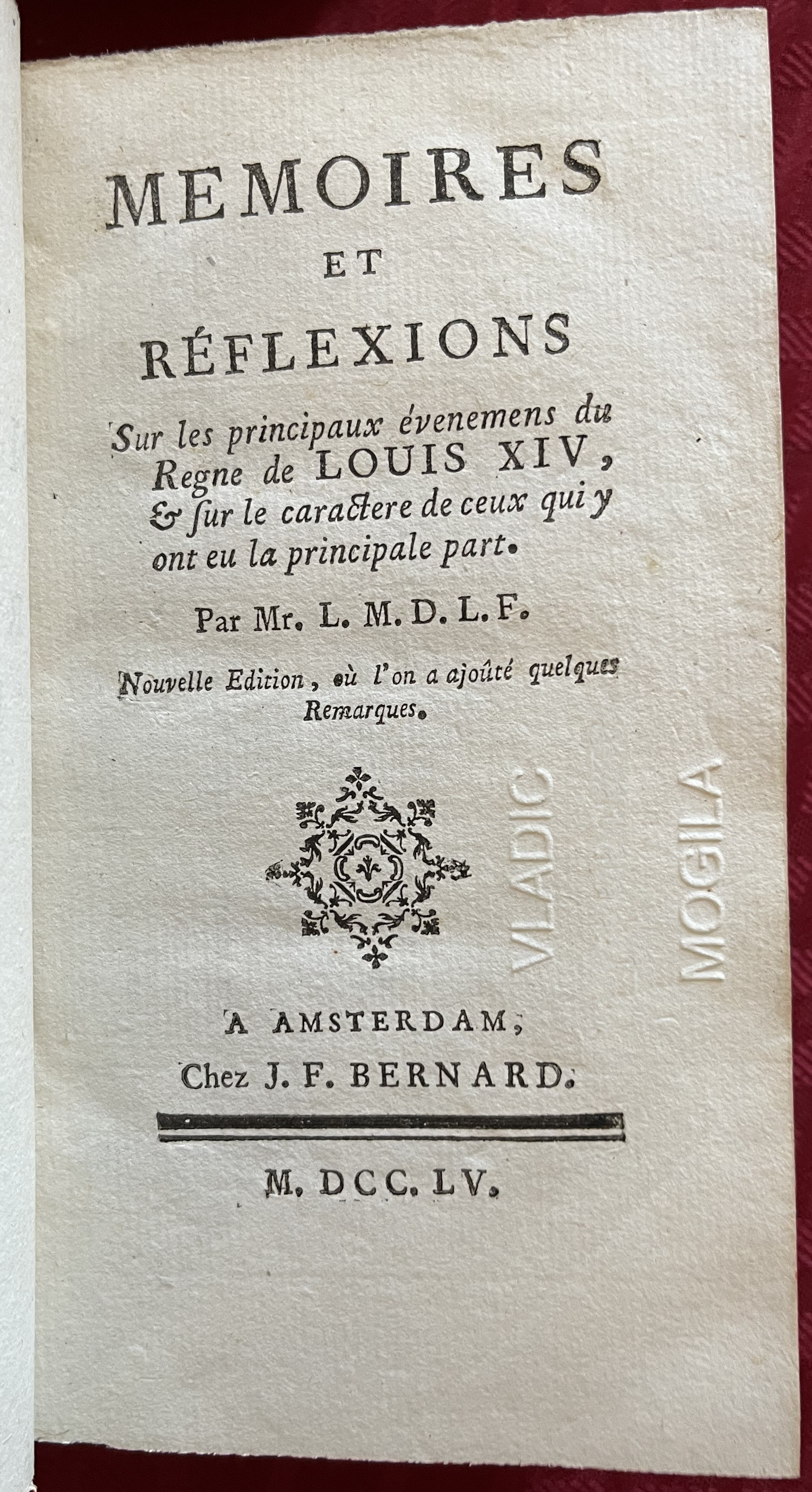
  Memoires et Réflexions Sur les principaux évenements du Regne de LOUIS XIV

== Marriage ==
On 3 November 1684, La Fare married Jeanne de Lux.

== Children ==
1. Philippe Charles de La Fare, 2nd Marquis of La Fare (1687–1752), Marshal of France
2. Étienne Joseph de La Fare, Bishop of Laon
3. Jacqueline-Thérèse de La Fare (1686–1688)
4. Marie de La Fare married Jean François de La Fare, Viscount of Montclar, cousin of her father.
