= Fours-en-Vexin =

- Part of Vexin-sur-Epte
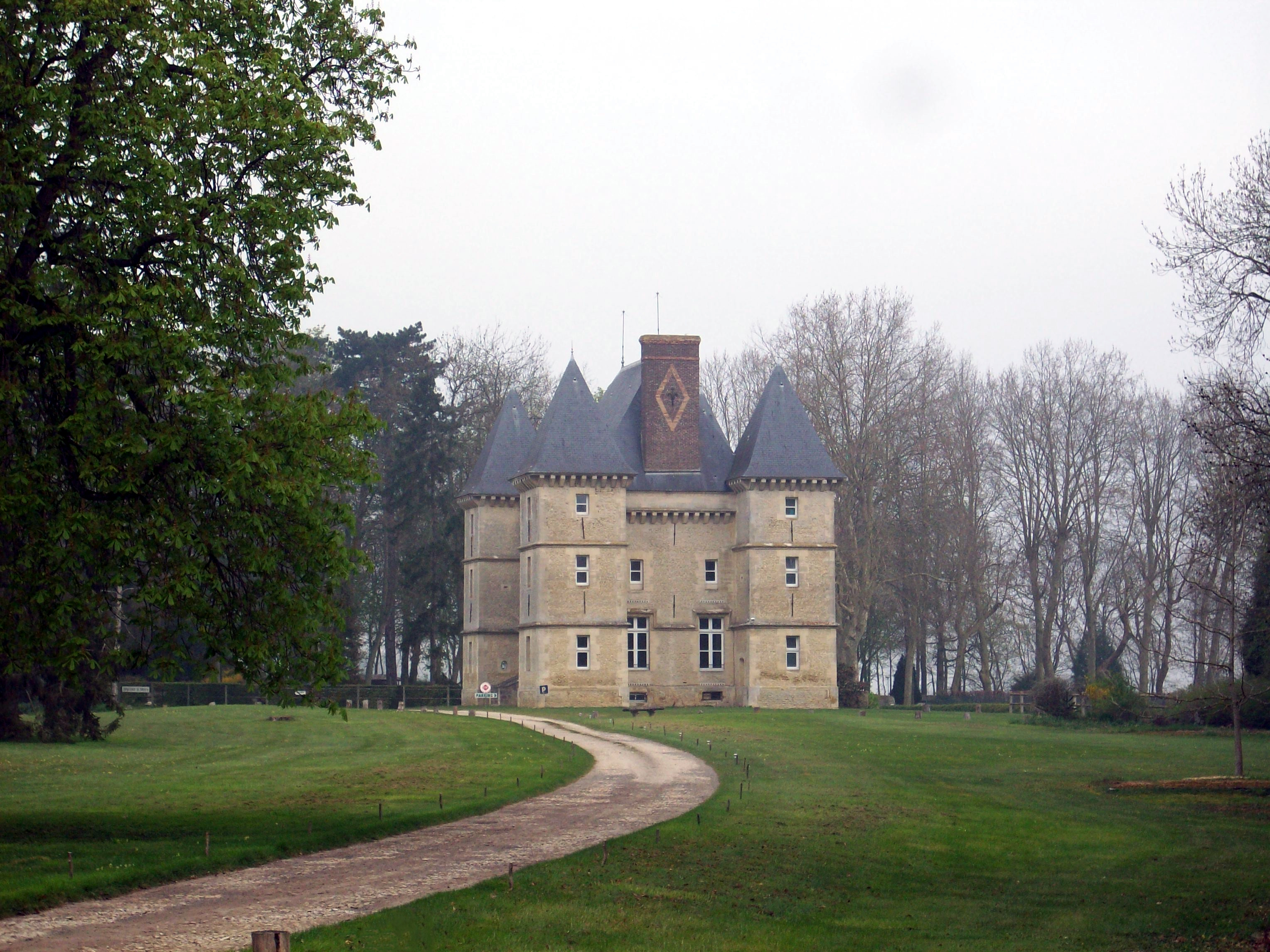
- Chateau
- Location of Fours-en-Vexin
- Location within France Location within Normandy
- Coordinates: 49°11′23″N 1°36′13″E
- Country: France
- Region: Normandy
- Department: Eure
- Arrondissement: Les Andelys
- Canton: Les Andelys
- Commune: Vexin-sur-Epte
- Area^{1}: 5.92 km^{2} (2.29 sq mi)
- Elevation: 99 m (325 ft)
- Highest elevation: 143 m (469 ft)
- Lowest elevation: 89 m (292 ft)
- Population (2019): 193
  - Density: 32.6/km^{2} (84.4/sq mi)
- Time zone: UTC+01:00 (CET)
  - Summer (DST): UTC+02:00 (CEST)
- Postal code: 27630
- ^{1} French Land Register data, which excludes lakes, ponds, glaciers > 1 km^{2} (0.386 sq mi or 247 acres) and river estuaries.

Fours-en-Vexin (French pronunciation: [fuʁ ɑ̃ vɛksɛ̃], literally Fours on Vexin) is a former commune in the Eure department in the Normandy region in northern France. On 1 January 2016, it was merged into the new commune of Vexin-sur-Epte.

== See also ==
- Communes of the Eure department
