= Marguerite de Launay, baronne de Staal =

French author and lady-in-waiting

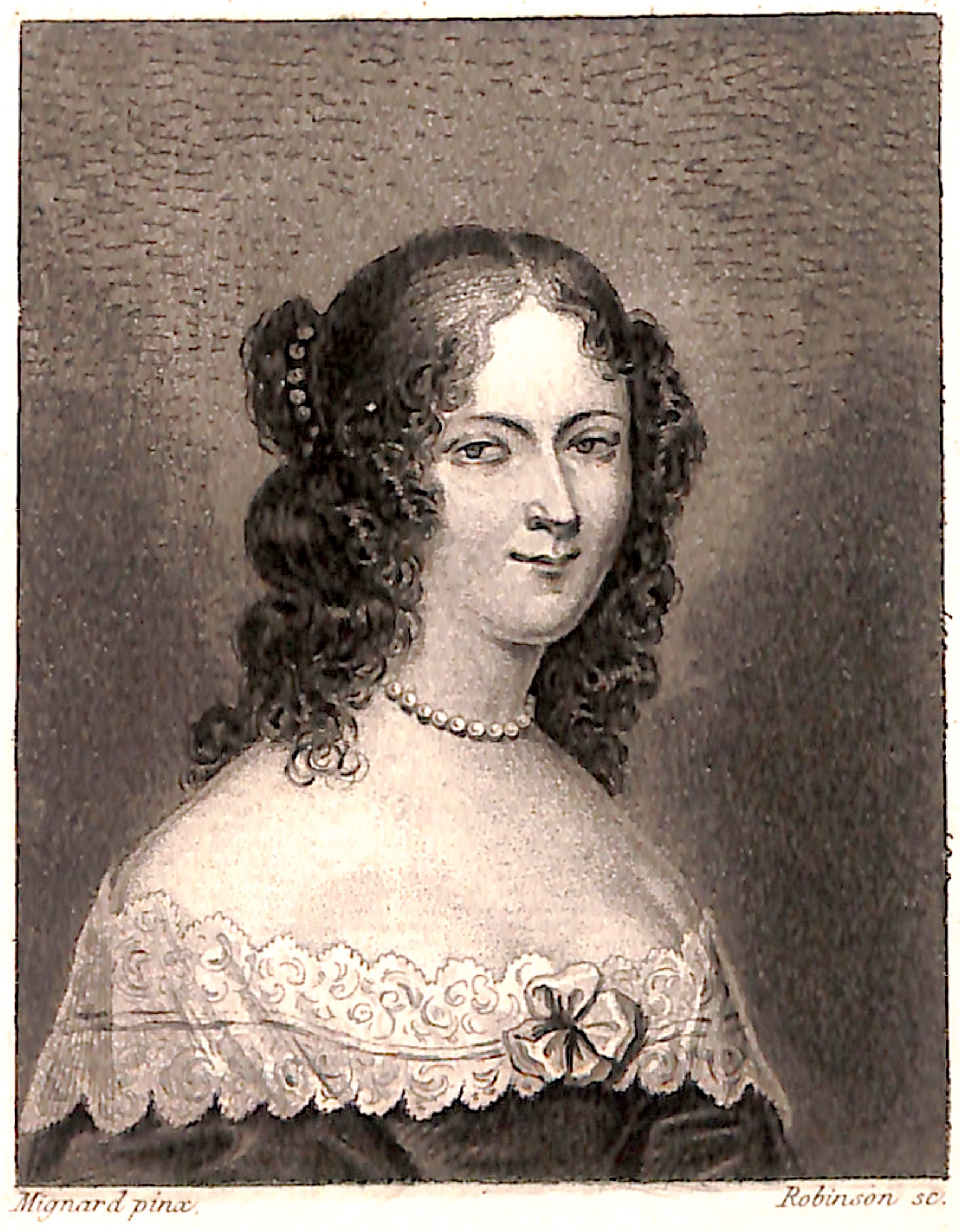
- Portrait of baroness de Staal, née De Launay (1870)
- Born: Marguerite Jeanne Cordier; 30 August 1684; Paris, France
- Died: 15 June 1750 (aged 65); Gennevilliers, Paris, France
- Education: convent at Evreux
- Occupations: lady-in-waiting; author
- Spouse: Baron de Staal
- Writing career
- Language: French
- Period: c. 1740
- Notable work: Mémoires

Marguerite Jeanne Cordier de Launay, baronne de Staal (30 August 1684 – 15 June 1750) was a French writer.

== Life ==
De Launay was born in Paris. Her father was a painter named Cordier. He seems to have deserted her mother, who then resumed her maiden name, de Launay, which was also adopted by her daughter. She was educated at a convent at Evreux, of which Mme de La Rochefoucauld, sister of François de La Rochefoucauld, author of the Maximes, was superior. There, she became attached to Mme de Grieu, who, being appointed abbess of the convent of St Louis at Rouen, took her friend with her.

Mlle de Launay lived there until 1710 in the enjoyment of the utmost consideration, and held a little court of her own, which included Brunel, the friend of Fontenelle, the sieur de la Rey and the abbé Vertot. She describes her own first passion for the marquis de Silly, the brother of a friend with whom she was visiting. Her affection was not returned, but she entered on a correspondence with him in which she plays the part of director.

After the death of her patron, Mme de Grieu, poverty compelled her to enter the household of the duchesse du Maine at the Château de Sceaux in the capacity of lady-in-waiting. Her literary talent soon manifested itself in the literary court of the duchesse, and secured for her, among other friendships, the somewhat undesirable admiration of the abbé Chaulieu. The duchesse is said, on the somewhat dubious authority of her lady-in-waiting, to have been not a little jealous of her attendant. Enough, however, is known of the duchesse's imperious and capricious temper to make it improbable that her service was agreeable. Mlle de Launay, however, enjoyed a large share of her mistress' confidence and had a considerable share in drawing up the Mémoire des princes légitimes which demanded the meeting of the states-general.

She was implicated in the Cellamare Conspiracy of Giulio Alberoni against Philippe II, Duke of Orléans, regent for Louis XV, and was sent in 1718 to the Bastille, where she remained for two years. Even here, however, she made conquests, though she was far from beautiful. Her own account of her love for her fellow prisoner, the chevalier de Ménil, and of the passion of the chevalier de Maisonrouge, her gaoler, for her, is justly famous. She returned on her liberation to the service of the duchess, who showed no gratitude for the devotion, approaching the heroic, that Mlle Delaunay had shown in her cause. She received no promotion and still had to fulfill the wearisome duties of a waiting-maid. She refused, it is said, André Dacier, the widower of a wife more famous than himself, and, in 1735, being then more than fifty, married the Baron de Staal. Her dissatisfaction with her position had become so evident that the duchess, afraid of losing her services, arranged the marriage to give Mlle Delaunay rank sufficient to allow of her promotion to be on an equality with the ladies of the court.

On this footing she remained a member of the household. It was at this time that she became the friend and correspondent of Mme du Deffand. She died at Gennevilliers.

== Works ==
Her Mémoires appeared about five years later, and have often been reprinted, both separately and in collections of the memoirs of the 17th and 18th centuries, to both of which the author belonged both in style and character. She has much of the frankness and seductive verve of Mme de Sévigné and her contemporaries, but more than a little alloyed with the sensibility of a later time. It may be doubted whether she does not somewhat exaggerate the discomforts of her position and her sense of them. In her lack of illusions, she was a child of the 18th century. Sainte-Beuve says that the most fit time for the reading of the Mémoires is the late autumn, under the trees of November, but her book is an extremely amusing one to read, as well as not a little instructive. The humours of the court of Sceaux are depicted as hardly any other society of the kind has ever been. "Dans cet art enjoué de raconter", says Sainte-Beuve, "Madame de Staal est classique".

Besides her Mémoires Mme de Staal left two excellent short comedies, performed at the court of Sceaux, and some letters, the answers to which are in some cases extant, and show, as well as the references of contemporaries, that the writer did not exaggerate her own charm. Her Mémoires were translated by Selina Bathurst (1877) and by Cora H. Bell (1892). See the edition (1877) of her Mémoires by M. de Lescure.
