= Guillaume Amfrye de Chaulieu =

French poet (c. 1639 – 1720)

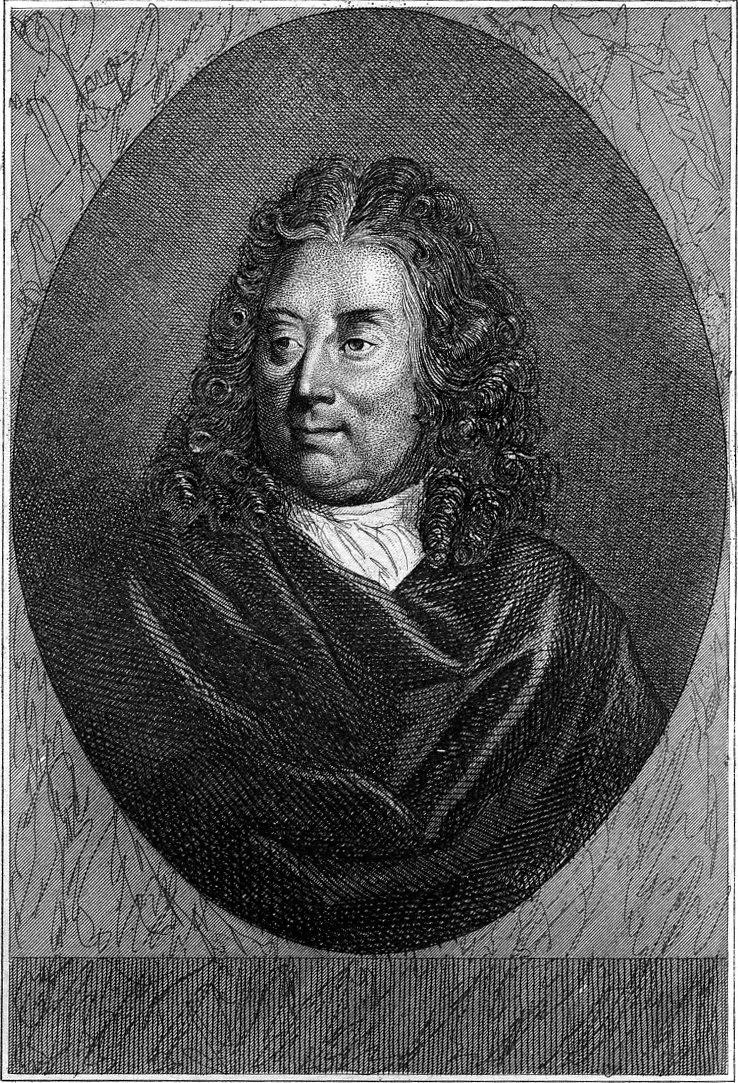
- Engraving by Charles Devrits
- Born: ca. 1639; Fontenay-en-Vexin
- Died: 27 June 1720; Paris
- Citizenship: France
- Occupation: Poet
- Writing career
- Language: French

Guillaume Amfrye de Chaulieu (1639 – 27 June 1720), French poet and wit, was born at Fontenay, Province of Normandy.

His father, maître des Comptes of Rouen, sent him to study at the Collège de Navarre. Guillaume early showed the wit that was to distinguish him, and gained the favor of the duke of Vendôme, who procured for him the monastery of Aumale and other benefices. Louis Joseph, Duc de Vendôme, and his brother Philippe, grand prior of the Knights of Malta in France, at that time had a joint establishment at the Temple, where they gathered around them a very gay and reckless course.

Chaulieu became the constant companion and adviser of the two princes. He made an alacrity to Poland in the suite of the marquis de Béthune, hoping to make a career for himself in the court of John Sobieski; he saw one of the Polish king's campaigns in Ukraine, but returned to Paris without securing any advancement. Saint-Simon says that the abbé helped his patron the grand prior to rob the duke of Vendôme and that the king sent orders that the princes should take the management of their affairs from him. This account has been questioned by Sainte-Beuve, who regards Saint-Simon as a prejudiced witness.

In his later years Chaulieu spent much time at the little court of the duchesse du Maine at Sceaux. There he became the trusted and devoted friend of Mlle Delaunay, with whom he carried on an interesting correspondence. Among his poems the best known are Fontenay and La Retraite.

His works were edited with those of his friend the Marquis de La Fare in 1714, 1750 and 1774. See also CA Sainte-Beuve, Causeries du lundi, vol. i.; and Lettres inédites (1850), with a notice by Raymond, marquis de Bérenger.
