= Berthenonville =

- Part of Vexin-sur-Epte
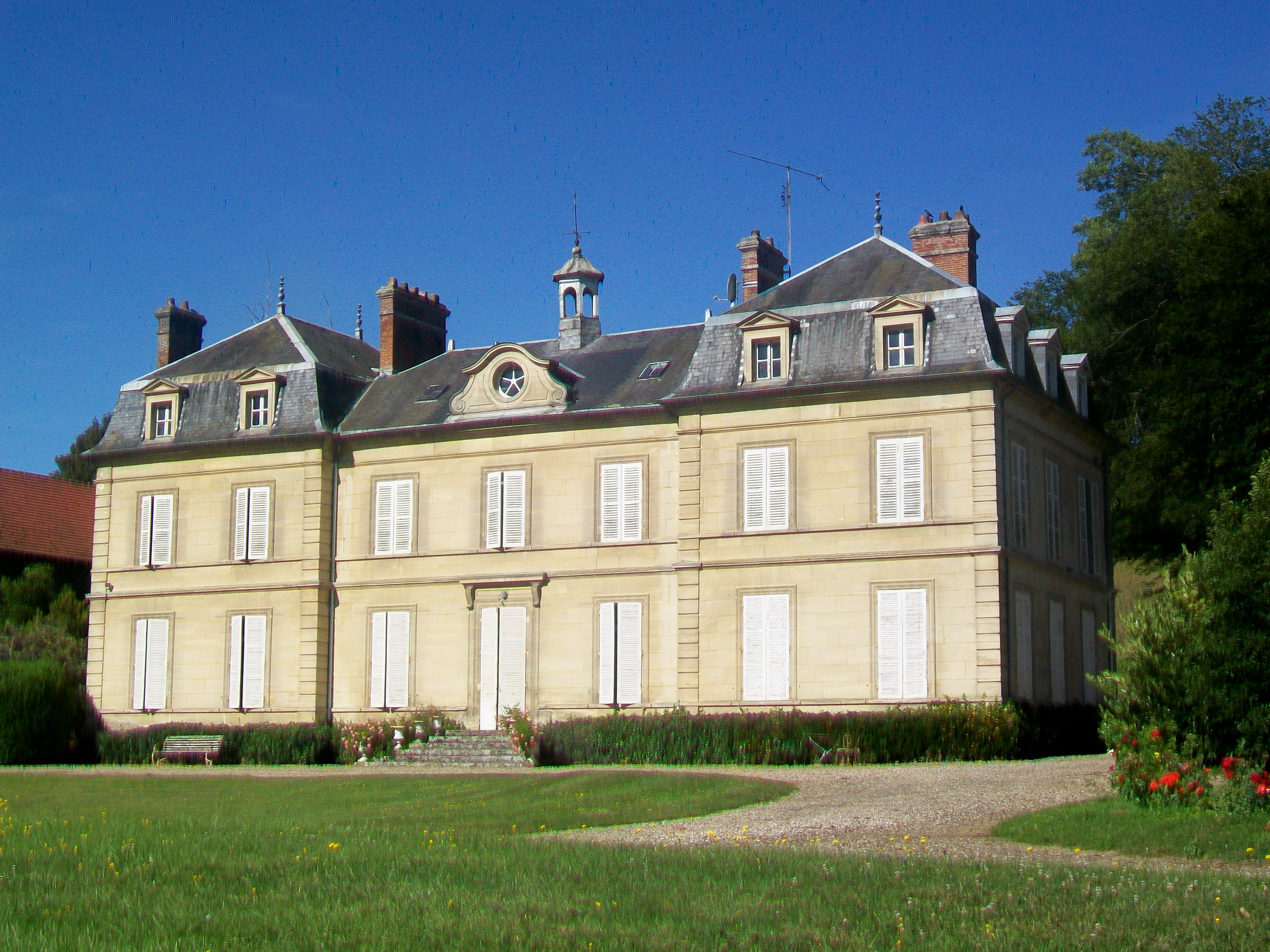
- Chateau

- Coat of arms
- Location of Berthenonville
- Location within France Location within Normandy
- Coordinates: 49°11′02″N 1°39′44″E
- Country: France
- Region: Normandy
- Department: Eure
- Arrondissement: Les Andelys
- Canton: Les Andelys
- Commune: Vexin-sur-Epte
- Area^{1}: 5.92 km^{2} (2.29 sq mi)
- Elevation: 34 m (112 ft)
- Highest elevation: 144 m (472 ft)
- Lowest elevation: 27 m (89 ft)
- Population (2023): 252
  - Density: 42.6/km^{2} (110/sq mi)
- Time zone: UTC+01:00 (CET)
  - Summer (DST): UTC+02:00 (CEST)
- Postal code: 27630
- ^{1} French Land Register data, which excludes lakes, ponds, glaciers > 1 km^{2} (0.386 sq mi or 247 acres) and river estuaries.

Berthenonville (French pronunciation: [bɛʁtənɔ̃vil]) is a former commune in the Eure department in Normandy in northern France. On 1 January 2016, it was merged into the new commune of Vexin-sur-Epte.

== See also ==
- Communes of the Eure department
