= Cantiers =

- Part of Vexin-sur-Epte
- Location of Cantiers
- Location within France Location within Normandy
- Coordinates: 49°14′07″N 1°35′10″E
- Country: France
- Region: Normandy
- Department: Eure
- Arrondissement: Les Andelys
- Canton: Les Andelys
- Commune: Vexin-sur-Epte
- Area^{1}: 2.28 km^{2} (0.88 sq mi)
- Elevation: 125 m (410 ft)
- Highest elevation: 132 m (433 ft)
- Lowest elevation: 95 m (312 ft)
- Population (2023): 232
  - Density: 102/km^{2} (264/sq mi)
- Time zone: UTC+01:00 (CET)
  - Summer (DST): UTC+02:00 (CEST)
- Postal code: 27420
- ^{1} French Land Register data, which excludes lakes, ponds, glaciers > 1 km^{2} (0.386 sq mi or 247 acres) and river estuaries.

Cantiers (French pronunciation: [kɑ̃tje]) is a former commune in the Eure department in northern France. On 1 January 2016, it was merged into the new commune of Vexin-sur-Epte.

== See also ==
- Communes of the Eure department
