= Vexin-sur-Epte =

Commune in Eure, France, formed in 2016

- Commune
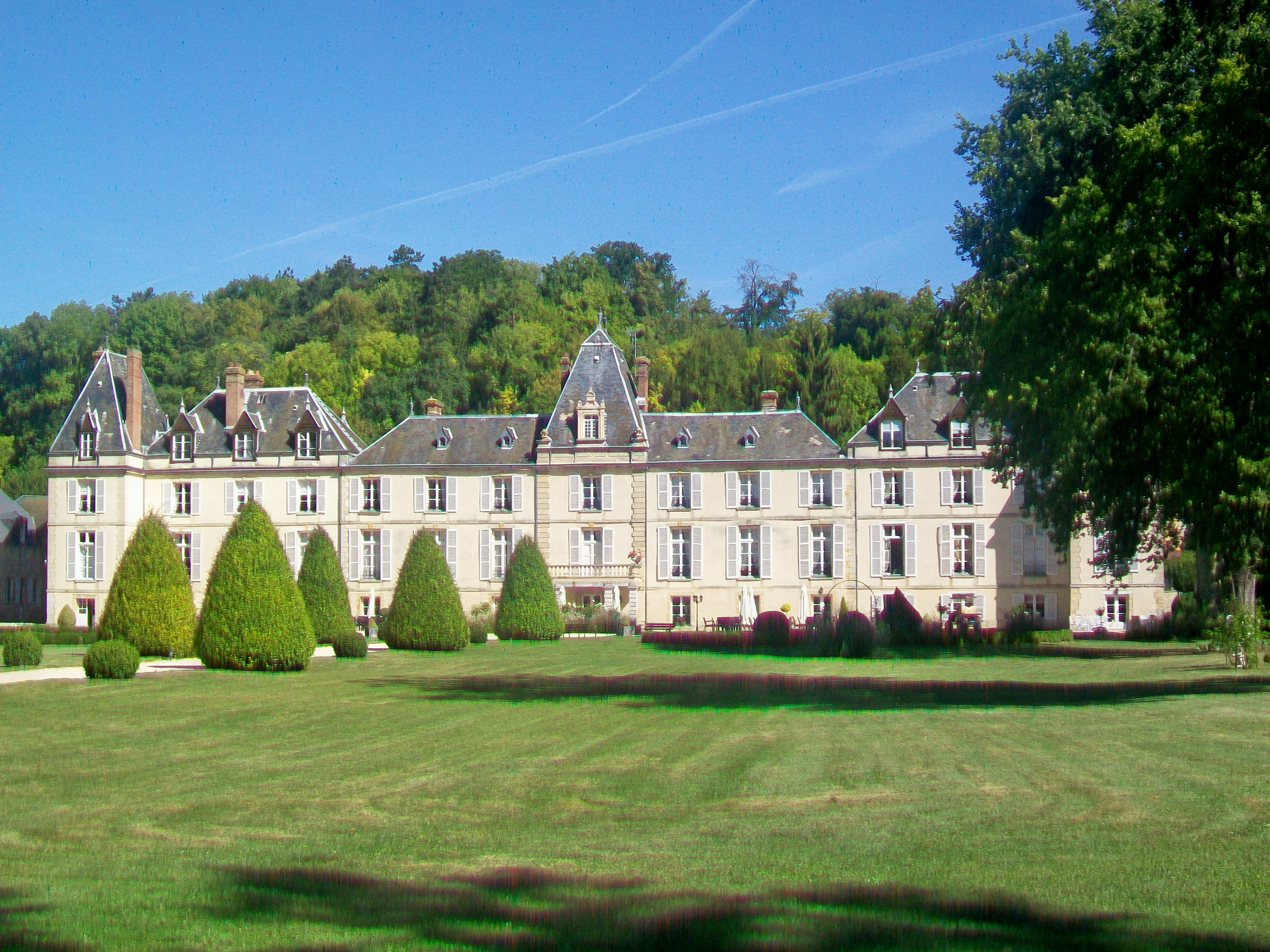
- The château of Aveny in Dampsmesnil
- Location of Vexin-sur-Epte
- Location within France Location within Normandy
- Coordinates: 49°09′32″N 1°36′14″E
- Country: France
- Region: Normandy
- Department: Eure
- Arrondissement: Les Andelys
- Canton: Les Andelys
- Intercommunality: Seine Normandie Agglomération

Government
  - Mayor (2020–2026): Thomas Durand
- Area^{1}: 114.49 km^{2} (44.20 sq mi)
- Population (2023): 6,015
  - Density: 52.54/km^{2} (136.1/sq mi)
- Time zone: UTC+01:00 (CET)
  - Summer (DST): UTC+02:00 (CEST)
- INSEE/Postal code: 27213 /27630, 27420, 27510
- ^{1} French Land Register data, which excludes lakes, ponds, glaciers > 1 km^{2} (0.386 sq mi or 247 acres) and river estuaries.

Vexin-sur-Epte (French pronunciation: [vɛksɛ̃ syʁ ɛpt], literally Vexin on Epte) is a commune in the department of Eure, northern France. The municipality was established on 1 January 2016 by merger of the former communes of Écos (the seat), Berthenonville, Bus-Saint-Rémy, Cahaignes, Cantiers, Civières, Dampsmesnil, Fontenay-en-Vexin, Forêt-la-Folie, Fourges, Fours-en-Vexin, Guitry, Panilleuse and Tourny.

== Population ==
Population data refer to the commune in its geography as of January 2025.

Historical population
Year	Pop.	±% p.a.
1968	3,300	—
1975	3,538	+1.00%
1982	4,114	+2.18%
1990	4,882	+2.16%
1999	5,457	+1.24%
2007	5,778	+0.72%
2012	6,051	+0.93%
2017	6,065	+0.05%
2023	6,015	−0.14%
Source: INSEE

== See also ==
- Communes of the Eure department
