= Civières =

- Part of Vexin-sur-Epte
- Coat of arms
- Location of Civières
- Location within France Location within Normandy
- Coordinates: 49°10′18″N 1°35′23″E
- Country: France
- Region: Normandy
- Department: Eure
- Arrondissement: Les Andelys
- Canton: Les Andelys
- Commune: Vexin-sur-Epte
- Area^{1}: 7.77 km^{2} (3.00 sq mi)
- Elevation: 113 m (371 ft)
- Highest elevation: 150 m (490 ft)
- Lowest elevation: 82 m (269 ft)
- Population (2019): 218
  - Density: 28.1/km^{2} (72.7/sq mi)
- Time zone: UTC+01:00 (CET)
  - Summer (DST): UTC+02:00 (CEST)
- Postal code: 27630
- ^{1} French Land Register data, which excludes lakes, ponds, glaciers > 1 km^{2} (0.386 sq mi or 247 acres) and river estuaries.

Civières (French pronunciation: [sivjɛʁ]) is a former commune in the Eure department in northern France. On 1 January 2016, it was merged into the new commune of Vexin-sur-Epte.

== See also ==
- Communes of the Eure department
