= Forêt-la-Folie =

- Part of Vexin-sur-Epte
- Location of Forêt-la-Folie
- Location within France Location within Normandy
- Coordinates: 49°13′26″N 1°31′47″E
- Country: France
- Region: Normandy
- Department: Eure
- Arrondissement: Les Andelys
- Canton: Les Andelys
- Commune: Vexin-sur-Epte
- Area^{1}: 11.02 km^{2} (4.25 sq mi)
- Elevation: 116 m (381 ft)
- Highest elevation: 146 m (479 ft)
- Lowest elevation: 72 m (236 ft)
- Population (2023): 442
  - Density: 40.1/km^{2} (104/sq mi)
- Time zone: UTC+01:00 (CET)
  - Summer (DST): UTC+02:00 (CEST)
- Postal code: 27510
- ^{1} French Land Register data, which excludes lakes, ponds, glaciers > 1 km^{2} (0.386 sq mi or 247 acres) and river estuaries.

Forêt-la-Folie (French pronunciation: [fɔʁɛ la fɔli]) is a former commune in the Eure department in the Normandy region in northern France. On 1 January 2016, it was merged into the new commune of Vexin-sur-Epte.

== See also ==
- Communes of the Eure department
