= Tourny =

- Part of Vexin-sur-Epte
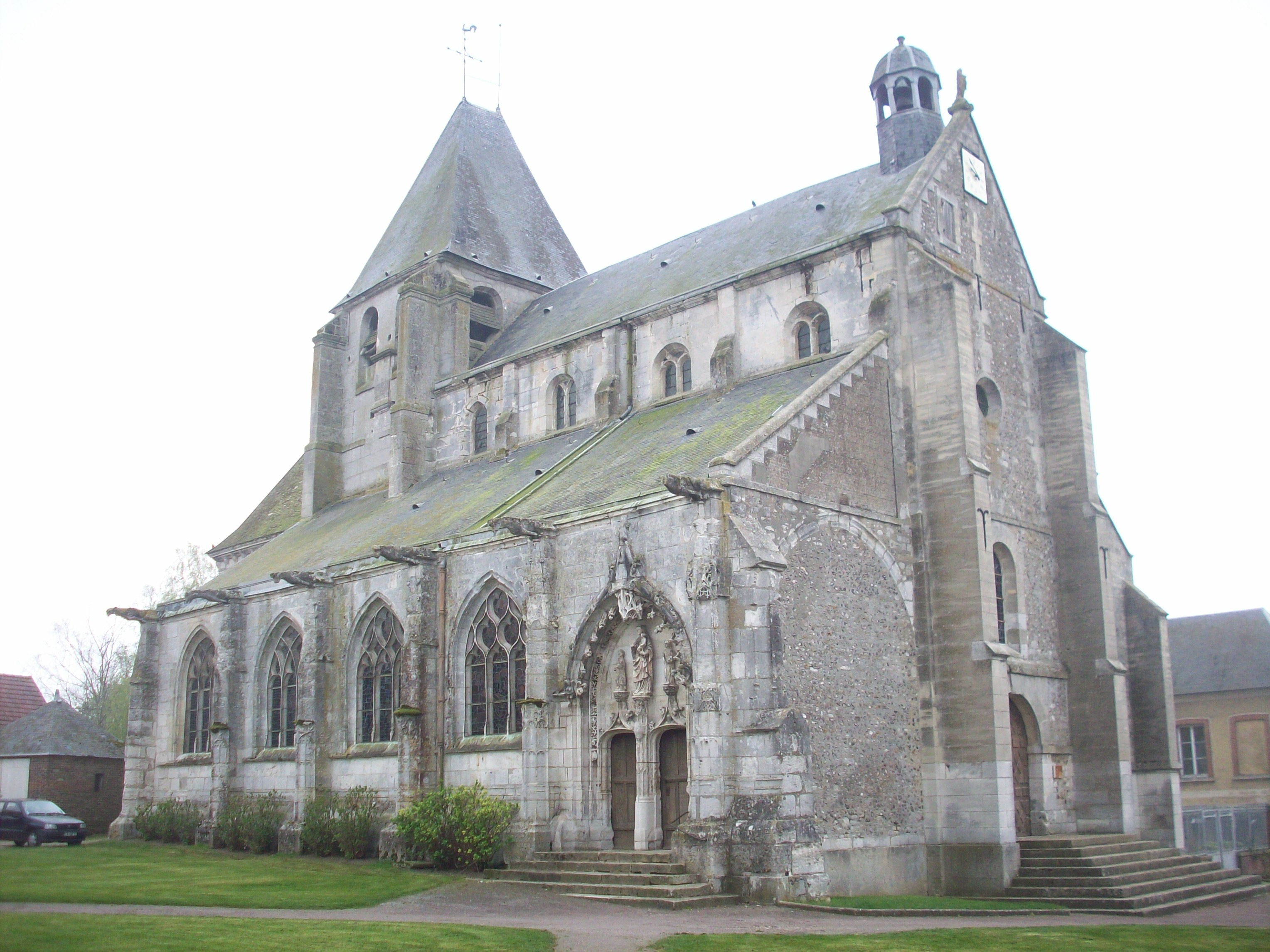

- Coat of arms
- Location of Tourny
- Location within France Location within Normandy
- Coordinates: 49°11′06″N 1°32′48″E
- Country: France
- Region: Normandy
- Department: Eure
- Arrondissement: Les Andelys
- Canton: Les Andelys
- Commune: Vexin-sur-Epte
- Area^{1}: 11.95 km^{2} (4.61 sq mi)
- Highest elevation: 159 m (522 ft)
- Lowest elevation: 106 m (348 ft)
- Population (2023): 902
  - Density: 75.5/km^{2} (195/sq mi)
- Time zone: UTC+01:00 (CET)
  - Summer (DST): UTC+02:00 (CEST)
- Postal code: 27510
- ^{1} French Land Register data, which excludes lakes, ponds, glaciers > 1 km^{2} (0.386 sq mi or 247 acres) and river estuaries.

Tourny (French pronunciation: [tuʁni]) is a former commune in the Eure department in Normandy in northern France. On 1 January 2016, it was merged into the new commune of Vexin-sur-Epte.

== See also ==
- Communes of the Eure department
