= Cahaignes =

- Part of Vexin-sur-Epte
- Coat of arms
- Location of Cahaignes
- Location within France Location within Normandy
- Coordinates: 49°12′33″N 1°36′03″E
- Country: France
- Region: Normandy
- Department: Eure
- Arrondissement: Les Andelys
- Canton: Les Andelys
- Commune: Vexin-sur-Epte
- Area^{1}: 9.54 km^{2} (3.68 sq mi)
- Elevation: 111 m (364 ft)
- Highest elevation: 141 m (463 ft)
- Lowest elevation: 87 m (285 ft)
- Population (2019): 344
  - Density: 36.1/km^{2} (93.4/sq mi)
- Time zone: UTC+01:00 (CET)
  - Summer (DST): UTC+02:00 (CEST)
- Postal code: 27420
- ^{1} French Land Register data, which excludes lakes, ponds, glaciers > 1 km^{2} (0.386 sq mi or 247 acres) and river estuaries.

Cahaignes (French pronunciation: [ka.ɛɲ]) is a former commune in the Eure department in Normandy in northern France. On 1 January 2016, it was merged into the new commune of Vexin-sur-Epte.

== See also ==
- Communes of the Eure department
- Fourges, a close municipality in the same department
