= Panilleuse =

- Part of Vexin-sur-Epte
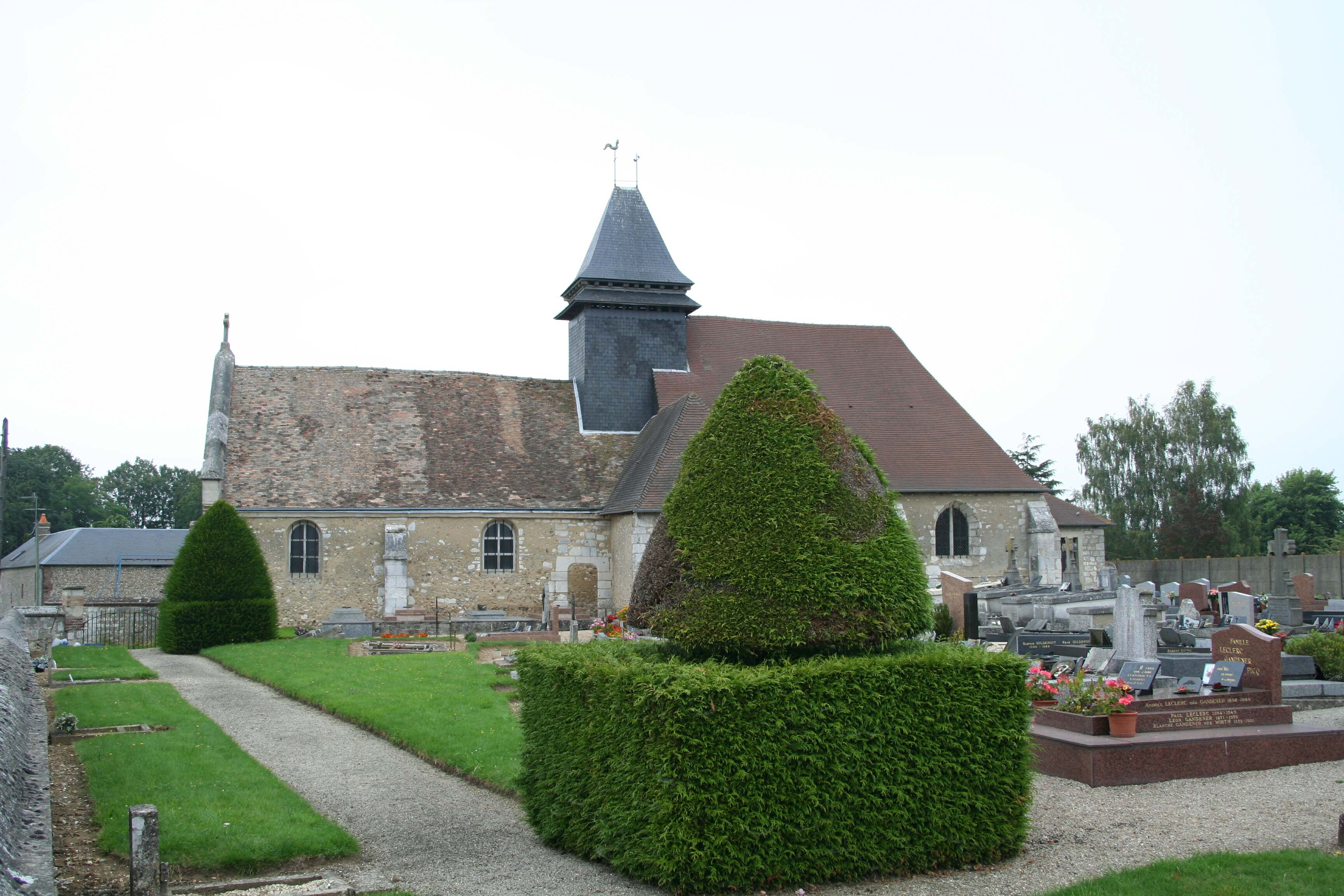
- Location of Panilleuse
- Location within France Location within Normandy
- Coordinates: 49°09′04″N 1°30′11″E
- Country: France
- Region: Normandy
- Department: Eure
- Arrondissement: Les Andelys
- Canton: Les Andelys
- Commune: Vexin-sur-Epte
- Area^{1}: 8.87 km^{2} (3.42 sq mi)
- Elevation: 149 m (489 ft)
- Highest elevation: 159 m (522 ft)
- Lowest elevation: 85 m (279 ft)
- Population (2023): 465
  - Density: 52.4/km^{2} (136/sq mi)
- Time zone: UTC+01:00 (CET)
  - Summer (DST): UTC+02:00 (CEST)
- Postal code: 27510
- ^{1} French Land Register data, which excludes lakes, ponds, glaciers > 1 km^{2} (0.386 sq mi or 247 acres) and river estuaries.

Panilleuse (French pronunciation: [panijøz]) is a former commune in the Eure department in Normandy in northern France. On 1 January 2016, it was merged into the new commune of Vexin-sur-Epte.

== See also ==
- Communes of the Eure department
