= Fourges =

- Part of Vexin-sur-Epte
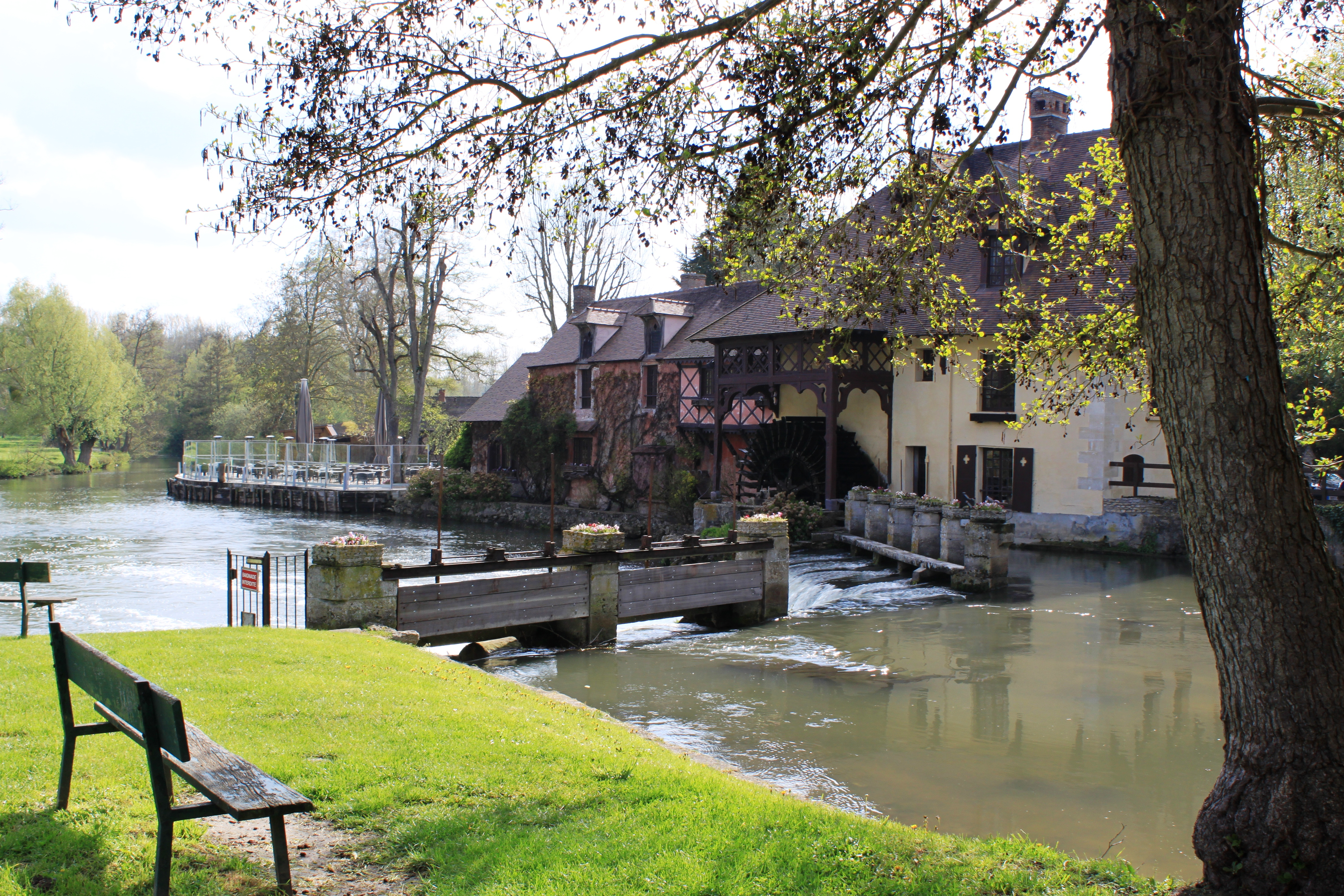
- Mill
- Location of Fourges
- Location within France Location within Normandy
- Coordinates: 49°07′19″N 1°38′28″E
- Country: France
- Region: Normandy
- Department: Eure
- Arrondissement: Les Andelys
- Canton: Les Andelys
- Commune: Vexin-sur-Epte
- Area^{1}: 7.72 km^{2} (2.98 sq mi)
- Elevation: 33 m (108 ft)
- Highest elevation: 142 m (466 ft)
- Lowest elevation: 20 m (66 ft)
- Population (2023): 805
  - Density: 104/km^{2} (270/sq mi)
- Time zone: UTC+01:00 (CET)
  - Summer (DST): UTC+02:00 (CEST)
- Postal code: 27630
- ^{1} French Land Register data, which excludes lakes, ponds, glaciers > 1 km^{2} (0.386 sq mi or 247 acres) and river estuaries.

Fourges (French pronunciation: [fuʁʒ]) is a former commune in the Eure department in the Normandy region in northern France. On 1 January 2016, it was merged into the new commune of Vexin-sur-Epte.

== See also ==
- Communes of the Eure department
- Cahaignes, a close municipality in the same department
