= Fontenay-en-Vexin =

- Part of Vexin-sur-Epte
- Location of Fontenay-en-Vexin
- Location within France Location within Normandy
- Coordinates: 49°12′35″N 1°34′14″E
- Country: France
- Region: Normandy
- Department: Eure
- Arrondissement: Les Andelys
- Canton: Les Andelys
- Commune: Vexin-sur-Epte
- Area^{1}: 6.76 km^{2} (2.61 sq mi)
- Elevation: 105 m (344 ft)
- Highest elevation: 146 m (479 ft)
- Lowest elevation: 94 m (308 ft)
- Population (2023): 234
  - Density: 34.6/km^{2} (89.7/sq mi)
- Time zone: UTC+01:00 (CET)
  - Summer (DST): UTC+02:00 (CEST)
- Postal code: 27510
- ^{1} French Land Register data, which excludes lakes, ponds, glaciers > 1 km^{2} (0.386 sq mi or 247 acres) and river estuaries.

Fontenay-en-Vexin (French pronunciation: [fɔ̃tnɛ ɑ̃ vɛksɛ̃], literally Fontenay in Vexin; before 2015: Fontenay) is a former commune in the Eure department in the Normandy region in northern France. On 1 January 2016, it was merged into the new commune of Vexin-sur-Epte.

== See also ==
- Communes of the Eure department
