= Écos =

- Part of Vexin-sur-Epte
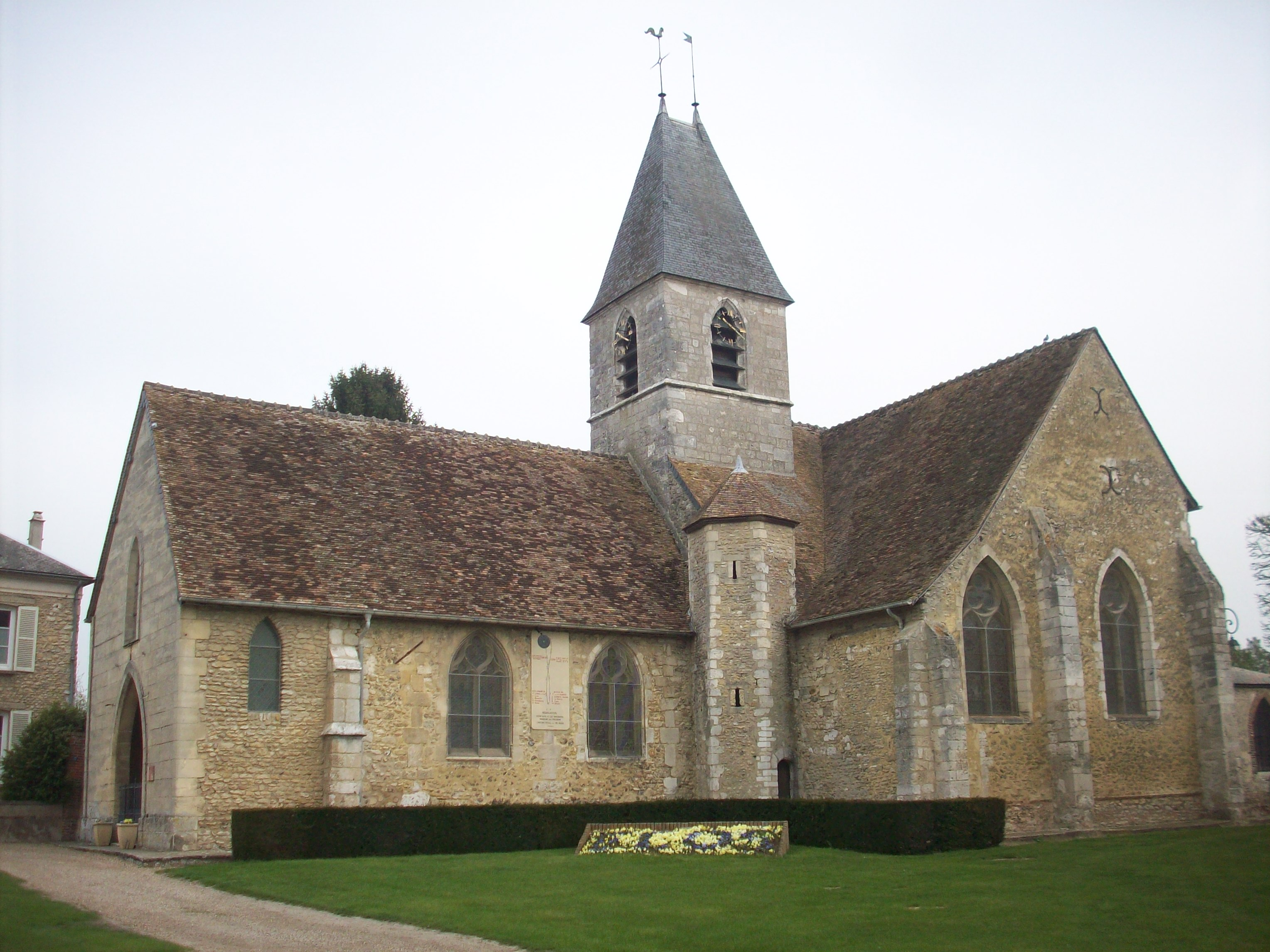

- Coat of arms
- Location of Écos
- Location within France Location within Normandy
- Coordinates: 49°09′35″N 1°36′22″E
- Country: France
- Region: Normandy
- Department: Eure
- Arrondissement: Les Andelys
- Canton: Les Andelys
- Commune: Vexin-sur-Epte
- Area^{1}: 15.23 km^{2} (5.88 sq mi)
- Elevation: 80 m (260 ft)
- Highest elevation: 153 m (502 ft)
- Lowest elevation: 40 m (130 ft)
- Population (2022): 1,079
  - Density: 70.85/km^{2} (183.5/sq mi)
- Time zone: UTC+01:00 (CET)
  - Summer (DST): UTC+02:00 (CEST)
- Postal code: 27630
- ^{1} French Land Register data, which excludes lakes, ponds, glaciers > 1 km^{2} (0.386 sq mi or 247 acres) and river estuaries.

Écos (French pronunciation: [eko]) is a former commune in the Eure department in northern France. On 1 January 2016, it was merged into the new commune of Vexin-sur-Epte.

== Population ==
Historical population
Year	Pop.	±% p.a.
1962	446	—
1968	411	−1.35%
1975	418	+0.24%
1982	705	+7.75%
1990	805	+1.67%
1999	887	+1.08%
2006	888	+0.02%
2022	1,079	+1.23%
Source: EHESS and INSEE

== See also ==
- Communes of the Eure department
