= Guitry =

- Part of Vexin-sur-Epte
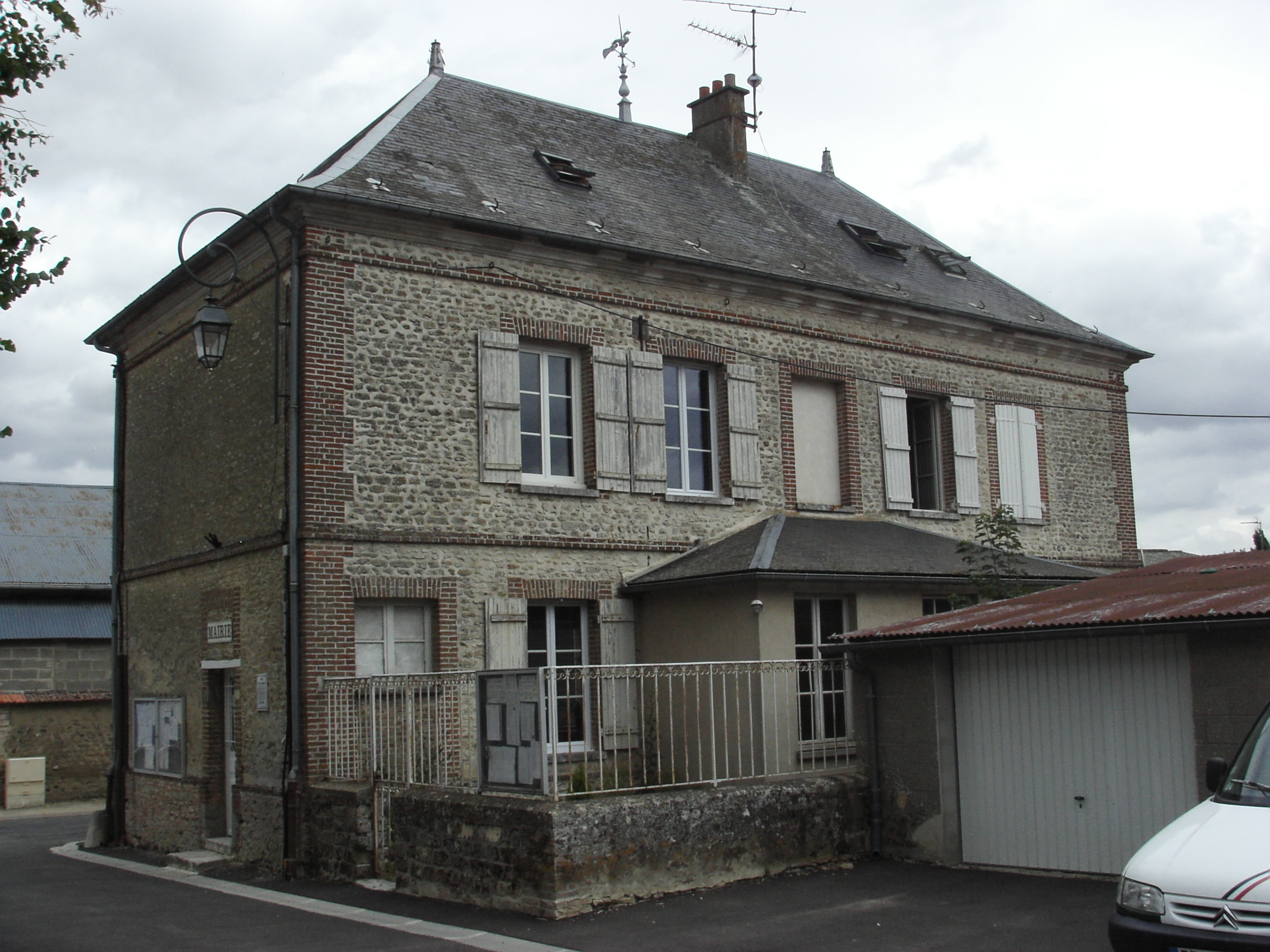
- Guitry Town hall
- Location of Guitry
- Location within France Location within Normandy
- Coordinates: 49°13′01″N 1°32′56″E
- Country: France
- Region: Normandy
- Department: Eure
- Arrondissement: Les Andelys
- Canton: Les Andelys
- Commune: Vexin-sur-Epte
- Area^{1}: 8.13 km^{2} (3.14 sq mi)
- Elevation: 148 m (486 ft)
- Highest elevation: 143 m (469 ft)
- Lowest elevation: 75 m (246 ft)
- Population (2023): 258
  - Density: 31.7/km^{2} (82.2/sq mi)
- Time zone: UTC+01:00 (CET)
  - Summer (DST): UTC+02:00 (CEST)
- Postal code: 27510
- ^{1} French Land Register data, which excludes lakes, ponds, glaciers > 1 km^{2} (0.386 sq mi or 247 acres) and river estuaries.

Guitry (French pronunciation: [ɡitʁi]) is a former commune in the Eure department in northern France. On 1 January 2016, it was merged into the new commune of Vexin-sur-Epte.

== See also ==
- Communes of the Eure department
