= Guitry (name) =

Guitry is a name. It can be a masculine given name or a surname. Notable people with this name include:

== As a given name ==
- Guitry Bananier (born 1951), a French boxer

== As a surname ==
- Lana Marconi (1917 – 1990), a Romanian-French actress sometimes credited as "Lana Guitry"
- Lucien Guitry (1860 – 1925), a French actor
- Sacha Guitry (1885 – 1957), a French actor, director, and playwright
