= Régiment du Roi =

The name Régiment du Roi (Regiment of the King/King's Regiment) was used by several Royal French Army regiments throughout the period of the Kingdom of France:

Infantry

- Régiment du Roi (1st formation) – formed on 2 January 1663, renamed as 105th Line Infantry Regiment following the Revolution in 1791
- Régiment du Roi (2nd formation) – formed in 1814 by redesignation of the 1st Line Infantry Regiment, later reverted to 105th Line following Napoleon's return on 23 March 1815
- Régiment Léger du Roi – formed in 1814 by redesignation of the 1st Light Infantry Regiment, later reverted to 1st Lights following Napoleon's return on 23 March 1815

Cavalry

- Régiment du Roi Cavalerie – formed 1635, renamed as 6th Cavalry Regiment following the Revolution in 1791
- Régiment de Cuirassiers du Roi – formed in 1814 by redesignation of the 1st Cuirassier Regiment, later reverted to 1st Cuirassiers following Napoleon's return on 23 March 1815
- Régiment de Dragons du Roi – formed in 1814 by redesignation of the 1st Dragoon Regiment, later reverted to 1st Dragoons following Napoleon's return on 23 March 1815
- Régiment de Lanciers du Roi – formed in 1814 by redesignation of the 1st Light Cavalry Lancers Regiment, later reverted to 1st Lancers following Napoleon's return on 23 March 1815
- Régiment de Hussards du Roi – formed in 1814 by redesignation of the 1st Hussar Regiment, later reverted to 1st Hussars following Napoleon's return on 23 March 1815
- Régiment de Chasseurs à Cheval – formed in 1814 by redesignation of the 1st Chasseurs à Cheval Regiment, later reverted to 1st Chasseurs following Napoleon's return on 23 March 1815
