= Laon =

Prefecture and commune in Hauts-de-France, France

- Prefecture and commune
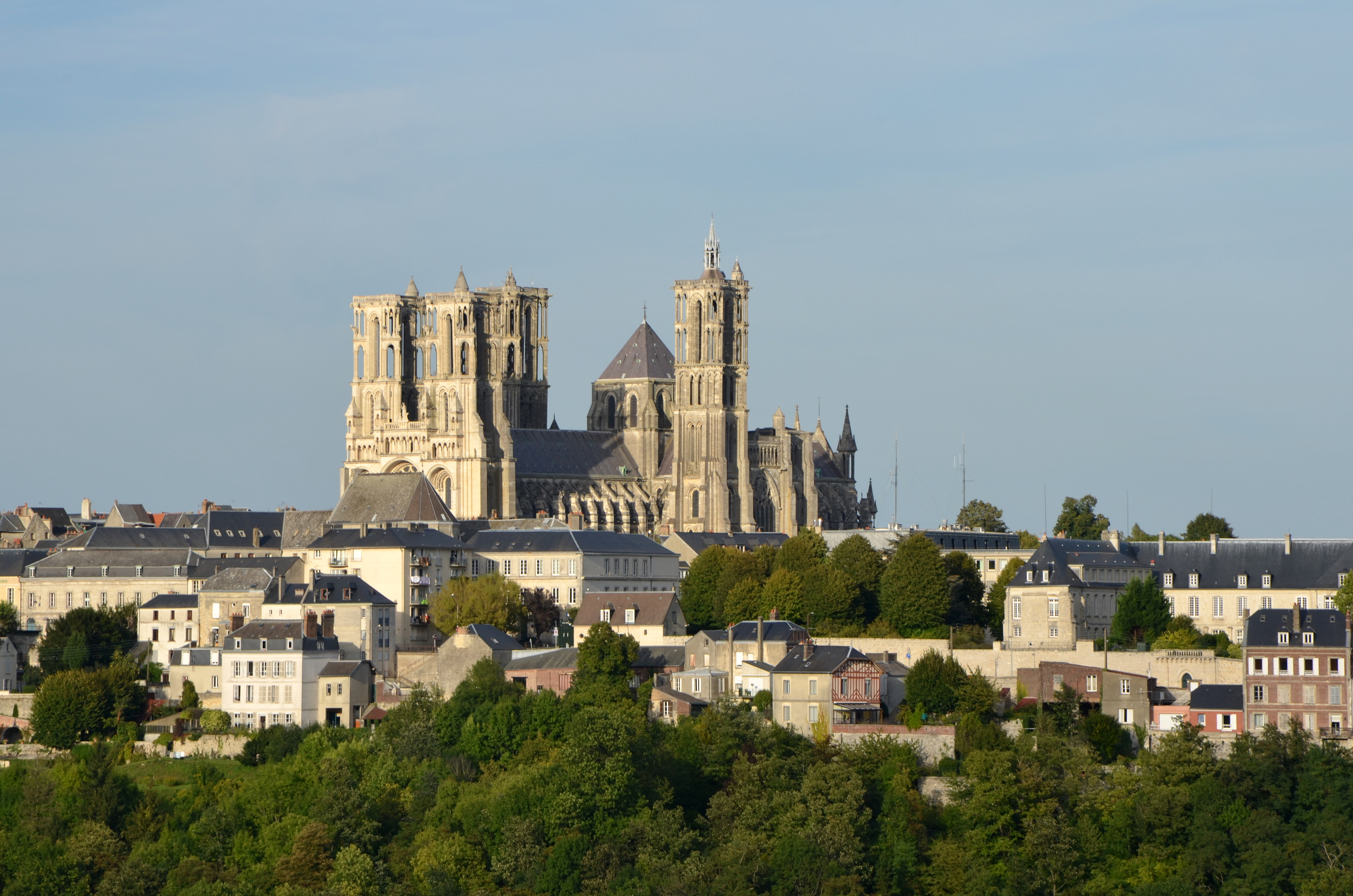
- Laon and its cathedral from the southwest

- Coat of arms
- Location of Laon
- Location within France Location within Hauts-de-France
- Coordinates: 49°33′52″N 3°37′14″E
- Country: France
- Region: Hauts-de-France
- Department: Aisne
- Arrondissement: Laon
- Canton: Laon-1, Laon-2
- Intercommunality: CA Pays de Laon

Government
  - Mayor (2026–32): Éric Delhaye
- Area^{1}: 42 km^{2} (16 sq mi)
- Elevation: 83 m (272 ft)
- Highest elevation: 183 m (600 ft)
- Lowest elevation: 63 m (207 ft)
- Population (2023): 24,220
  - Density: 580/km^{2} (1,500/sq mi)
- Time zone: UTC+01:00 (CET)
  - Summer (DST): UTC+02:00 (CEST)
- INSEE/Postal code: 02408 /02000
- Website: Official website
- ^{1} French Land Register data, which excludes lakes, ponds, glaciers > 1 km^{2} (0.386 sq mi or 247 acres) and river estuaries.

Laon (French: [lɑ̃]) is a city in the Aisne department in Hauts-de-France in northern France. It is the prefecture of the Aisne department, known for the gothic Laon Cathedral.

== History ==
=== Early history ===
The upper town of Laon, which rises a hundred metres above the otherwise flat Picardy plain, has always held strategic importance. In the time of Julius Caesar there was a Gallic village named Bibrax where the Remis (inhabitants of the country round Reims) had to meet the onset of the confederated Belgae. Whatever may have been the precise locality of that battlefield, Laon was fortified by the Romans, and successively checked the invasions of the Franks, Burgundians, Vandals, Alans and Huns. At that time it was known as Alaudanum or Lugdunum Clavatum.

Archbishop Remigius of Reims, who baptised Clovis, was born in the Laonnais, and it was he who, at the end of the fifth century, instituted the bishopric of Laon. Thenceforward Laon was one of the principal towns of the kingdom of the Franks, and the possession of it was often disputed. Charles the Bald had enriched his church with the gift of very numerous domains. In about 847 the Irish philosopher John Scotus Eriugena appeared at the court of Charles the Bald, and was appointed head of the palace school. Eriugena spent the rest of his days in France, probably at Paris and Laon.

Laon was the principal city of the late Carolingian kings of France, beginning with Louis IV. After the fall of the Carolingians, Laon took the part of Charles of Lorraine, their heir, and Hugh Capet only succeeded in making himself master of the town by the connivance of the bishop, who, in return for this service, was made second ecclesiastical peer of the kingdom.

Early in the twelfth century the communes of France set about emancipating themselves, and the history of the commune of Laon is one of the richest and most varied. Anselm of Laon's school for theology and exegesis rapidly became the most famous in Europe. The citizens had profited by a temporary absence of Bishop Gaudry to secure from his representatives a communal charter, but he, on his return, purchased from the king of France the revocation of this document, and recommenced his oppressions. The consequence was a revolt, in which the episcopal palace was burnt and the bishop and several of his partisans were put to death on 25 April 1112. The fire spread to Laon Cathedral, and reduced it to ashes. Uneasy at the result of their victory, the rioters went into hiding outside the town, which was anew pillaged by the people of the neighbourhood, eager to avenge the death of their bishop.

Thereafter, French monarchs intervened as needed to settle disputes between the bishop and the townspeople until 1331, when the commune was abolished. In the latter stages of the 1337–1453 Hundred Years' War, Laon was captured by Philip, Duke of Burgundy; he relinquished control to his English allies, who held it until 1429 when it fell to Charles VII of France. The Catholic League used the town as a base during the French Wars of Religion; it was retaken by the former Huguenot Henry IV in August 1594.

=== Modern history ===
At the Revolution (1789) Laon permanently lost its rank as a bishopric. During the campaign of 1814, Napoleon tried in vain to dislodge Blücher and Bülow from it in the Battle of Laon. The Hôtel de Ville was completed in 1838.

In 1870, during the Franco-Prussian War, an engineer blew up the powder magazine of the citadel at the moment when the German troops were entering the town. Many people died; and the cathedral and the old episcopal palace were damaged. It surrendered to a German force on 9 September 1870.

In the autumn of 1914, during World War I, German forces captured the town and held it until the Allied offensive in the summer of 1918.

== Geography ==
Located in the middle of Aisne, Laon borders (from the north, clockwise) with the municipalities of Aulnois-sous-Laon, Barenton-Bugny, Chambry, Athies-sous-Laon, Bruyères-et-Montbérault, Vorges, Presles-et-Thierny, Chivy-lès-Étouvelles, Clacy-et-Thierret, Molinchart, Cerny-lès-Bucy, and Besny-et-Loizy. It is 55 km (34 mi) from Reims, 131 km (81 mi) from Amiens, and 138 km (86 mi) from Paris.

== Population ==
Historical population

Year	Pop.	±% p.a.
1793	7,500	—
1800	6,691	−1.62%
1806	6,976	+0.70%
1821	6,837	−0.13%
1831	8,400	+2.08%
1836	8,230	−0.41%
1841	9,406	+2.71%
1846	9,809	+0.84%
1851	10,098	+0.58%
1856	8,199	−4.08%
1861	10,090	+4.24%
1866	10,268	+0.35%
1872	10,365	+0.16%
1876	12,139	+4.03%
1881	12,623	+0.79%
1886	13,677	+1.62%
1891	14,129	+0.65%
1896	14,625	+0.69%
1901	15,434	+1.08%

Year	Pop.	±% p.a.
1906	15,288	−0.19%
1911	16,262	+1.24%
1921	18,904	+1.52%
1926	19,402	+0.52%
1931	19,125	−0.29%
1936	20,254	+1.15%
1946	17,401	−1.51%
1954	21,931	+2.93%
1962	25,078	+1.69%
1968	26,316	+0.81%
1975	27,914	+0.85%
1982	26,682	−0.64%
1990	26,490	−0.09%
1999	26,265	−0.09%
2007	26,463	+0.09%
2012	25,317	−0.88%
2017	24,876	−0.35%
2023	24,220	−0.44%

Source: EHESS and INSEE (1968-2023)

== Sights ==
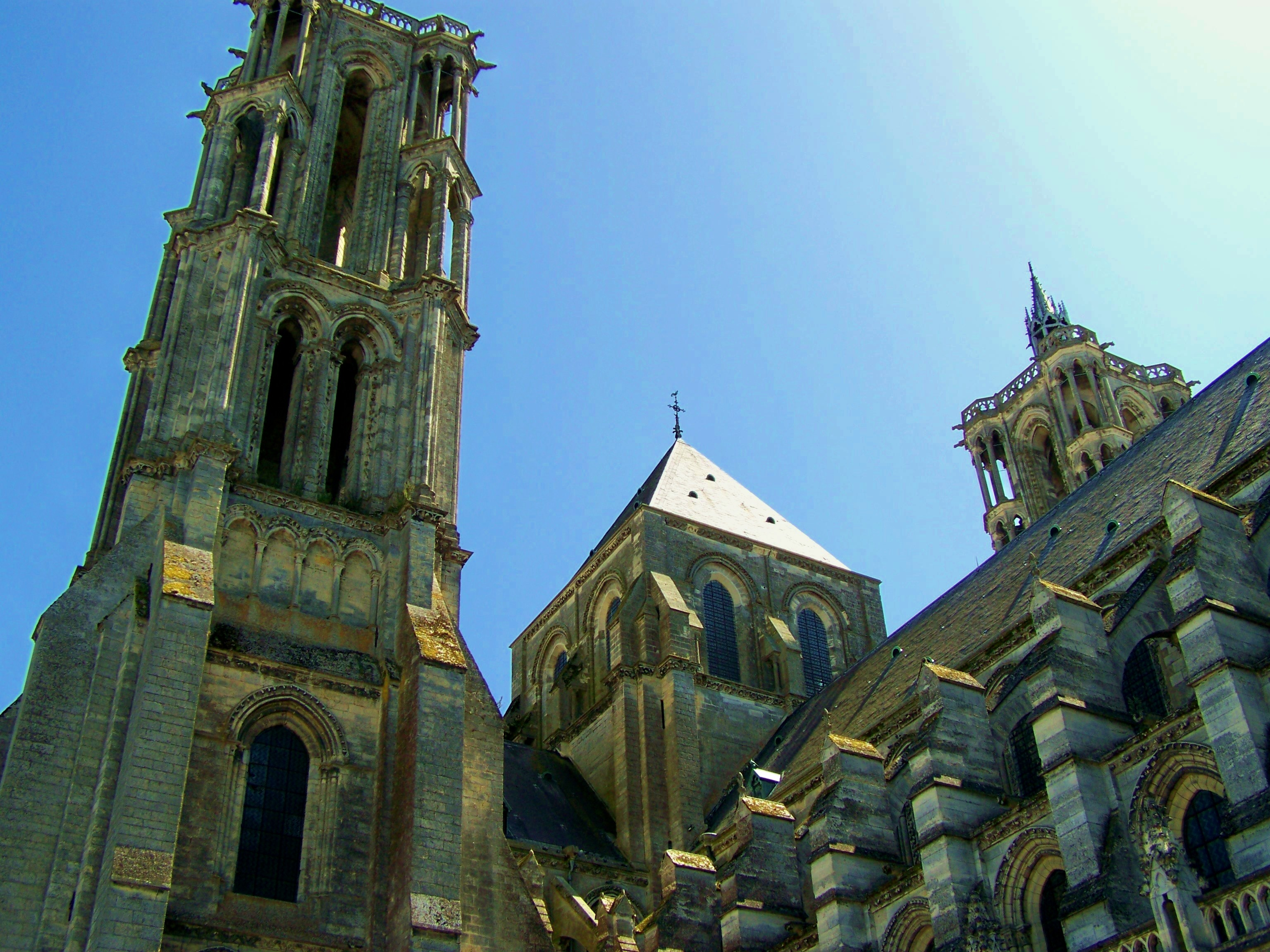
Cathedral of Notre-Dame of Laon

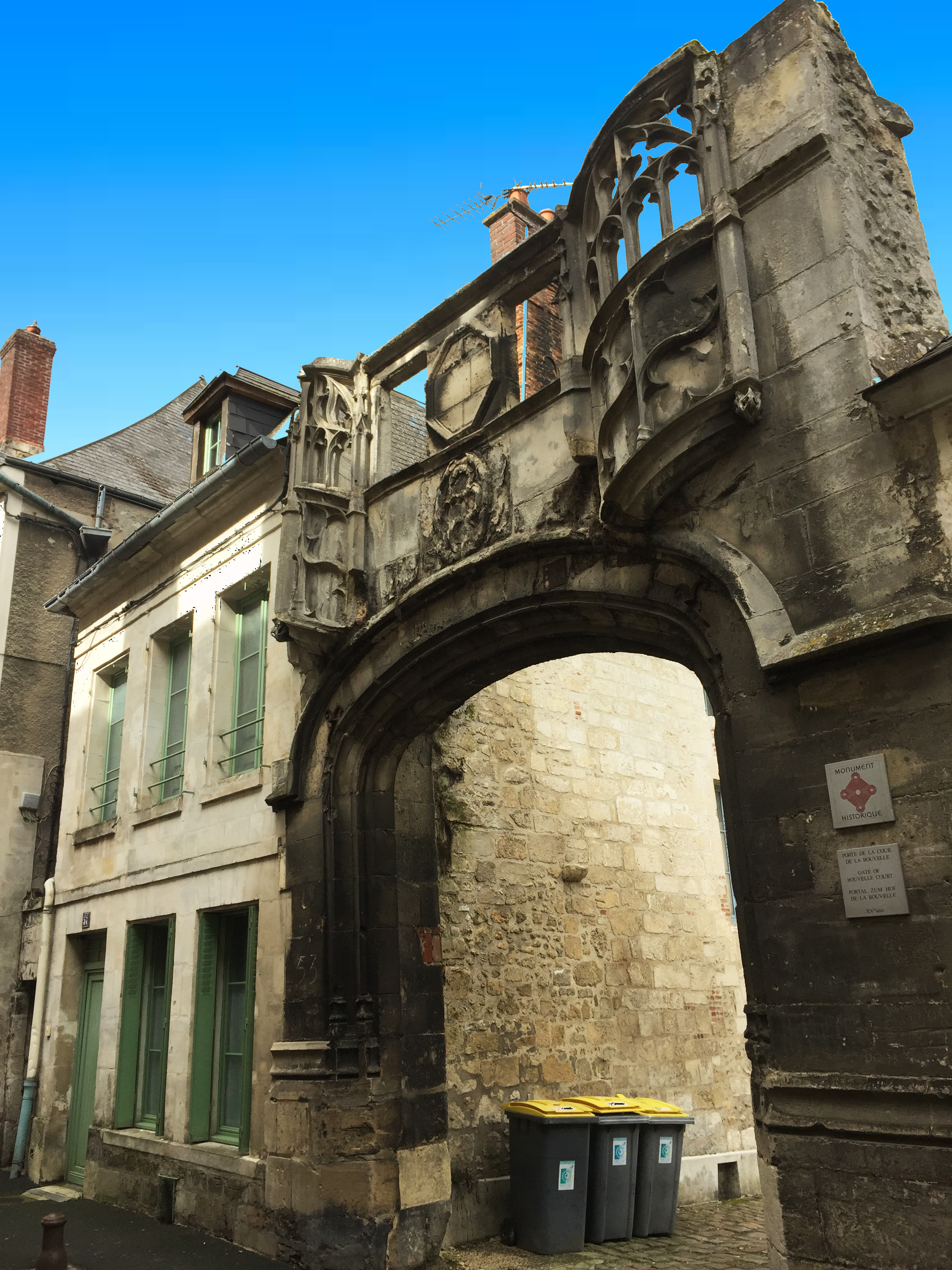
Gate of Bouvelle Court, Rue Serurier, Laon (France)

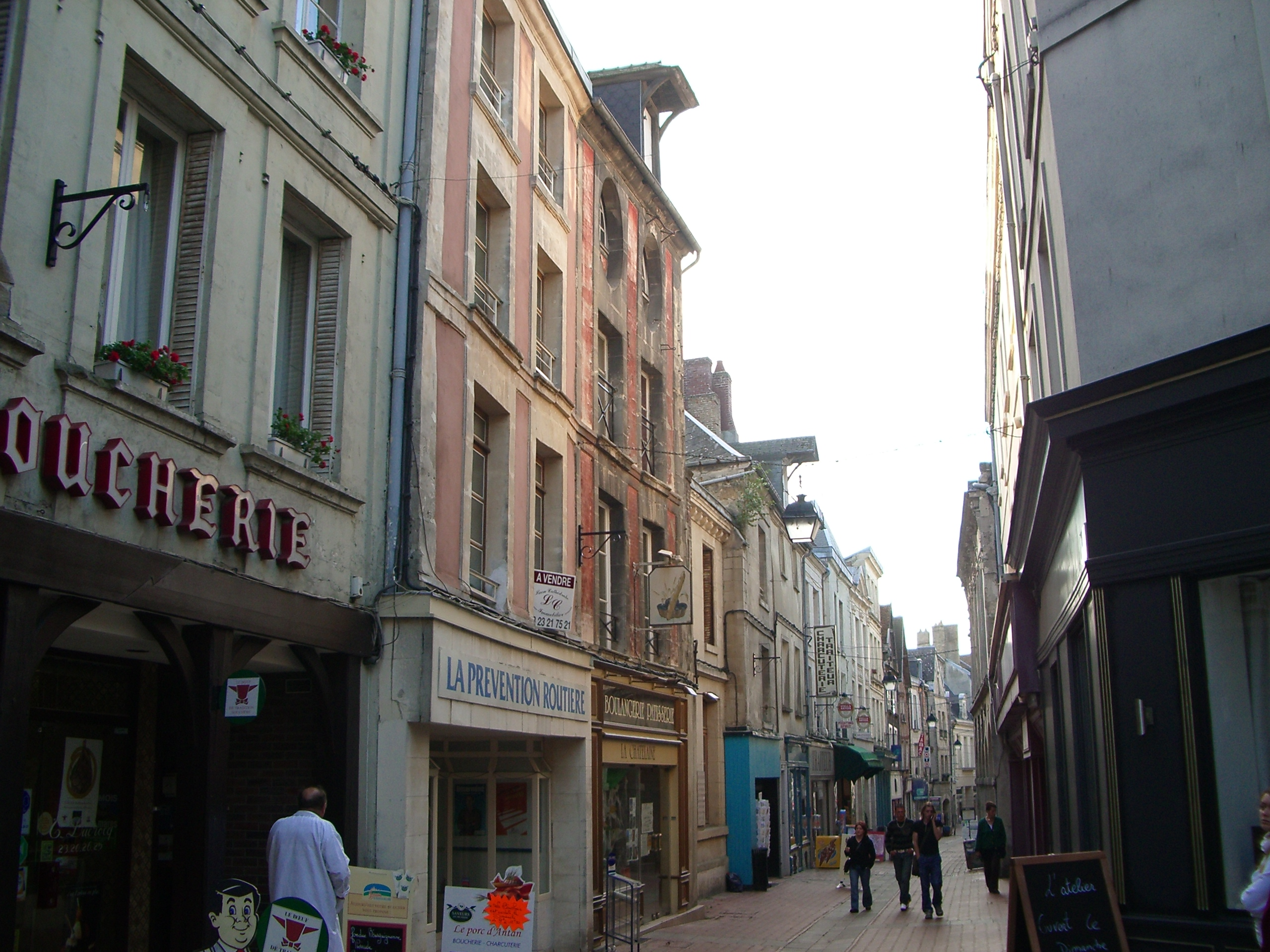
Rue Châtelaine

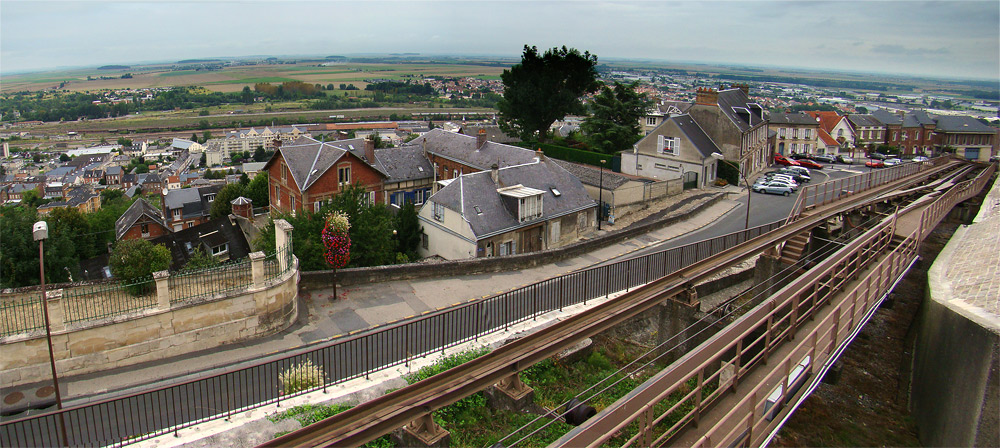
The former funicular, view from the upper town

The city contains numerous medieval buildings, including the cathedral Notre-Dame of Laon, dating mostly from the 12th and 13th centuries. The chapter-house and the cloister contain specimens of early 13th-century architecture. The old episcopal palace, contiguous to the cathedral, is now used as a court-house. The front, flanked by turrets, is pierced by large pointed windows. There is also a Gothic cloister and an old chapel of two storeys, of a date earlier than the cathedral.

The church of St Martin dates from the middle of the 12th century. The old abbey buildings of the same foundation are now used as the hospital. The museum of Laon had collections of sculpture and painting. In its garden there is a chapel of the Templars belonging to the 12th century.

One of the oldest churches in the city is St John the Baptist, in the nearby neighbourhood of Vaux-sous-Laon, which dates from the 11th through 13th centuries and is built in a mixture of Romanesque and Gothic styles.

== Transportation ==
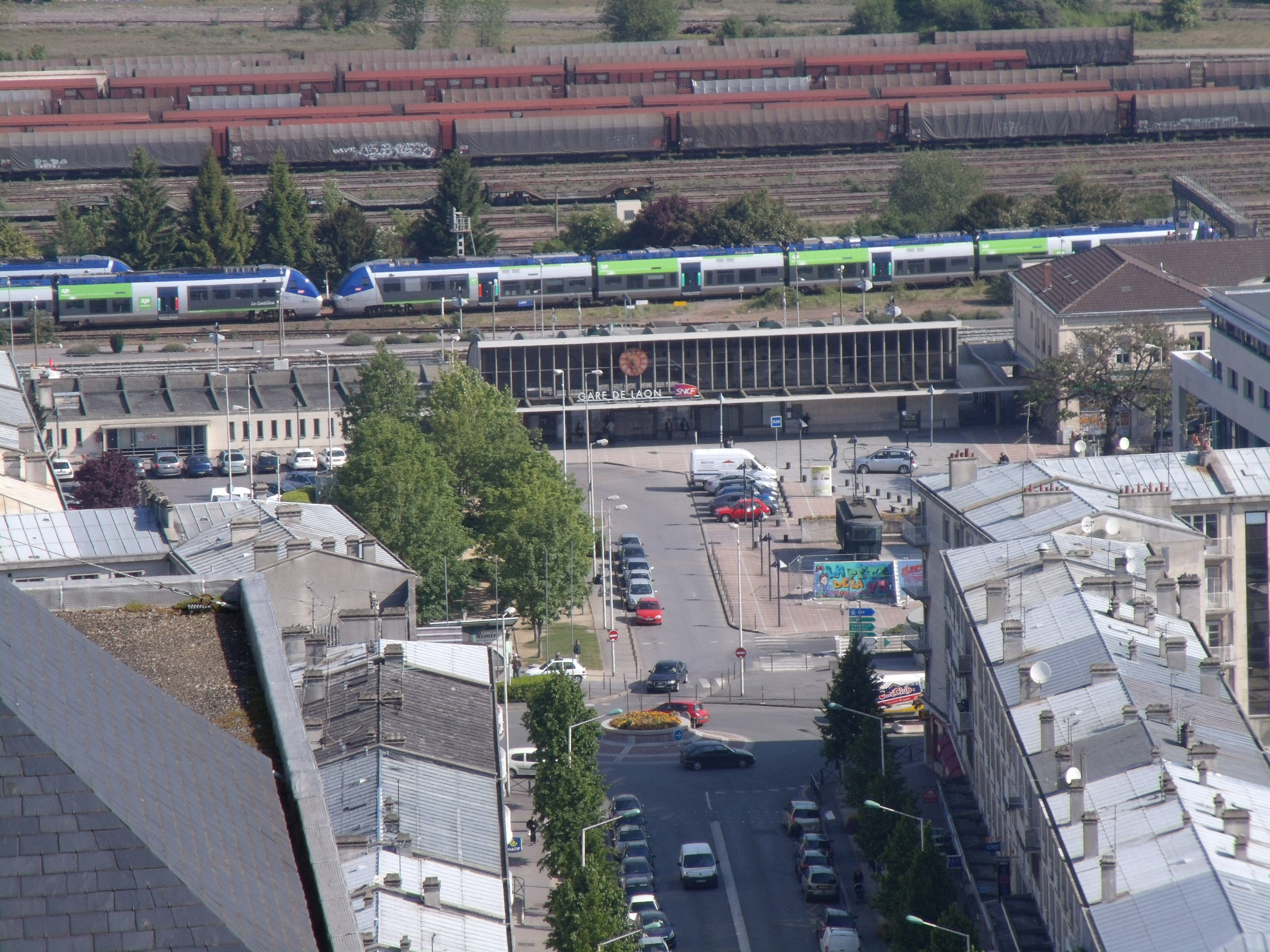
Laon station from the upper town

Laon railway station offers connections to Reims, Soissons and Paris.

Until August 2016, the town had the only fully automated municipal cable car system in the world, called the Poma 2000. It linked the upper town (the historical centre, located on a plateau) with the lower town, had three stations and ran on rubber tyres. In contrast, the San Francisco cable car system is manually operated, and most other automated cable car systems have restricted operations within airports and hospitals, though another automated cable car called the Minimetrò may be found in the city of Perugia in Italy.

The town's transport company TUL (Transports Urbains Laonnois) operates the local bus routes.

== International relations ==
Laon is twinned with:

- Soltau, Germany (since 1972)
- Winchester, United Kingdom

== Notable people ==
- Bertrada of Laon (690–721 AD), mother of Charlemagne
- Anselm of Laon (d. 1117), theologian
- Father Jacques Marquette (1636–1675), Jesuit missionary, Namesake of Marquette University along with scores of other institutions and locales in the United States
- Antoine (ca. 1598–1648), Louis (ca. 1600/1605-1648) and Mathieu (1607–1677) Le Nain, painters
- Pierre Méchain (1744–1804), astronomer
- Auguste Bottée de Toulmon (1764–1816), general inspector of powders and saltpetre
- Edgar Raoul-Duval (1832–1887), magistrate and politician
- Florent Raimy (b. 1986), footballer

== Gallery ==
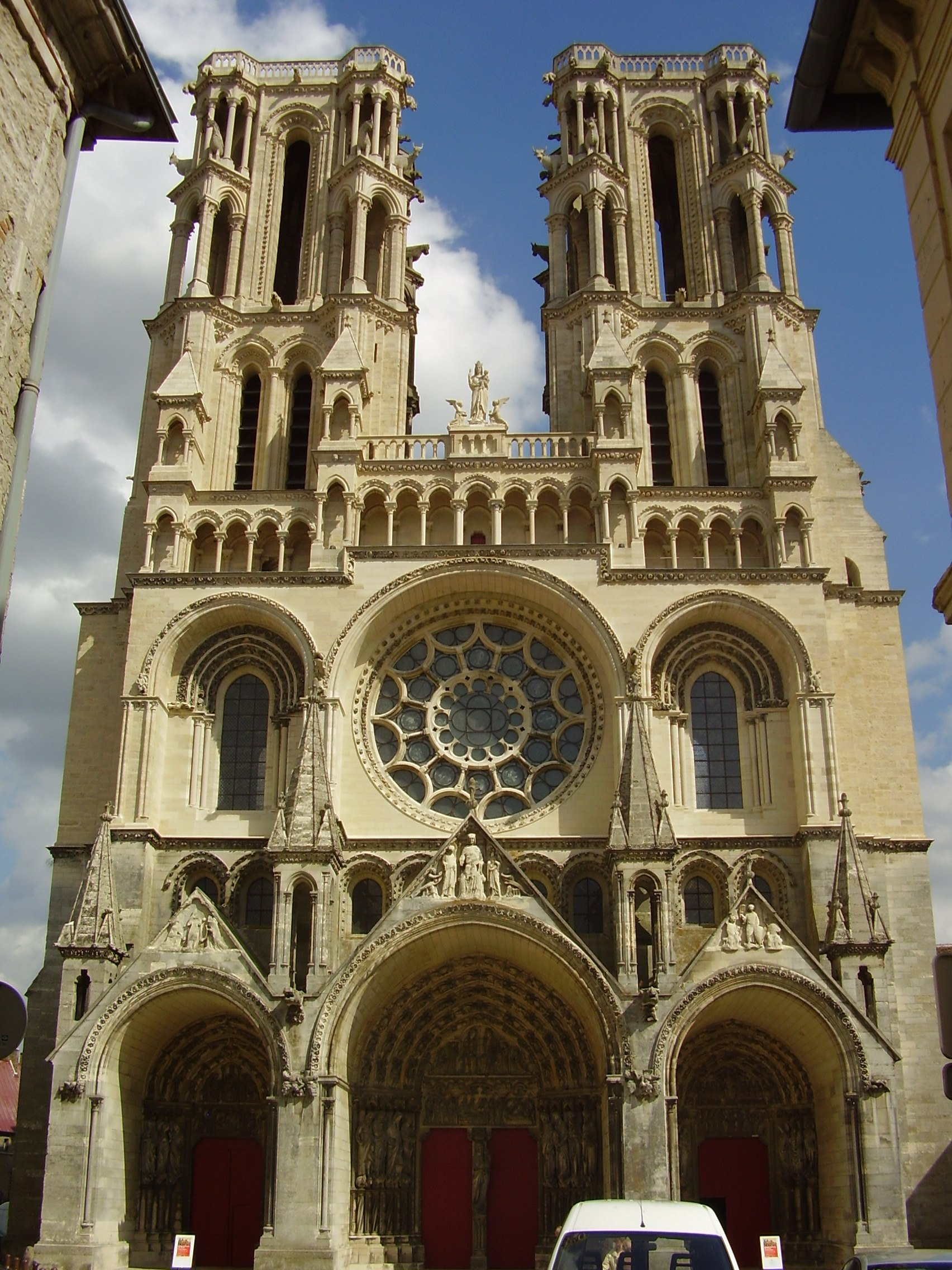
The cathedral, western front

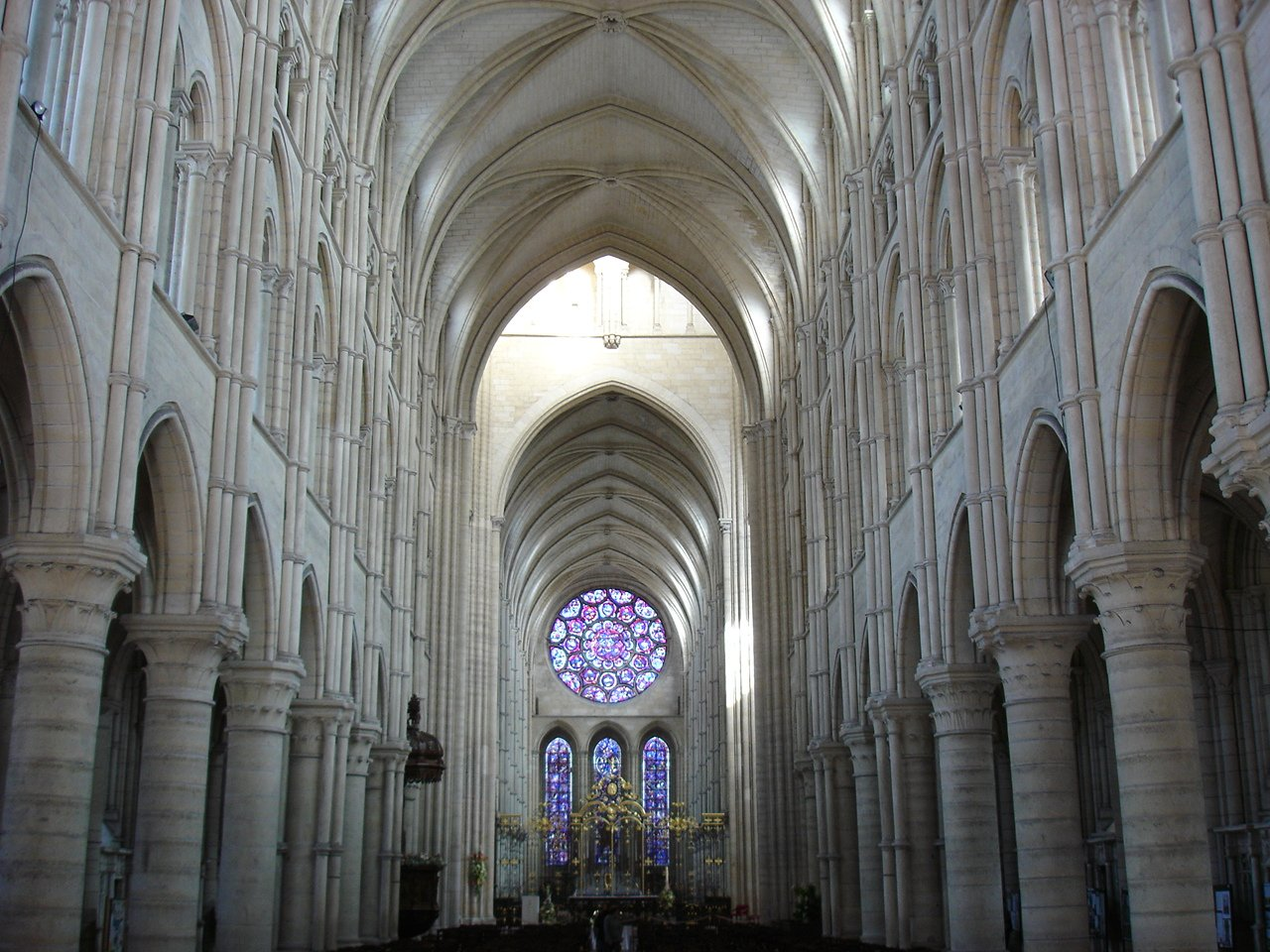
The cathedral, interior

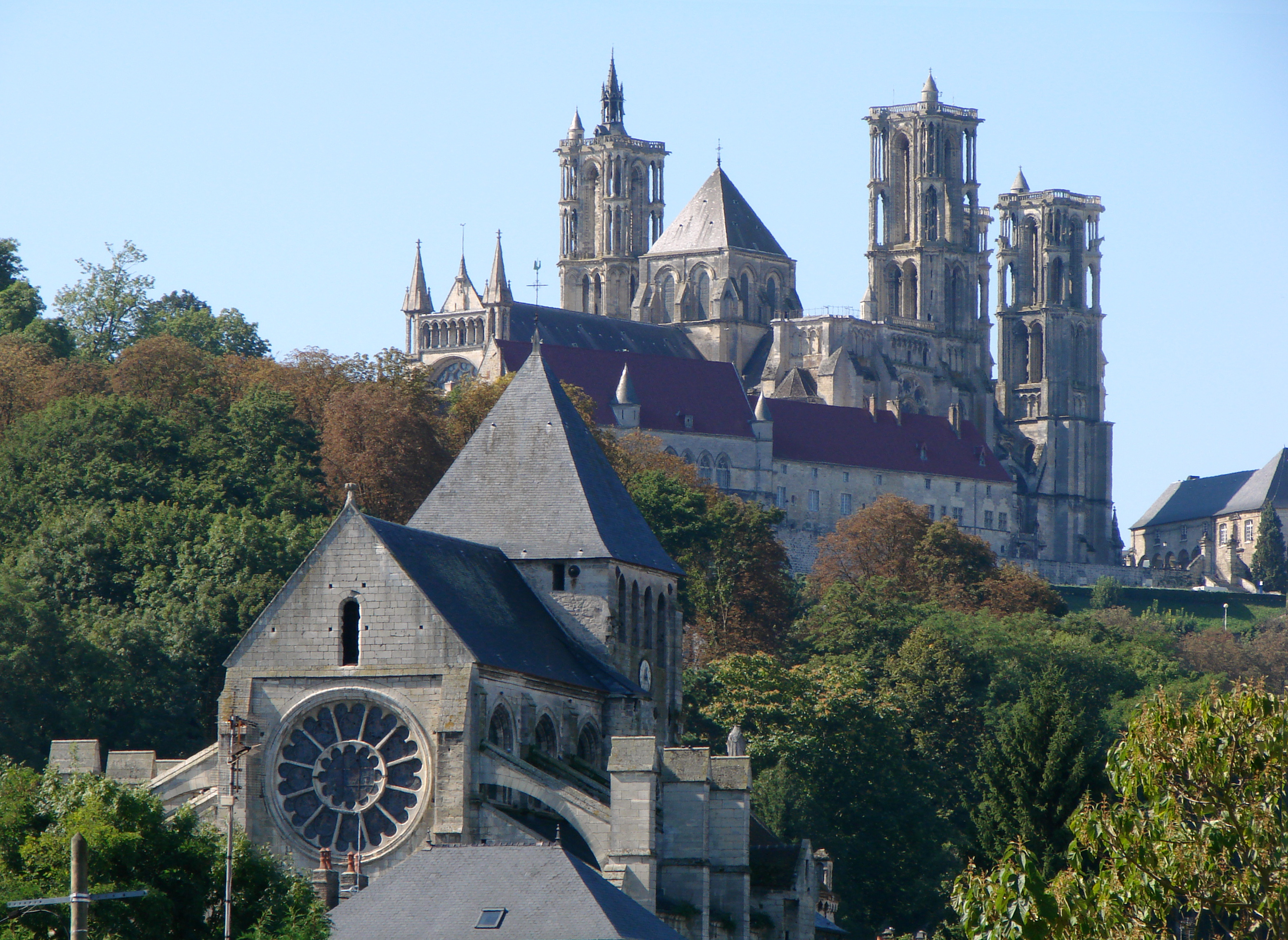
View from the lower city, with the cathedral in the background and St John the Baptist de Vaux in the foreground

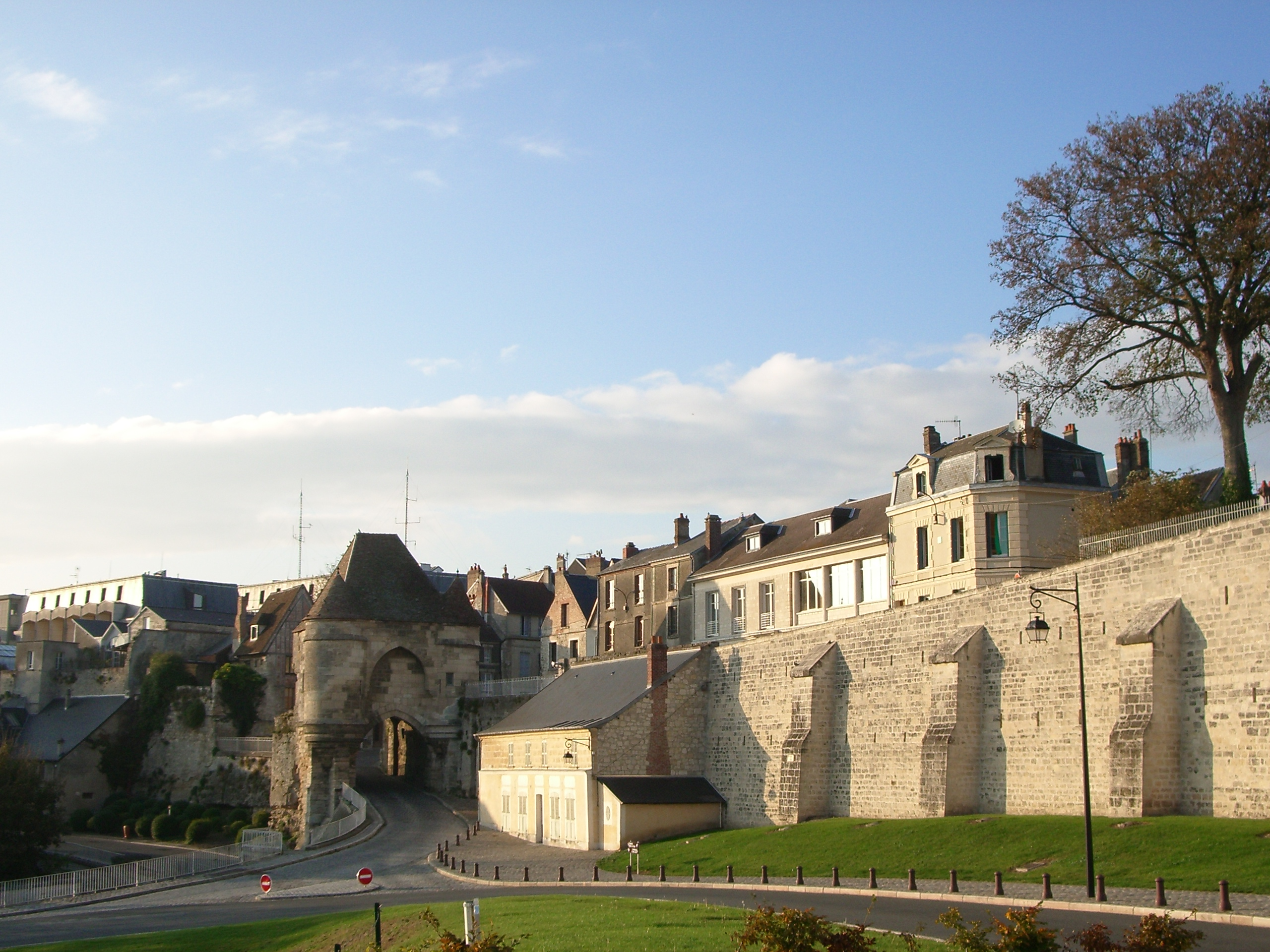
Porte d’Ardon and city walls

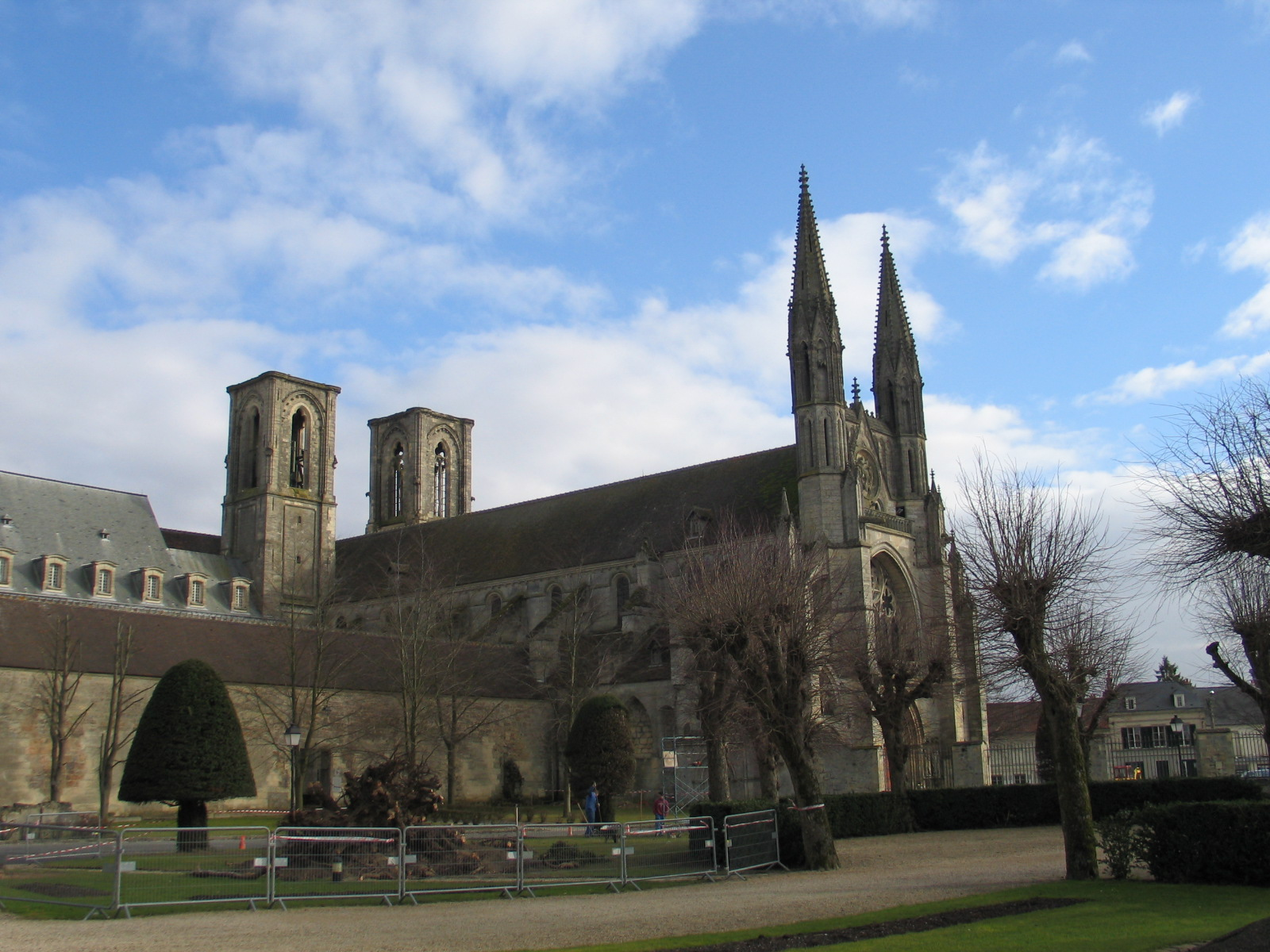
St Martin's church

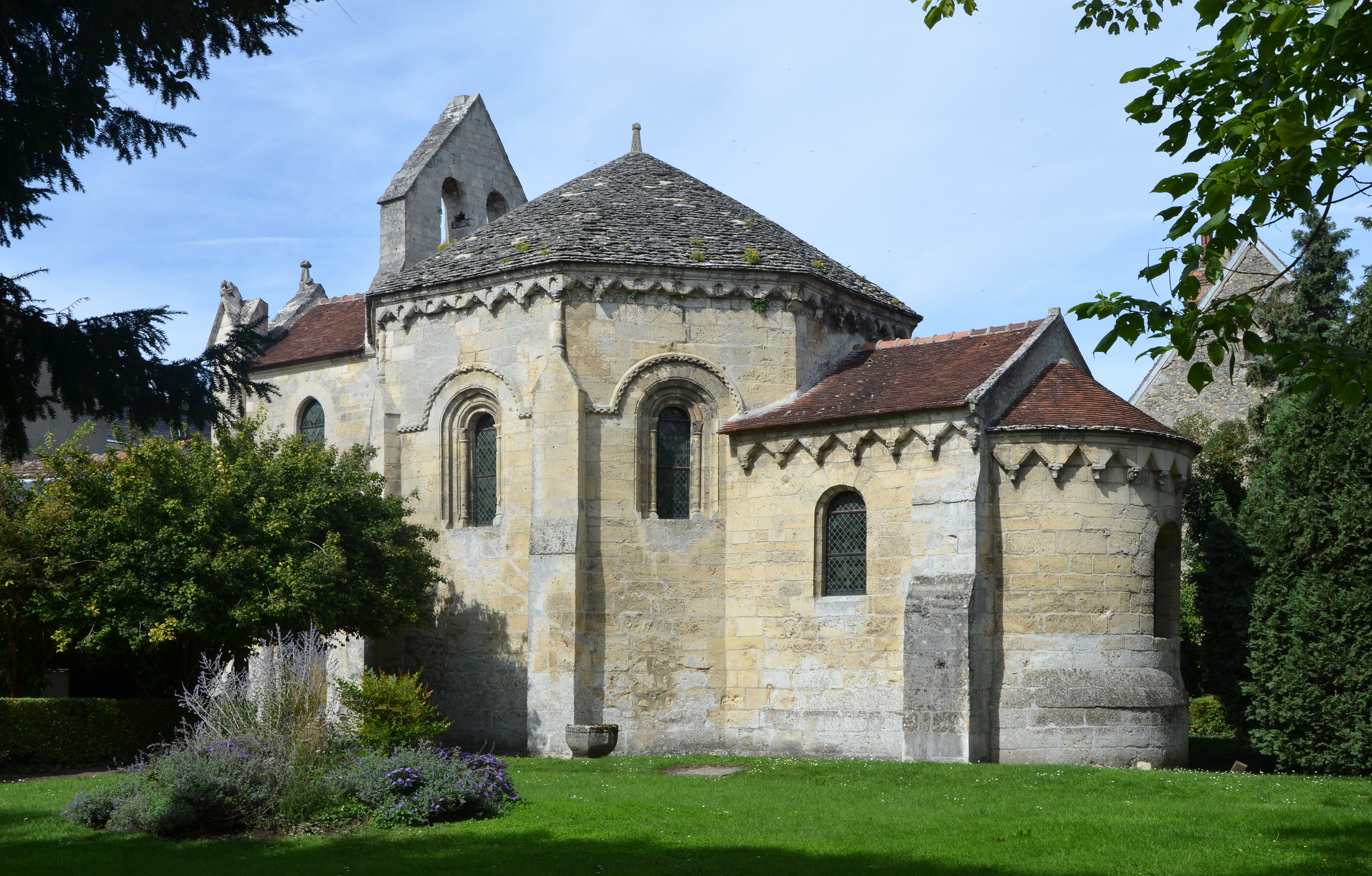
Templars chapel

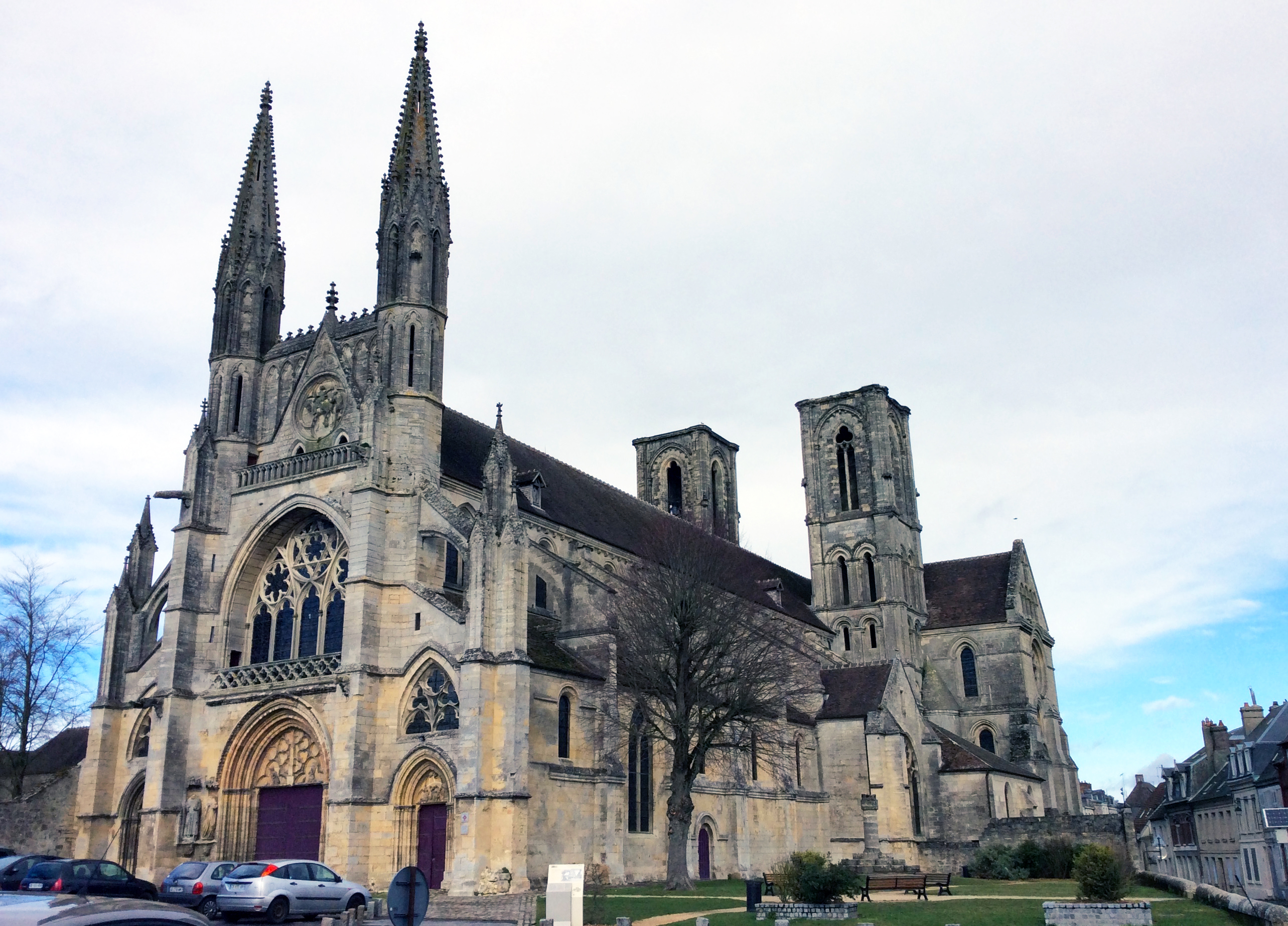
St Martin's church

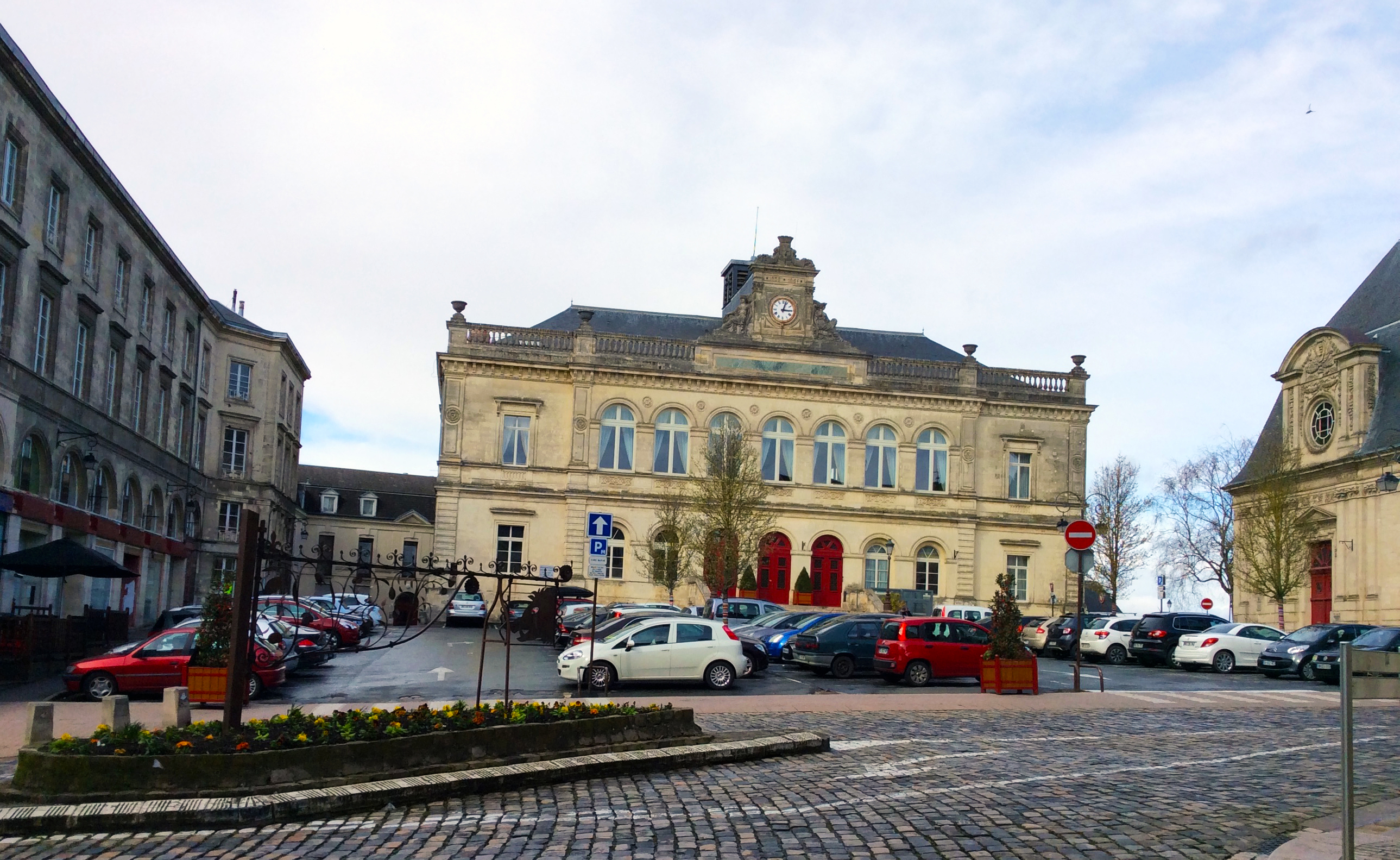
The Hôtel de Ville

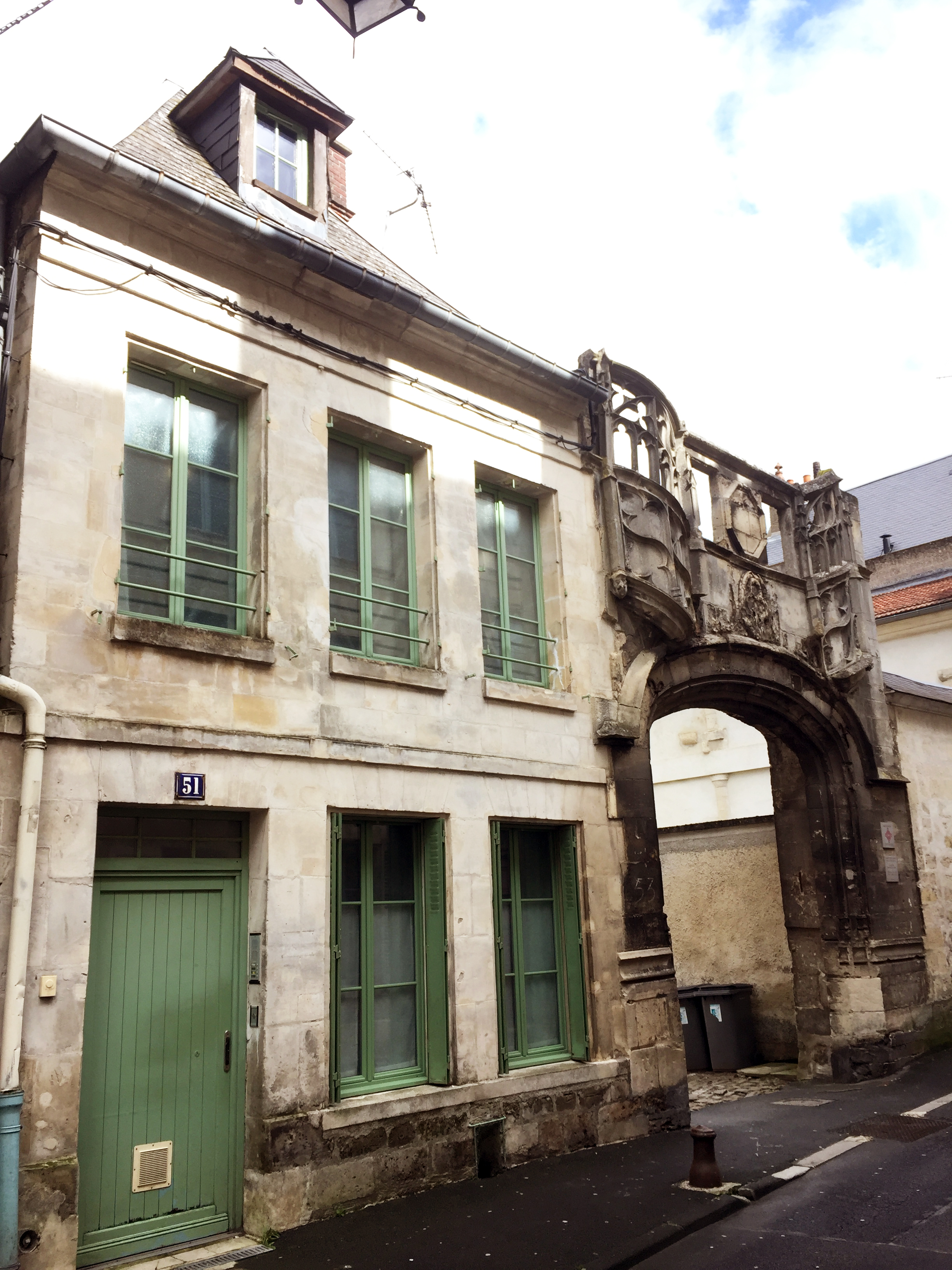
Porte De La Cour De La Bouvelle (Medieval Architecture, XV)

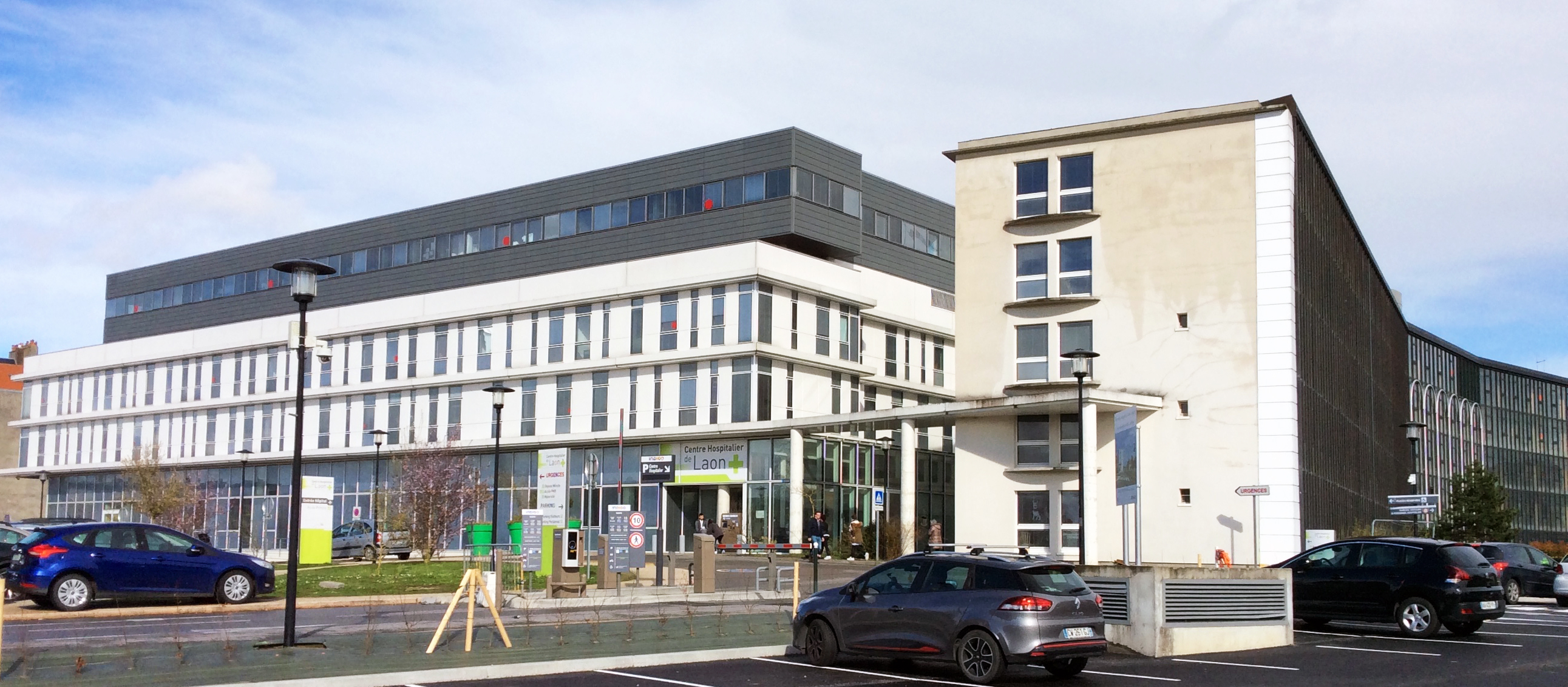
Centre Hospitalier de Laon, France

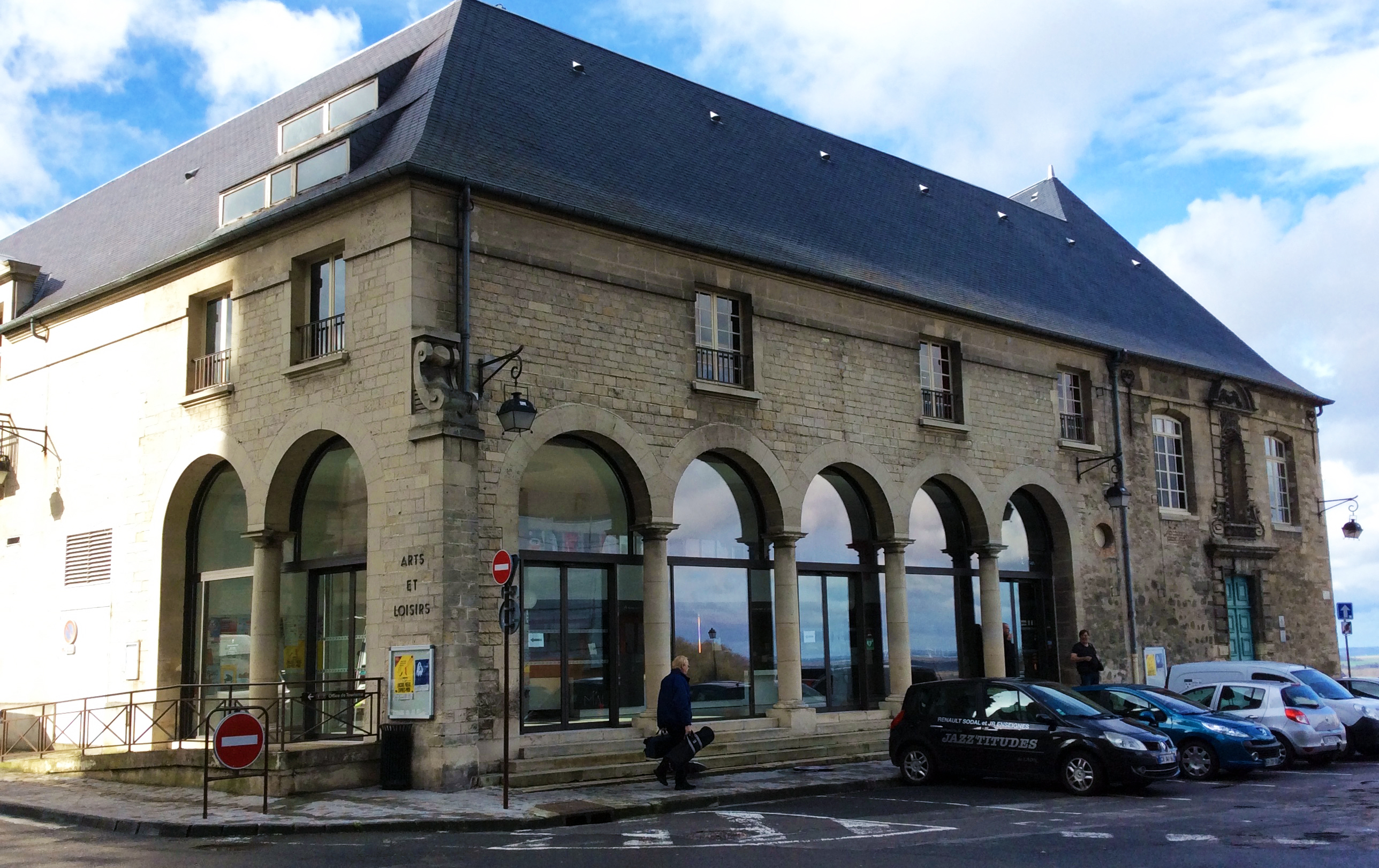
Maison des Arts et Loisirs, Laon, France

== In the media ==
Laon is featured in the book Pursuit of Passy by David Moore Crook.

Laon is also featured in the book A Pilgrimage to Eternity by Timothy Egan.

== Climate ==
Climate data for Laon (Aulnois-sous-Laon) (1991–2020 normals, extremes 1988–present)
Month	Jan	Feb	Mar	Apr	May	Jun	Jul	Aug	Sep	Oct	Nov	Dec	Year
Record high °C (°F)	16.3 (61.3)	19.9 (67.8)	25.6 (78.1)	28.0 (82.4)	31.2 (88.2)	35.7 (96.3)	40.8 (105.4)	38.9 (102.0)	34.4 (93.9)	27.2 (81.0)	20.0 (68.0)	16.8 (62.2)	40.8 (105.4)
Mean daily maximum °C (°F)	6.3 (43.3)	7.5 (45.5)	11.8 (53.2)	15.6 (60.1)	19.1 (66.4)	22.2 (72.0)	25.0 (77.0)	24.8 (76.6)	20.7 (69.3)	15.6 (60.1)	10.0 (50.0)	6.8 (44.2)	15.5 (59.9)
Daily mean °C (°F)	3.8 (38.8)	4.4 (39.9)	7.4 (45.3)	10.1 (50.2)	13.7 (56.7)	16.6 (61.9)	19.0 (66.2)	18.8 (65.8)	15.4 (59.7)	11.6 (52.9)	7.2 (45.0)	4.4 (39.9)	11.0 (51.8)
Mean daily minimum °C (°F)	1.3 (34.3)	1.2 (34.2)	2.9 (37.2)	4.6 (40.3)	8.2 (46.8)	10.9 (51.6)	12.9 (55.2)	12.8 (55.0)	10.1 (50.2)	7.6 (45.7)	4.3 (39.7)	2.1 (35.8)	6.6 (43.9)
Record low °C (°F)	−17.0 (1.4)	−16.1 (3.0)	−13.5 (7.7)	−6.0 (21.2)	−1.0 (30.2)	1.5 (34.7)	4.1 (39.4)	2.2 (36.0)	−0.8 (30.6)	−6.0 (21.2)	−10.2 (13.6)	−15.5 (4.1)	−17.0 (1.4)
Average precipitation mm (inches)	60.2 (2.37)	51.3 (2.02)	50.2 (1.98)	44.2 (1.74)	58.7 (2.31)	61.0 (2.40)	62.1 (2.44)	62.8 (2.47)	47.0 (1.85)	56.9 (2.24)	56.0 (2.20)	75.2 (2.96)	685.6 (26.99)
Average precipitation days (≥ 1.0 mm)	11.4	10.5	9.6	9.1	9.8	9.2	9.1	8.8	8.8	10.1	10.8	12.5	119.6
Source: Meteociel

== See also ==
- Marcel Gaumont, Sculptor of war memorial
