= Auguste Bottée de Toulmon (the younger) =

French composer and musicologist

- Born: 15 May 1797; Paris
- Died: 22 March 1850 (aged 52); Paris
- Occupations: Composer; Musicologist

Auguste Bottée de Toulmon (15 May 1797 – 22 March 1850) was a 19th-century French composer and musicologist.

== Biography ==
A polytechnician (1817), he had to leave the École polytechnique for health reason and became a lawyer (1823) then decided to devote himself to music. A student of Cherubini and Reicha, he became librarian at the Conservatoire de Paris (1831–1846).

He was the son of inventor Auguste Bottée de Toulmon (1764–1816).

== Works ==
=== Compositions ===
He is the author of several masses, one oratorio and one opéra comique.

=== Musicology ===
He wrote numerous texts on musical archaeology.

- 1836: De la chanson française au Moyen Age
- 1838: Des puys de palinods au Moyen Age
- 1844: Dissertation sur les instruments de musique employés au moyen âge.
- 1857: Instructions sur la musique

== Bibliography ==
- Notice sur la vie et les travaux de M. Auguste Bottée de Toulmon: Read online
- Tilman Seebass, De l'image à l'objet : la méthode critique en iconographie, 1988, p. 36
