= Auguste Bottée de Toulmon =

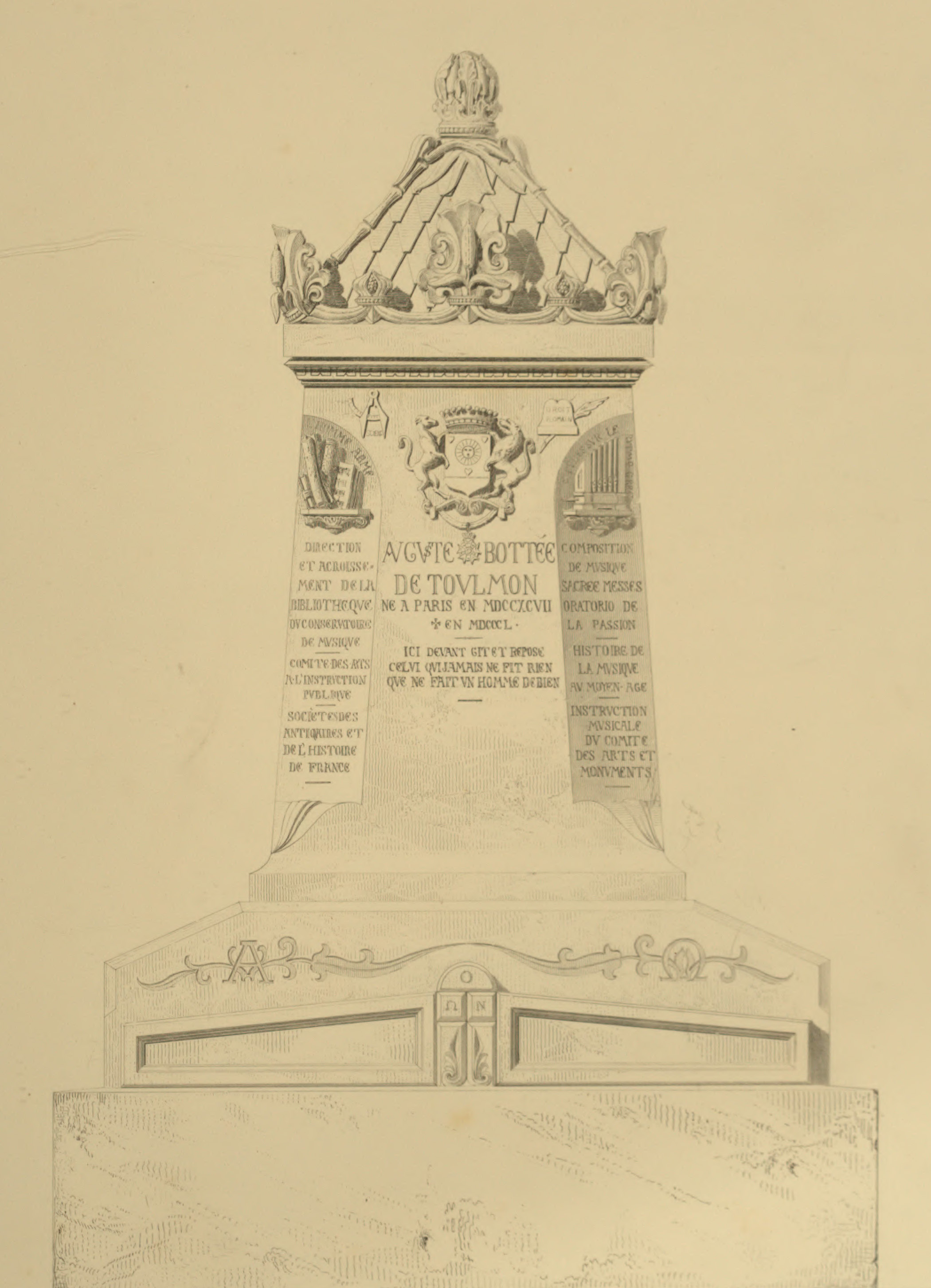
Revue générale de l'architecture et des travaux publics, V11, 1853, Planche 16

Jean-Joseph-Auguste Bottée de Toulmon (6 February 1764 in Laon – 18 October 1815 in Tourny) was a French general manager of powders and saltpeter.

== Biography ==
A general manager of powders and saltpeter during the National Convention, a professor at the École polytechnique (1812-1816), Bottée de Toulmon established the powder mill of Maromme, near Rouen.

He is the inventor of a hydrostatic test tube used to determine the explosive force of powders.

Musicologist Auguste Bottée de Toulmon (1797-1850) was his son.

== Works ==
- 1812: Art de fabriquer la poudre à canon (with Riffault)
- 1812: Art du salpêtrier
