= Hôtel de Ville, Laon =

Town hall in Laon, France

Hôtel de Ville
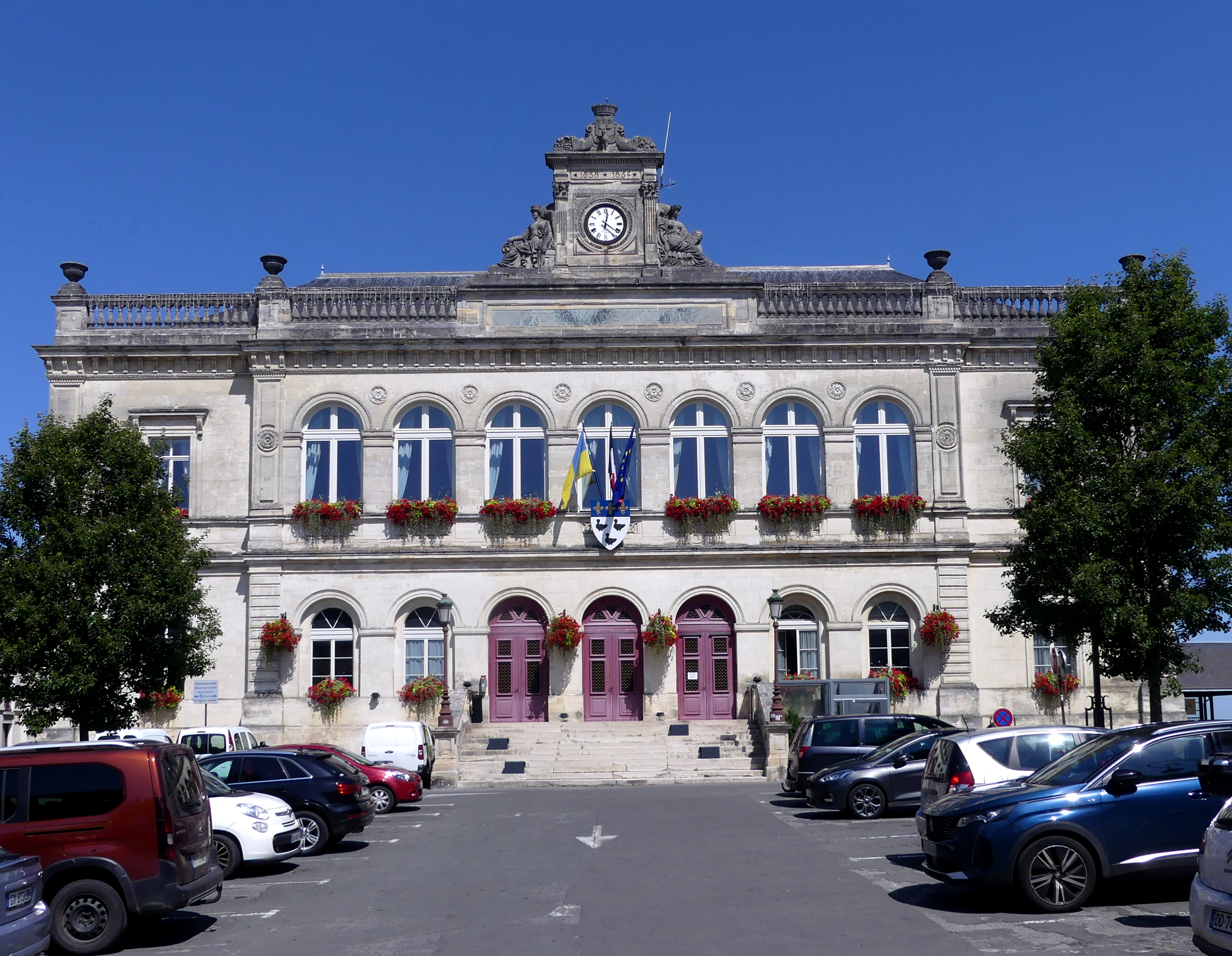
- The main frontage of the Hôtel de Ville in July 2024
- Interactive map of the Hôtel de Ville area

General information
- Type: City hall
- Architectural style: Neoclassical style
- Location: Orly, France
- Coordinates: 49.5650°N 3.6206°E
- Completed: 1838

Design and construction
- Architect: Jean Charles Bringol

The Hôtel de Ville (French pronunciation: [otɛl də vil], City Hall) is a municipal building in Laon, Aisne, in northern France, standing on Place du Général Leclerc.

== History ==
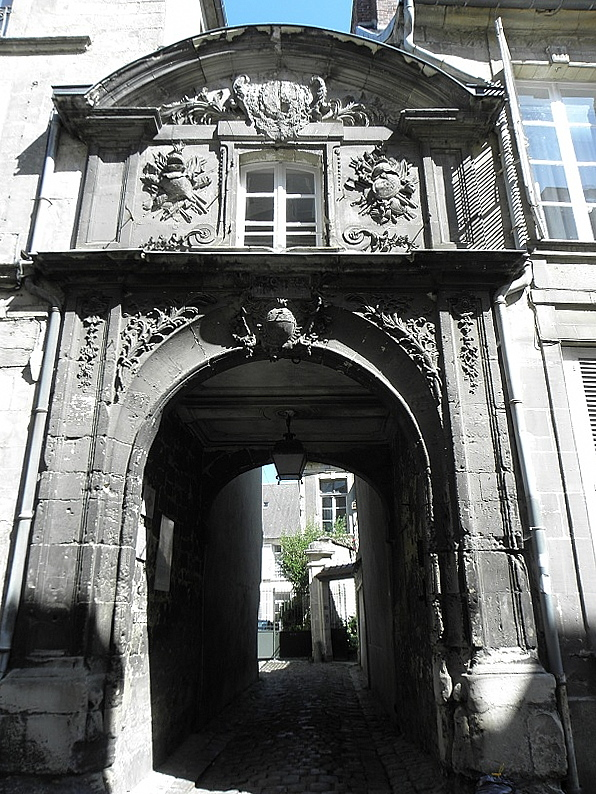
The old town hall

The first municipal building in Laon was the Appelé Maison des Plaids du Roi (King's Pleas House) on the north side of Rue Sérurier in the old part of the town. It was designed in the medieval style, built in limestone blocks and dated back at least to the first quarter of the 16th century. The building was acquired by the mayor and aldermen of Laon in 1702 and subsequently remodelled with a new staircase being installed around that time. A monumental portal was erected by a mason from Bruyères, Louis Maillefert, in 1736. Although much of the building was later demolished, the portal survives and has been in private ownership since the early 19th century.

Following the French Revolution, the old town hall was acquired by the state in exchange for the Royal Palace which then became the meeting place of the newly elected town council. The Royal Palace had been commissioned by Louis IV in the first half of the 10th century. Located in the town square (now Place du Général Leclerc), it was used by the late Carolingian monarchs and then by the Capetian monarchs. However, the complex was abandoned by Louis VII in the mid-12th century and, although a large circular keep was added by Philip II in the late 12th century, the complex was converted into a Franciscan monastery by Louis IX in the 13th century. By that time, the layout involved a chapel, some residential buildings, and the keep.

By the early 1830s, the former Royal Palace was dilapidated and the town council decided to demolish it and to commission a purpose-built town hall on the site. The new building was designed by Jean Charles Bringol in the neoclassical style, built in ashlar stone and was completed in 1838.

The design of the new building involved a symmetrical main frontage of nine bays facing onto the town square. The central section of seven bays, which was slightly projected forward, featured three round headed doorways flanked, on either side, by two round headed windows. The first floor was fenestrated by a row of round-headed windows. There were medallions in the spandrels of the central section and the end bays were fenestrated by cross-windows with cornices on both floors. At roof level, there was a balustraded parapet, which was broken by a clock supported by figures sculpted by Élie Badré, and four urns. Internally, the principal rooms were the Salle des Cérémonies (ceremonies room) and the Salle des Mariages (wedding room). A fine painting by Albert Anker, depicting a group of people leaving a church, was presented to the people of Laon by Napoleon III in 1863.

A statue of Marshal Jean-Mathieu-Philibert Sérurier on a pedestal was installed in the square in front of the town hall also in 1863.

In September 1914, during the First World War, German troops under the command of General Josias von Heeringen occupied the town and established a command post in the town hall. The German troops toppled the statue of Marshal Sérurier and melted it down for armaments, before abandoning the town in summer 1918. The town was occupied by German troops again during the Second World War. Following the liberation of the town on 30 August 1944, local people assembled in front of the town hall to celebrate the event.
