= Val-de-Reuil =

- Commune
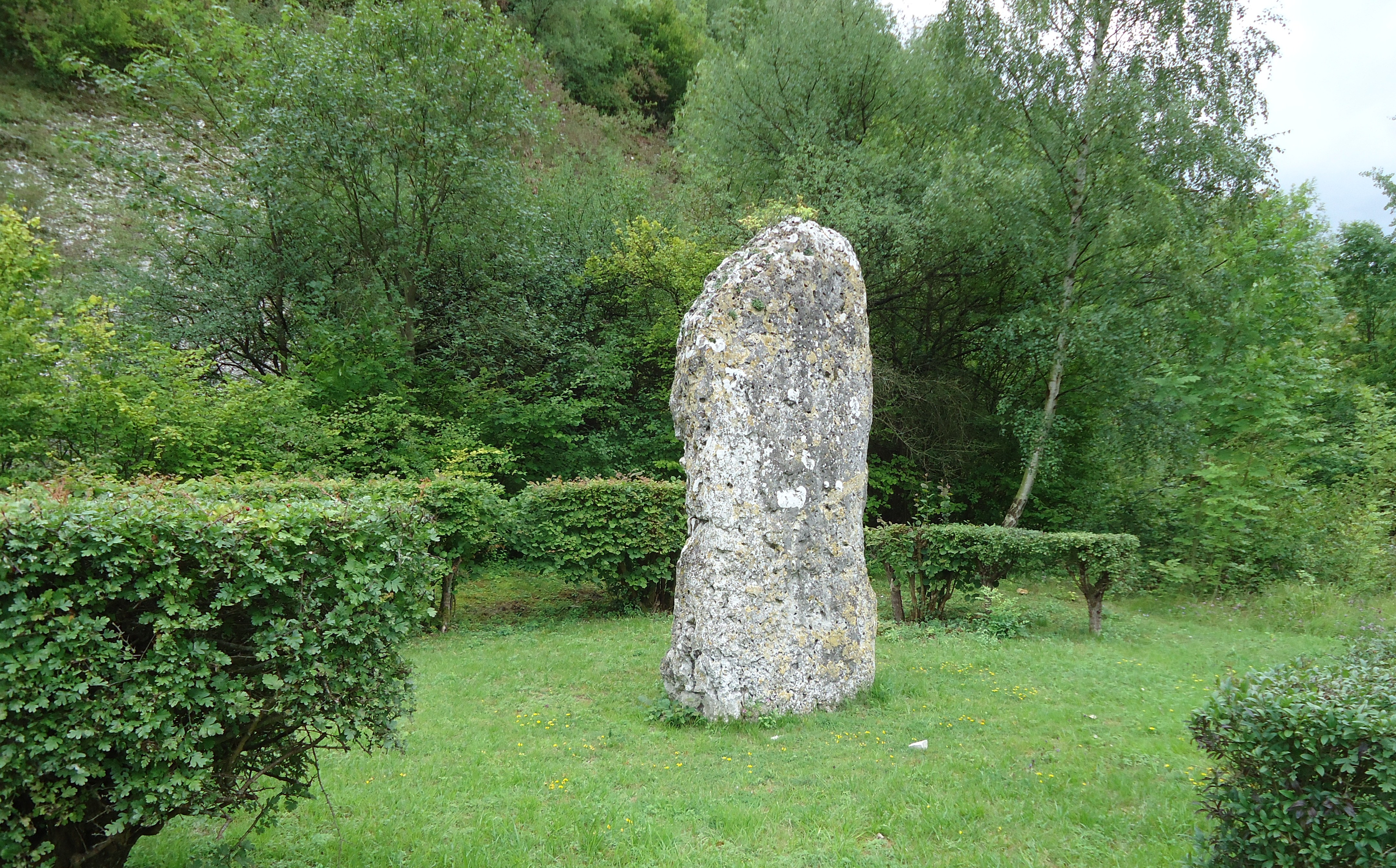
- The menhir of La Basse Crémonville

- Coat of arms
- Location of Val-de-Reuil
- Location within France Location within Normandy
- Coordinates: 49°17′N 1°13′E
- Country: France
- Region: Normandy
- Department: Eure
- Arrondissement: Les Andelys
- Canton: Val-de-Reuil
- Intercommunality: CA Seine-Eure

Government
  - Mayor (2020–2026): Marc-Antoine Jamet
- Area^{1}: 26.61 km^{2} (10.27 sq mi)
- Elevation: 13 m (43 ft)
- Highest elevation: 120 m (390 ft)
- Lowest elevation: 4 m (13 ft)
- Population (2023): 13,245
  - Density: 497.7/km^{2} (1,289/sq mi)
- Time zone: UTC+01:00 (CET)
  - Summer (DST): UTC+02:00 (CEST)
- INSEE/Postal code: 27701 /27100
- ^{1} French Land Register data, which excludes lakes, ponds, glaciers > 1 km^{2} (0.386 sq mi or 247 acres) and river estuaries.

Val-de-Reuil (French pronunciation: [val də ʁœj]; lit. 'Vale of Reuil') is a commune in the Eure department in Normandy in north-western France. It is located south of Rouen in a loop of the Seine. Created as the new town of Le Vaudreuil in 1972, its name was changed to Val-de-Reuil in 1984 to avoid confusion with its neighbour, Le Vaudreuil.

== Population ==
The inhabitants of Val-de-Reuil are called Rolivalois in French. Population data refer to the commune in its geography as of January 2025.

Historical population
Year	Pop.	±% p.a.
1968	398	—
1975	378	−0.73%
1982	4,400	+42.00%
1990	11,359	+12.59%
1999	13,245	+1.72%
2007	13,548	+0.28%
2012	13,407	−0.21%
2017	13,063	−0.52%
2023	13,245	+0.23%
Source: INSEE

== History ==
Le Vaudreuil (ensemble urbain) was one of the nine new towns created in France in the beginning of the 1970s.

- June 1972: creation of the Établissement public d'aménagement of the new town of Le Vaudreuil.
- December 1972: creation of the urban community (ensemble urbain) of Le Vaudreuil on the territory of several existing communes including Le Vaudreuil.
- 28 September 1981: the urban community became a commune, created from parts of the communes Incarville, Léry, Porte-Joie, Poses, Saint-Étienne-du-Vauvray, Saint-Pierre-du-Vauvray, Tournedos-sur-Seine and Le Vaudreuil. The new commune was named Vaudreuil-Ex Ensemble Urbain.
- 19 November 1984: the commune changed its name to Val-de-Reuil to avoid confusion with nearby Le Vaudreuil.
- December, 1985: the dissolution of the établissement public d'aménagement, whose competences were transferred into the commune.
- 1996: Val-de-Reuil joined a communauté de communes with Louviers and Incarville.
- 2001: Val-de-Reuil became part of the Communauté d'agglomération Seine-Eure which has its principal centre in Louviers.

== Administration ==
Val-de-Reuil is the seat of a canton, which includes eight communes and has a total population of 20,422 (2021).

== Points of interest ==
- Biotropica, les jardins animaliers is a zoo covering 10 hectares that was established in 2012. The zoo has over 2000 animals, across 200 species.

== International relations ==
Val-de-Reuil is twinned with Workington in the United Kingdom.

== See also ==
- Communes of the Eure department
