= La Haye =

La Haye may refer to:

- The Hague in the Netherlands (French: La Haye)

Locations in Belgium

- La Haye, Lasne, a farmhouse at the eastern end of the Waterloo Battlefield
- La Haye Sainte, a farmhouse at the centre of the Waterloo Battlefield
- La Haye, Saint-Amand or Saint-Amand-la-Haye, a hamlet at the centre of the Ligny Battlefield

Communes in France:

- La Haye, Manche, in the Manche département
- La Haye, Seine-Maritime, in the Seine-Maritime département
- La Haye, Vosges, in the Vosges département
- La Haye-Aubrée, in the Eure département
- La Haye-Bellefond, in the Manche département
- La Haye-de-Calleville, in the Eure département
- La Haye-d'Ectot, in the Manche département
- La Haye-de-Routot, in the Eure département
- La Haye-du-Theil, in the Eure département
- La Haye-en-Touraine (currently named Descartes), in the Indre-et-Loire département, the birthplace of René Descartes
- La Haye-le-Comte, in the Eure département
- La Haye-Malherbe, in the Eure département
- La Haye-Pesnel, in the Manche département
- La Haye-Saint-Sylvestre, in the Eure département

== See also ==
- Tim LaHaye
- LaHaye Ice Center
