= Tostes =

- Part of Terres de Bord
- Location of Tostes
- Location within France Location within Normandy
- Coordinates: 49°15′37″N 1°06′45″E
- Country: France
- Region: Normandy
- Department: Eure
- Arrondissement: Les Andelys
- Canton: Pont-de-l'Arche
- Commune: Terres de Bord
- Area^{1}: 12.28 km^{2} (4.74 sq mi)
- Elevation: 130 m (430 ft)
- Highest elevation: 137 m (449 ft)
- Lowest elevation: 79 m (259 ft)
- Population (2023): 435
  - Density: 35.4/km^{2} (91.7/sq mi)
- Time zone: UTC+01:00 (CET)
  - Summer (DST): UTC+02:00 (CEST)
- Postal code: 27340
- ^{1} French Land Register data, which excludes lakes, ponds, glaciers > 1 km^{2} (0.386 sq mi or 247 acres) and river estuaries.

Tostes (French pronunciation: [tot]) is a former commune in the Eure department in Normandy in north-western France. On 1 January 2017, it was merged into the new commune Terres de Bord.

== Personalities ==
Notable People

- Joseph Lion: published a study in the Almanac Normand-Percheron in 1908 on the use of potash fertilizer in Normandy

Fictional Characters

- Madame Bovary

Tostes is often accredited as the location of Charles and Emma Bovary's first home in Gustave Flaubert's novel; in actuality, it is the commune of Tôtes (postal code 76890) in the department of Seine-Maritime (previously Seine-Inférieure) that inspired the novelist. The confusion stems from the fact that in the 19th century the names of both locales were indiscriminately spelled as Tostes, Tôtes, or Totes. This information can be found in several sources, including the website of the University of Rouen, which has devoted much of the past two decades to numerous research studies on the genesis of Madame Bovary. On this map, the proximity of Totes to Yvetot leaves no doubt as to the location of the village where Charles Bovary was established as a health officer.

== See also ==
- Communes of the Eure department
