= Montaure =

- Part of Terres de Bord
- Location of Montaure
- Location within France Location within Normandy
- Coordinates: 49°14′10″N 1°05′16″E
- Country: France
- Region: Normandy
- Department: Eure
- Arrondissement: Les Andelys
- Canton: Pont-de-l'Arche
- Commune: Terres de Bord
- Area^{1}: 10.16 km^{2} (3.92 sq mi)
- Elevation: 141 m (463 ft)
- Highest elevation: 159 m (522 ft)
- Lowest elevation: 65 m (213 ft)
- Population (2022): 1,142
  - Density: 112.4/km^{2} (291.1/sq mi)
- Time zone: UTC+01:00 (CET)
  - Summer (DST): UTC+02:00 (CEST)
- Postal code: 27400
- ^{1} French Land Register data, which excludes lakes, ponds, glaciers > 1 km^{2} (0.386 sq mi or 247 acres) and river estuaries.

Montaure (French pronunciation: [mɔ̃tɔʁ]) is a former commune in the Eure department in Normandy in northern France. On 1 January 2017, it was merged into the new commune Terres de Bord.

== Population ==
Historical population

Year	Pop.	±% p.a.
1793	1,018	—
1800	1,035	+0.24%
1806	1,105	+1.10%
1821	1,275	+0.96%
1831	1,098	−1.48%
1836	1,081	−0.31%
1841	1,097	+0.29%
1846	1,120	+0.42%
1851	1,154	+0.60%
1856	1,160	+0.10%
1861	1,164	+0.07%
1866	1,203	+0.66%
1872	1,218	+0.21%
1876	1,230	+0.25%
1881	1,136	−1.58%
1886	1,137	+0.02%
1891	963	−3.27%

Year	Pop.	±% p.a.
1896	812	−3.35%
1901	737	−1.92%
1906	642	−2.72%
1911	589	−1.71%
1921	617	+0.47%
1926	665	+1.51%
1931	628	−1.14%
1936	586	−1.37%
1946	648	+1.01%
1954	717	+1.27%
1962	698	−0.34%
1968	677	−0.51%
1975	656	−0.45%
1982	777	+2.45%
1990	990	+3.07%
1999	1,073	+0.90%
2022	1,142	+0.27%

Source: EHESS and INSEE

== See also ==
- Communes of the Eure department
