= Surville, Eure =

Surville
- Commune
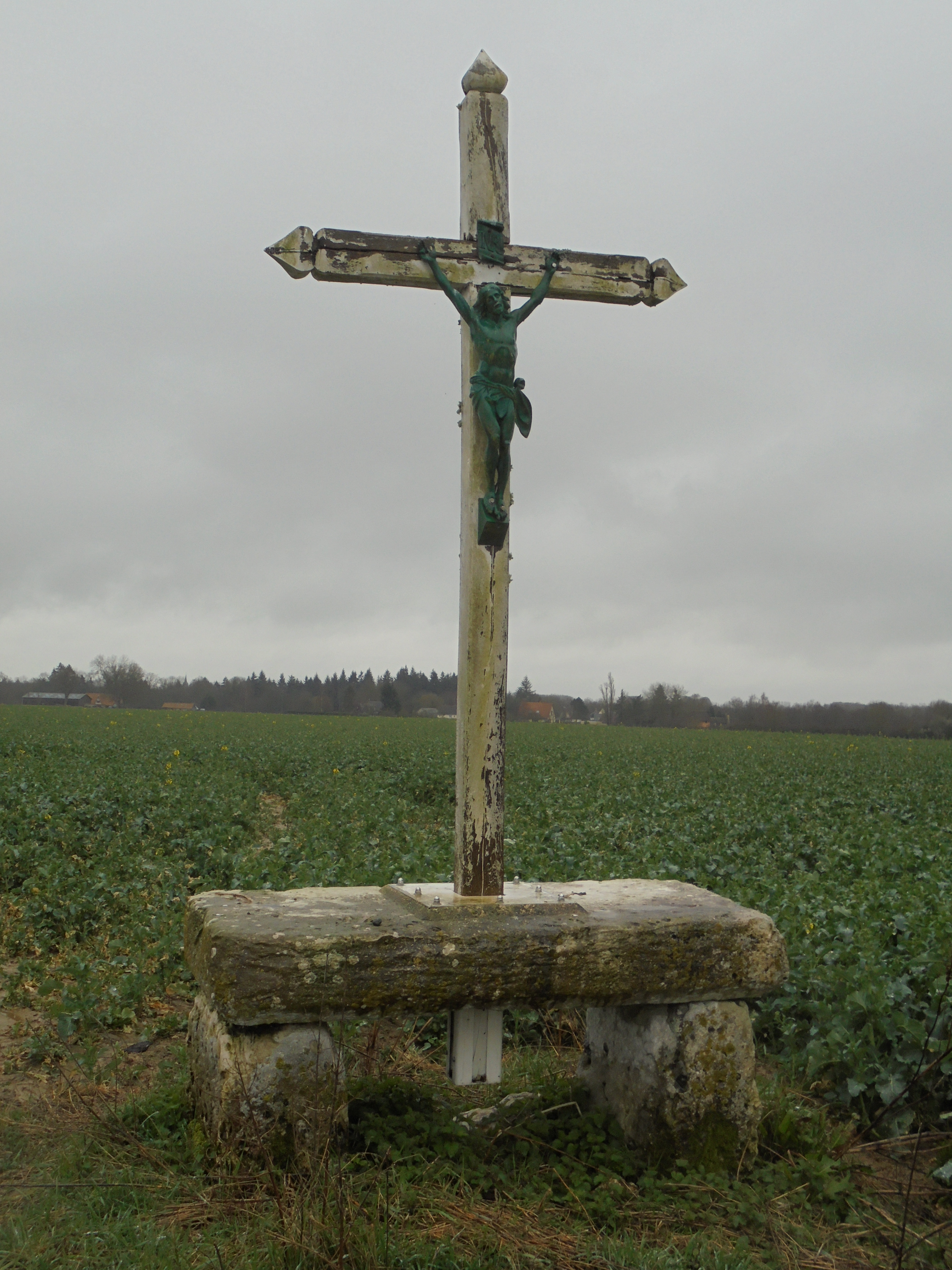
- The dolmen of Surville

- Coat of arms
- Location of Surville
- Location within France Location within Normandy
- Coordinates: 49°11′52″N 1°06′22″E
- Country: France
- Region: Normandy
- Department: Eure
- Arrondissement: Les Andelys
- Canton: Pont-de-l'Arche
- Intercommunality: CA Seine-Eure

Government
  - Mayor (2020–2026): Gildas Fort
- Area^{1}: 5.72 km^{2} (2.21 sq mi)
- Elevation: 152 m (499 ft)
- Highest elevation: 159 m (522 ft)
- Lowest elevation: 119 m (390 ft)
- Population (2023): 841
  - Density: 147/km^{2} (381/sq mi)
- Time zone: UTC+01:00 (CET)
  - Summer (DST): UTC+02:00 (CEST)
- INSEE/Postal code: 27624 /27400
- ^{1} French Land Register data, which excludes lakes, ponds, glaciers > 1 km^{2} (0.386 sq mi or 247 acres) and river estuaries.

Surville (French pronunciation: [syʁvil]) is a commune in the Eure department in Normandy in northern France.

== Population ==
Historical population
Year	Pop.	±% p.a.
1968	299	—
1975	406	+4.47%
1982	609	+5.96%
1990	727	+2.24%
1999	735	+0.12%
2007	858	+1.95%
2012	930	+1.62%
2017	904	−0.57%
2023	841	−1.20%
Source: INSEE

== See also ==
- Communes of the Eure department
