= Alizay =

- Commune
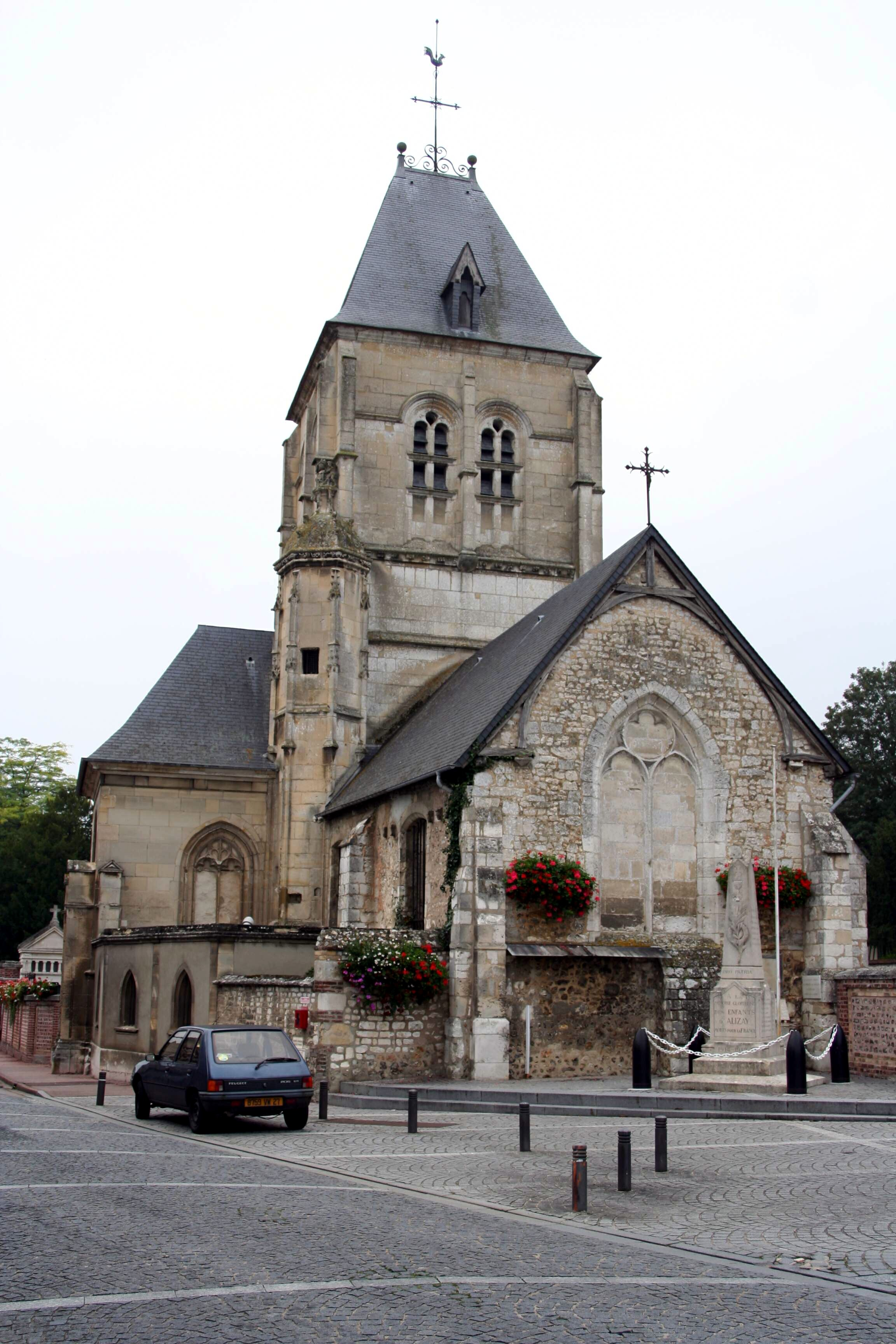
- The church in Alizay
- Location of Alizay
- Location within France Location within Normandy
- Coordinates: 49°19′18″N 1°10′36″E
- Country: France
- Region: Normandy
- Department: Eure
- Arrondissement: Les Andelys
- Canton: Pont-de-l'Arche
- Intercommunality: Seine-Eure

Government
  - Mayor (2020–2026): Arnaud Levitre
- Area^{1}: 8.62 km^{2} (3.33 sq mi)
- Elevation: 66 m (217 ft)
- Highest elevation: 135 m (443 ft)
- Lowest elevation: 4 m (13 ft)
- Population (2023): 1,567
  - Density: 182/km^{2} (471/sq mi)
- Time zone: UTC+01:00 (CET)
  - Summer (DST): UTC+02:00 (CEST)
- INSEE/Postal code: 27008 /27460
- ^{1} French Land Register data, which excludes lakes, ponds, glaciers > 1 km^{2} (0.386 sq mi or 247 acres) and river estuaries.

Alizay (French pronunciation: [alizɛ]) is a commune in the Eure department in Normandy in northern France.

== Population ==
Historical population
Year	Pop.	±% p.a.
1968	853	—
1975	865	+0.20%
1982	855	−0.17%
1990	1,090	+3.08%
1999	1,262	+1.64%
2007	1,361	+0.95%
2012	1,449	+1.26%
2017	1,544	+1.28%
2023	1,567	+0.25%
Source: INSEE

== See also ==
- Communes of the Eure department
