= Crasville, Eure =

Crasville
- Commune
- Location of Crasville
- Location within France Location within Normandy
- Coordinates: 49°12′31″N 1°04′28″E
- Country: France
- Region: Normandy
- Department: Eure
- Arrondissement: Les Andelys
- Canton: Pont-de-l'Arche
- Intercommunality: CA Seine-Eure

Government
  - Mayor (2020–2026): Jean-Michel Derrey-Hue
- Area^{1}: 2.45 km^{2} (0.95 sq mi)
- Elevation: 166 m (545 ft)
- Highest elevation: 162 m (531 ft)
- Lowest elevation: 148 m (486 ft)
- Population (2023): 121
  - Density: 49.4/km^{2} (128/sq mi)
- Time zone: UTC+01:00 (CET)
  - Summer (DST): UTC+02:00 (CEST)
- INSEE/Postal code: 27184 /27400
- ^{1} French Land Register data, which excludes lakes, ponds, glaciers > 1 km^{2} (0.386 sq mi or 247 acres) and river estuaries.

Crasville is a commune in the Eure department in northern France.

== Population ==
Historical population
Year	Pop.	±% p.a.
1968	140	—
1975	128	−1.27%
1982	103	−3.06%
1990	107	+0.48%
1999	123	+1.56%
2007	132	+0.89%
2012	125	−1.08%
2017	126	+0.16%
2023	121	−0.67%
Source: INSEE

== See also ==
- Communes of the Eure department
