= Canton of Louviers =

Coordinates: 49.21°N 1.17°E

The canton of Louviers is an administrative division of the Eure department, northern France. It was created at the French canton reorganisation which came into effect in March 2015. Its seat is in Louviers.

It consists of the following communes:

1. Andé
2. Heudebouville
3. Incarville
4. Louviers
5. Saint-Étienne-du-Vauvray
6. Saint-Pierre-du-Vauvray
7. Vironvay
