= Pîtres =

- Commune
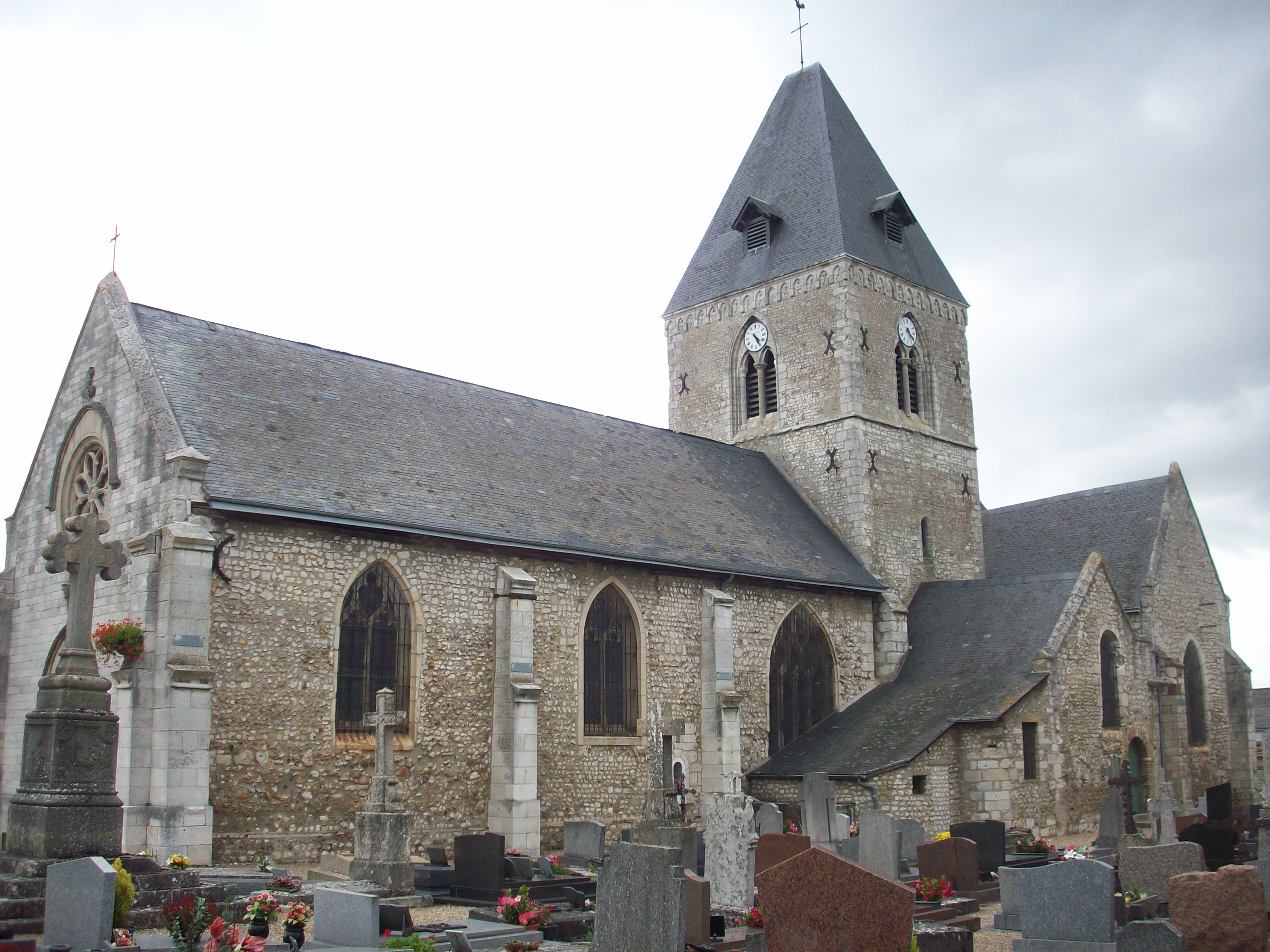
- The church in Pîtres

- Coat of arms
- Location of Pîtres
- Location within France Location within Normandy
- Coordinates: 49°19′13″N 1°13′37″E
- Country: France
- Region: Normandy
- Department: Eure
- Arrondissement: Les Andelys
- Canton: Pont-de-l'Arche
- Intercommunality: CA Seine-Eure

Government
  - Mayor (2020–2026): Florence Lambert
- Area^{1}: 10.97 km^{2} (4.24 sq mi)
- Elevation: 14 m (46 ft)
- Highest elevation: 138 m (453 ft)
- Lowest elevation: 7 m (23 ft)
- Population (2023): 2,589
  - Density: 236.0/km^{2} (611.3/sq mi)
- Time zone: UTC+01:00 (CET)
  - Summer (DST): UTC+02:00 (CEST)
- INSEE/Postal code: 27458 /27590
- ^{1} French Land Register data, which excludes lakes, ponds, glaciers > 1 km^{2} (0.386 sq mi or 247 acres) and river estuaries.

Pîtres (French pronunciation: [pitʁ]; medieval Pistres) is a commune in the Eure department in Normandy in north-western France. It lies on the Seine.

== History ==
Historically, it had a bridge to prevent Vikings from sailing up the river to Paris. It was here that King Charles the Bald promulgated the Edict of Pîtres in 864.

== Economy ==
The metal processing company Manoir Industries was founded in 1917.

== Population ==
Historical population

Year	Pop.	±% p.a.
1793	1,000	—
1800	1,053	+0.74%
1806	971	−1.34%
1821	963	−0.06%
1831	990	+0.28%
1836	1,045	+1.09%
1841	1,026	−0.37%
1846	1,028	+0.04%
1851	1,074	+0.88%
1856	980	−1.82%
1861	930	−1.04%
1866	914	−0.35%
1872	905	−0.16%
1876	888	−0.47%
1881	1,054	+3.49%
1886	939	−2.28%
1891	1,005	+1.37%
1896	972	−0.67%
1901	983	+0.23%

Year	Pop.	±% p.a.
1906	904	−1.66%
1911	900	−0.09%
1921	925	+0.27%
1926	937	+0.26%
1931	1,036	+2.03%
1936	982	−1.06%
1946	1,063	+0.80%
1954	1,045	−0.21%
1962	1,278	+2.55%
1968	1,848	+6.34%
1975	2,374	+3.64%
1982	2,312	−0.38%
1990	2,285	−0.15%
1999	2,290	+0.02%
2007	2,127	−0.92%
2012	2,428	+2.68%
2017	2,519	+0.74%
2023	2,589	+0.46%

Source: EHESS and INSEE (1968-2023)

== See also ==
- Communes of the Eure department
