= Le Manoir, Eure =

Le Manoir
- Commune
- Location of Le Manoir
- Location within France Location within Normandy
- Coordinates: 49°18′50″N 1°12′14″E
- Country: France
- Region: Normandy
- Department: Eure
- Arrondissement: Les Andelys
- Canton: Pont-de-l'Arche
- Intercommunality: CA Seine-Eure

Government
  - Mayor (2020–2026): Daniel Bayart
- Area^{1}: 2.39 km^{2} (0.92 sq mi)
- Elevation: 11 m (36 ft)
- Highest elevation: 120 m (390 ft)
- Lowest elevation: 4 m (13 ft)
- Population (2023): 1,272
  - Density: 532/km^{2} (1,380/sq mi)
- Time zone: UTC+01:00 (CET)
  - Summer (DST): UTC+02:00 (CEST)
- INSEE/Postal code: 27386 /27460
- ^{1} French Land Register data, which excludes lakes, ponds, glaciers > 1 km^{2} (0.386 sq mi or 247 acres) and river estuaries.

Le Manoir (French pronunciation: [lə manwaʁ]; also known as Le Manoir-sur-Seine) is a commune in the Eure department in Normandy in northern France.

== Population ==
Historical population
Year	Pop.	±% p.a.
1968	1,257	—
1975	1,329	+0.80%
1982	989	−4.13%
1990	881	−1.44%
1999	1,000	+1.42%
2007	1,226	+2.58%
2012	1,174	−0.86%
2017	1,278	+1.71%
2023	1,272	−0.08%
Source: INSEE

== Geography ==
The town is crossed by the railway line from Paris to Rouen by means of the Manoir viaduct.

The town is crossed by the Seine.

=== Climate ===
Communal climatic parameters over the period 1971-2000
Average annual temperature	11.2 °C
Number of days with a temperature below −5 °C	3 days
Number of days with temperature above 30 °C	3.2 days
Annual thermal amplitude	14.3 °C
Annual total precipitation	760 mm
Number of days of precipitation in January	12 days
Number of days of precipitation in July	8 days

== See also ==
- Communes of the Eure department
