= Terres de Bord =

- Commune
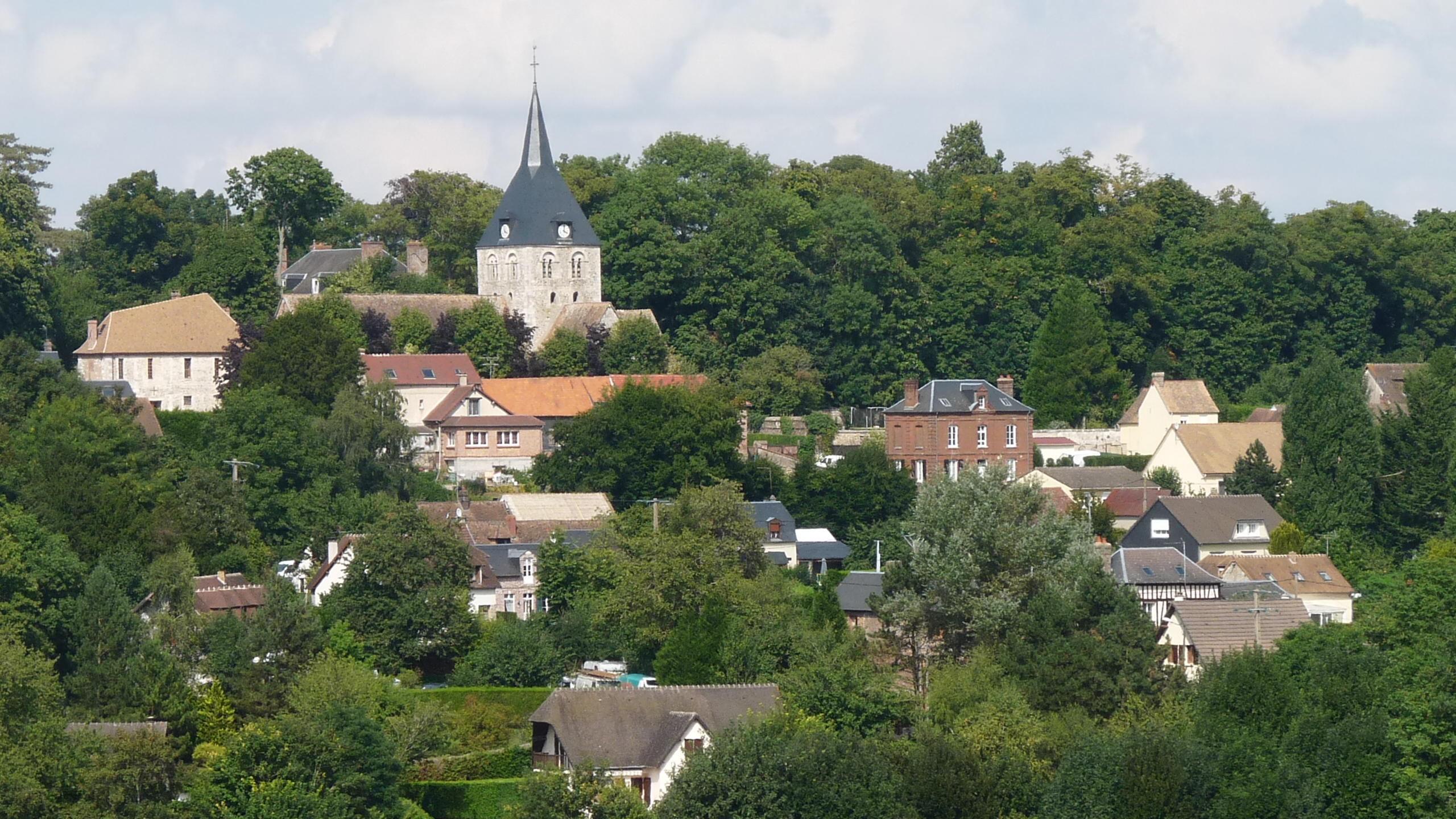
- A general view of Montaure
- Location of Terres de Bord
- Location within France Location within Normandy
- Coordinates: 49°14′10″N 1°05′17″E
- Country: France
- Region: Normandy
- Department: Eure
- Arrondissement: Les Andelys
- Canton: Pont-de-l'Arche
- Intercommunality: CA Seine-Eure

Government
  - Mayor (2020–2026): Patrice Philippe
- Area^{1}: 22.44 km^{2} (8.66 sq mi)
- Population (2023): 1,577
  - Density: 70.28/km^{2} (182.0/sq mi)
- Time zone: UTC+01:00 (CET)
  - Summer (DST): UTC+02:00 (CEST)
- INSEE/Postal code: 27412 /27340, 27400
- ^{1} French Land Register data, which excludes lakes, ponds, glaciers > 1 km^{2} (0.386 sq mi or 247 acres) and river estuaries.

Terres de Bord (French pronunciation: [tɛʁ də bɔʁ]) is a commune in the department of Eure, northern France. The municipality was established on 1 January 2017 by merger of the former communes of Montaure (the seat) and Tostes.

== See also ==
- Communes of the Eure department
