= Manoir Industries =

Company in Paris, France

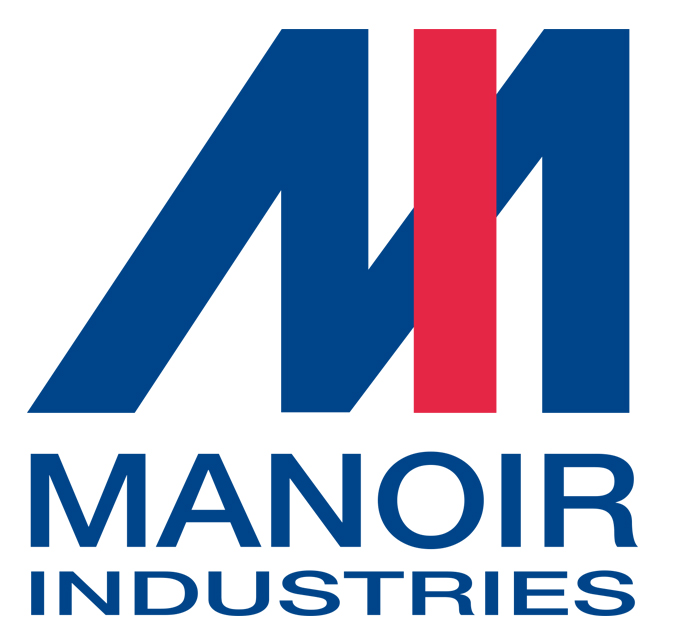
- Type: SAS
- Founded: 1917
- Headquarters: Paris, France,
- Products: Metal processing for petrochemical, nuclear, oil&gas, civil engineering, defense, construction, aerospace markets
- Revenue: €180 million (2014) (51% export)
- Number of employees: 1100
- Subsidiaries: Manoir Pîtres, Manoir Bouzonville, Manoir Engrenages (France), Hi-Tech Fabrication (UK), Kartik Steels (India), Yantai Manoir (China)

Manoir Industries is a global metal processing company mainly focusing on casting and forging components in petrochemical, nuclear, oil and gas, civil engineering, energy, defense, heavy weight trucks, tractors and aerospace markets. Manoir Industries employs 1,400 workers in 7 manufacturing locations in France, United Kingdom, India and China.

== History ==
Manoir Industries was established in 1917 in the commune of Pîtres in northwestern France, situated between the towns of Pîtres and Le Manoir, from which it derives its trade name. Over time, Manoir expanded its operations through successive acquisitions evolving into the Manoir Industries group. From 1917 to 1995, Manoir Industries acquired forging plants, including Bouzonville, as well as Manoir Custines and Saint-Brieuc's foundry, specializing in wearing parts. In 1994, Manoir initiated its global presence with a joint venture in China, later becoming Yantai Manoir in 2006. Subsequently, in 2008, Hi-Tech Fabrication, a welding company based in the United Kingdom, joined the group. Additionally, in 2010, Kartik Steels became part of Manoir, specializing in tube supports for petrochemical furnaces and operating as a foundry in Chennai, India.

== Markets ==
- Aerospace: forged components certified by helicopter companies and components for landing gear.
- Civil engineering: forged components for excavators, loaders and off-highway trucks.
- Mining components: forged components for dump trucks, roof support and fly bars.
- Nuclear: cast components as elbows, pump and valve bodies, tubes, pipes composed of loops for the primary circuit and forging parts such as tubes, valve bodies, manway pads, heat exchanger, feed water nozzle and other various components.
- Oil and Gas: forged and cast subsea and offshore components for conventional and unconventional (shale) oil and gas extraction.
- Petrochemical: manufacturing cast and centrifuged tubes to equip cracking (ethylene) and reforming (ammonia, methanol, hydrogen) furnaces.
- Steel industry: radiants and tubes.
- Transport: forged components for professional heavy trucks and the railway market.

== Manufacturing process ==
In forging or casting processes, small- and mid-size batches of various morphologies are manufactured in a large range of alloys and are undergo controls meeting customers quality requirements:

- Dye penetrant inspection
- Magnetic particle inspection
- Ultrasonic examination
- Dimensional controls...

The Petrochemical and Nuclear BU with the Pîtres, Burton-on-Trent, Yantai and Chennai plants offer components to withstand high temperatures. The Excellence center, based in Pîtres, guarantees the process and quality for Manoir's Petrochemical plants. The Manoir Forging Solutions with the Bouzonville forging plant and Manoir Engrenages provide all the closed-die, extrusion, gear grinding and cutting, machining and control processes for parts operating under severe conditions (nuclear, defense, oil & gas, mine, civil engineering, transport (heavy weight trucks and railways components), tractors and aerospace).
