= Edgar Raoul-Duval =

French magistrate and politician

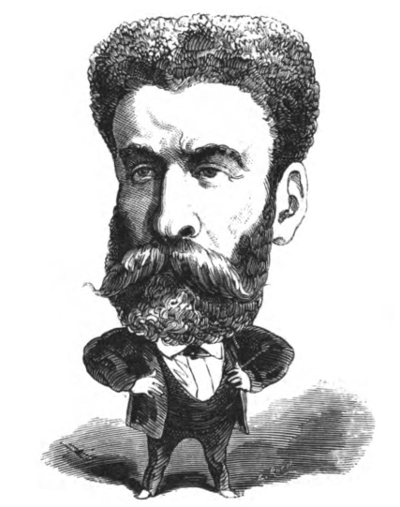
- Edgar Raoul-Duval by Georges Lafosse^{(fr)} from Le Trombinoscope (1872)

Representative of Seine-Inférieure
- In office 2 July 1871 – 7 March 1876

Deputy of Eure
- In office 20 February 1876 – 25 June 1877

Deputy of Eure
- In office 25 May 1884 – 10 February 1887

Personal details
- Born: 9 April 1832 Laon, Aisne, France
- Died: 10 February 1887 (aged 54) Monte Carlo, Monaco
- Occupation: Magistrate and politician

Edgar Raoul-Duval (9 April 1832 – 10 February 1887) was a French magistrate and politician who was Representative of Seine-Inférieure and then twice Deputy of Eure. He had right-wing views, and for most of his career he was a Bonapartist. He was a passionate orator, but somewhat inconsistent in his politics.

== Early years ==
Edgar Raoul Raoul-Duval was born on 9 April 1832 in Laon, Aisne. His father was Charles-Edmond Raoul-Duval (1807–93), a senator from 1876 to 1879. His father's surname was originally Duval, later changed to Raoul-Duval. His mother was Octavie Say (1804–65). She was the daughter of the economist Jean-Baptiste Say, and he was the cousin of Léon Say. He was a Protestant. His father and grandfather were both magistrates.

Raoul-Duval completed his law studies and in 1853 was appointed a substitute magistrate in Nantes at a very early age.On 8 January 1857, at Le Havre, he married Catherine Foerster (1834–1922). Their children were Marianne (1857–1940), Valentine (1860–1932), Edmond (1862–1932), and André (1870–1927). Edgar Raoul-Duval was in turn advocate-general at Angers, at Bordeaux, and from 1866 to 1870 at Rouen. He resigned on 4 September 1870 to register at the bar in Rouen as a prelude to entering militant politics.

== Political career ==
Raoul-Duval ran unsuccessfully for election to the legislature on 8 February 1871. He was elected later that year as conservative candidate in a by-election for Seine-Inférieure, where there were four vacant seats. He was a representative in the National Assembly for Seine-Inférieure from 2 July 1871 to 7 March 1876, and sat with the Union des Droites parliamentary group. He later joined the Appel au peuple group.

Raoul-Duval was soon one of the most active deputies of the conservative majority and one of its favorite speakers. He adopted Montesquieu's definition, "Freedom is the right to do anything the law does not prohibit." Raoul-Duval was rather inconsistent in his politics. A critic wrote of him, "M. Raoul Duval has plenty of entrain, of élan, of fire, of repartee, but he lacks the power of continued pursuance of one subject. ... He begins with a good and substantial address; he finishes with rolling fire of passionate responses to attacks hurled at him." Raoul-Duval was responsible for forcing the retirement from office of the Minister of the Interior, Victor Lefranc. He did not succeed in an attack on the treaty Adolphe Thiers had made with Germany after the Franco-Prussian War.

In 1872 Raoul-Duval intervened in several important debates. On economic questions Raoul Duval always defended the principles of free trade. He opposed the first constitutional laws and the "great council" proposed by Albert de Broglie, and also fought the proposal to extend the powers of Marshal MacMahon for seven years. He once said that any person who ventured to hint at dissolution was fit to be classed with Communists. However, several times between 1873 and 1875, when he sat with the Bonapartist group, he called for the dissolution of the Chamber. He demanded a plebiscite to sanction the constitution, and voted against the constitutional laws on 25 February 1875.

In the 1876 legislative elections Raoul-Duval ran both in the 8th arrondissement of Paris and in the Louviers district of Eure. He failed in Paris but was elected in the second round in Louviers. He rejoined the Bonapartist group. He was rapporteur of the budget of the navy and colonies for 1877, and intervened several times in the budget discussions. After the 16 May 1877 crisis he was one of 11 deputies who abstained from the vote of confidence requested by the Broglie ministry. He held office until 25 June 1877. In the elections of 14 October 1877 after the dissolution of the House he was defeated in his attempt to be reelected in Louviers. He tried again on 21 August 1881, but was again defeated.

Raoul-Duval won in a by-election on 25 May 1884 in the Bernay district of Eure to replace Eugène Janvier de La Motte^{(fr)}, who had died. On 4 October 1885 he was elected on the conservative list of the Eure department. He broke with the Bonapartists. In mid-1886 he proposed to Lucien Millevoye that a broad conservative coalition should be formed that would include conservative republicans and Protestants. The idea was discussed vaguely by the conservatives but did not have much effect. Most monarchists were not interested apart from a small clique of business-related northern deputies. In 1886 Raoul-Duval was a member of the Central Committee of the newly founded French Association for the Propagation of Volapük. The association was authorized on 8 April 1886 as a union of French enthusiasts of the Volapük constructed language.

Due to poor health Raoul-Duval went to Monte Carlo in December 1886, where he died of a chill on 10 February 1887 at the age of 54. A bronze statue of Edgar Raoul-Duval was erected in 1890 in Notre-Dame-du-Vaudreuil, Eure.

== Publications ==
Numerous reports, proposals and speeches by Raoul-Duval were published. A sample:

- Edgard-Raoul Duval (1864), Cour impériale d'Angers. Discours prononcé par M. l'avocat général E. Raoul Duval à l'audience solennelle de rentrée du 3 novembre 1864, Angers: impr. de Lainé frères / France. Cour d'appel., p. 50
- Edgard-Raoul Duval (1874), Assemblée nationale. Discours de M. Raoul Duval, député de la Seine-Inférieure, Saint-Germain: France. Assemblée nationale, p. 140
- Edgard-Raoul Duval (1875), Discours prononcé le samedi 8 mai 1875, dans une réunion privée à Belleville, Paris: Lachaud et Cie, p. 45
- Edgard-Raoul Duval (1876), Discours de M. Raoul Duval, député à l'Assemblée nationale, Paris: impr. de A. Dutemple / France. Assemblée nationale, p. 208
- Edgard-Raoul Duval (1876), Proposition de loi sur les établissements de prêts sur nantissement ou monts-de-piété, présentée par M. Raoul Duval,... [31 mars 1876.], Versailles: impr. de Cerf et fils, p. 53
- Edgard-Raoul Duval (1876), Rapport... Budget des dépenses de l'exercice 1877; ministère de la Marine et des colonies, Versailles: impr. de Cerf et fils, p. 55
- Edgard-Raoul Duval (1877), Discours de M. Raoul Duval, député de l'arrondissement de Louviers. Sessions législatives 1876–1877, Paris: France. Chambre des députés, p. 72
- Edgard-Raoul Duval; Georges Lachaud (1880), Le Parti national, discours, Paris: V. Daireaux, p. 59
- Edgard-Raoul Duval (1885), Société amicale des anciens élèves des Frères de Bernay. Le Drapeau (conférence faite par M. Raoul Duval,... et compte rendu de l'assemblée générale du 12 avril 1885), Évreux: impr. de C. Hérissey, p. 50

== Sources ==
- Edgar, Raoul Raoul-Duval (in French), Assemblée nationale
- Edgard-Raoul Duval (1832–1887) – Auteur du texte (in French), BnF: Bibliotheque nationale de France
- Fuller, Robert Lynn (2012-04-19), The Origins of the French Nationalist Movement, 1886–1914, McFarland, ISBN 978-0-7864-9025-7
- King, Edward (1876), French Political Leaders, G. P. Putnam's sons
- "Members du Comité Central" (PDF), Le Volapük (in French), Association Français pour la propagation du Volapük, archived from the original (PDF) on 2017-08-11
- Perchet, Dominique (22 August 2015), "Monument à Edgar Raoul-Duval – Notre-Dame-du-Vaudreuil (fondu)", e-monumen.net (in French)
- Pierfit, Edgar Raoul RAOUL-DUVAL (in French)
- "RAOUL DUVAL (EDGARD)", Le Trombinoscope (in French), 1872
- Robert, Adolphe; Cougny, Gaston (1889–1891), "RAOUL-DUVAL (EDGAR-RAOUL)", in Edgar Bourloton (ed.), Dictionnaire des Parlementaires français (1789–1889) (in French)
