= Heudebouville =

- Commune
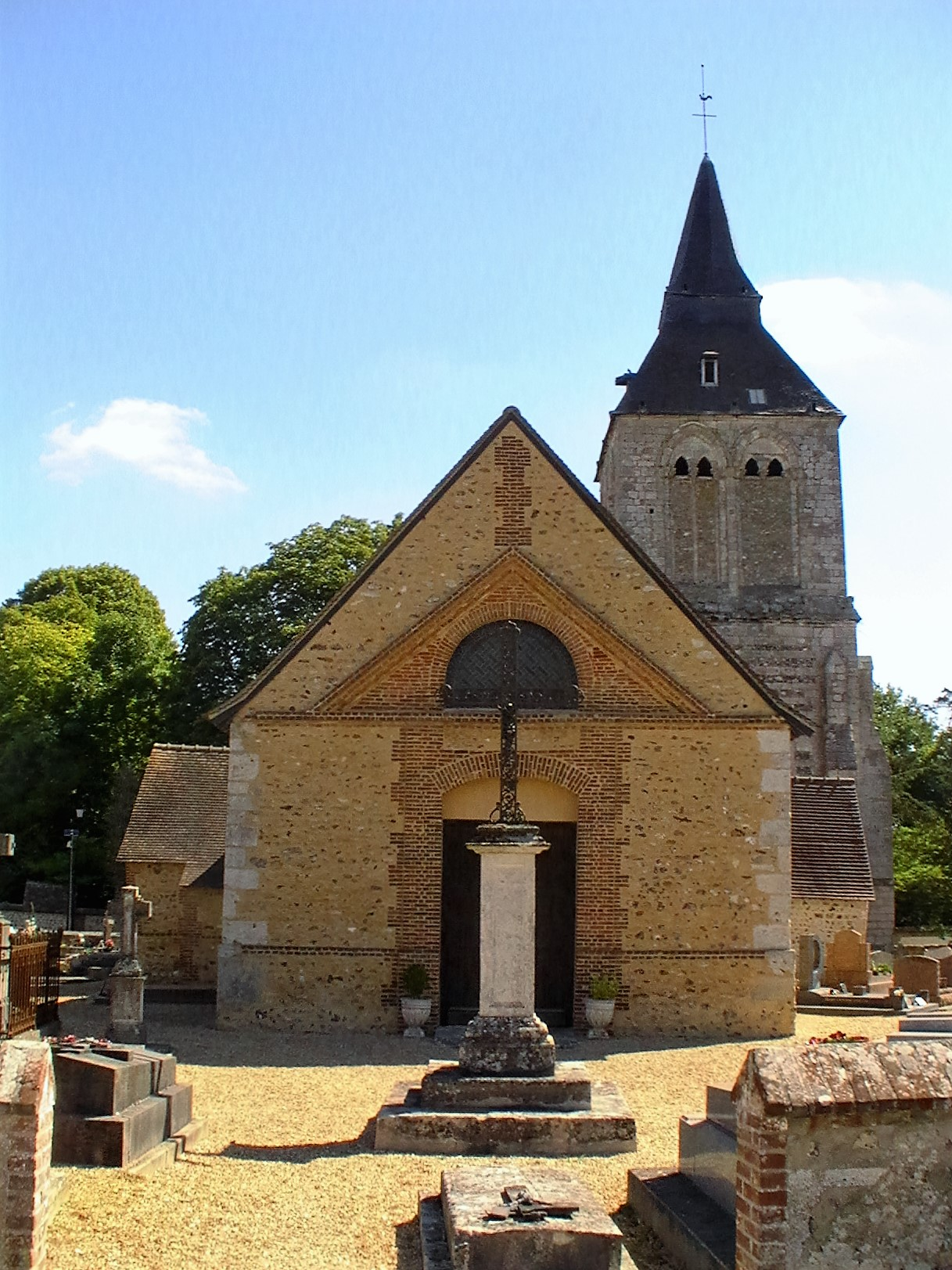
- The church of Saint-Valérien in Heudebouville
- Location of Heudebouville
- Location within France Location within Normandy
- Coordinates: 49°11′40″N 1°14′24″E
- Country: France
- Region: Normandy
- Department: Eure
- Arrondissement: Les Andelys
- Canton: Louviers
- Intercommunality: CA Seine-Eure

Government
  - Mayor (2020–2026): Comlan Zoutu
- Area^{1}: 9.28 km^{2} (3.58 sq mi)
- Elevation: 130 m (430 ft)
- Highest elevation: 151 m (495 ft)
- Lowest elevation: 8 m (26 ft)
- Population (2023): 821
  - Density: 88.5/km^{2} (229/sq mi)
- Time zone: UTC+01:00 (CET)
  - Summer (DST): UTC+02:00 (CEST)
- INSEE/Postal code: 27332 /27400
- ^{1} French Land Register data, which excludes lakes, ponds, glaciers > 1 km^{2} (0.386 sq mi or 247 acres) and river estuaries.

Heudebouville (French pronunciation: [ødbuvil]) is a commune in the Eure department in northern France.

== Population ==
Historical population
| Year | Pop. | ±% p.a. |
|---|---|---|
| 1968 | 383 | — |
| 1975 | 402 | +0.69% |
| 1982 | 557 | +4.77% |
| 1990 | 632 | +1.59% |
| 1999 | 709 | +1.29% |
| 2007 | 782 | +1.23% |
| 2012 | 802 | +0.51% |
| 2017 | 788 | −0.35% |
| 2023 | 821 | +0.69% |
Source: INSEE

== See also ==
- Communes of the Eure department
