= Igoville =

- Commune
- Coat of arms
- Location of Igoville
- Location within France Location within Normandy
- Coordinates: 49°19′13″N 1°09′01″E
- Country: France
- Region: Normandy
- Department: Eure
- Arrondissement: Les Andelys
- Canton: Pont-de-l'Arche
- Intercommunality: CA Seine-Eure

Government
  - Mayor (2024–2026): Gwenaël Jahier
- Area^{1}: 5.61 km^{2} (2.17 sq mi)
- Elevation: 14 m (46 ft)
- Highest elevation: 97 m (318 ft)
- Lowest elevation: 6 m (20 ft)
- Population (2023): 1,689
  - Density: 301/km^{2} (780/sq mi)
- Time zone: UTC+01:00 (CET)
  - Summer (DST): UTC+02:00 (CEST)
- INSEE/Postal code: 27348 /27460
- ^{1} French Land Register data, which excludes lakes, ponds, glaciers > 1 km^{2} (0.386 sq mi or 247 acres) and river estuaries.

Igoville (French pronunciation: [iɡɔvil]) is a commune in the Eure department in northern France.

== Population ==
Historical population
Year	Pop.	±% p.a.
1968	850	—
1975	889	+0.64%
1982	1,107	+3.18%
1990	1,312	+2.15%
1999	1,474	+1.30%
2007	1,484	+0.08%
2012	1,610	+1.64%
2017	1,746	+1.64%
2023	1,689	−0.55%
Source: INSEE

== See also ==
- Communes of the Eure department
