= Connelles =

- Commune
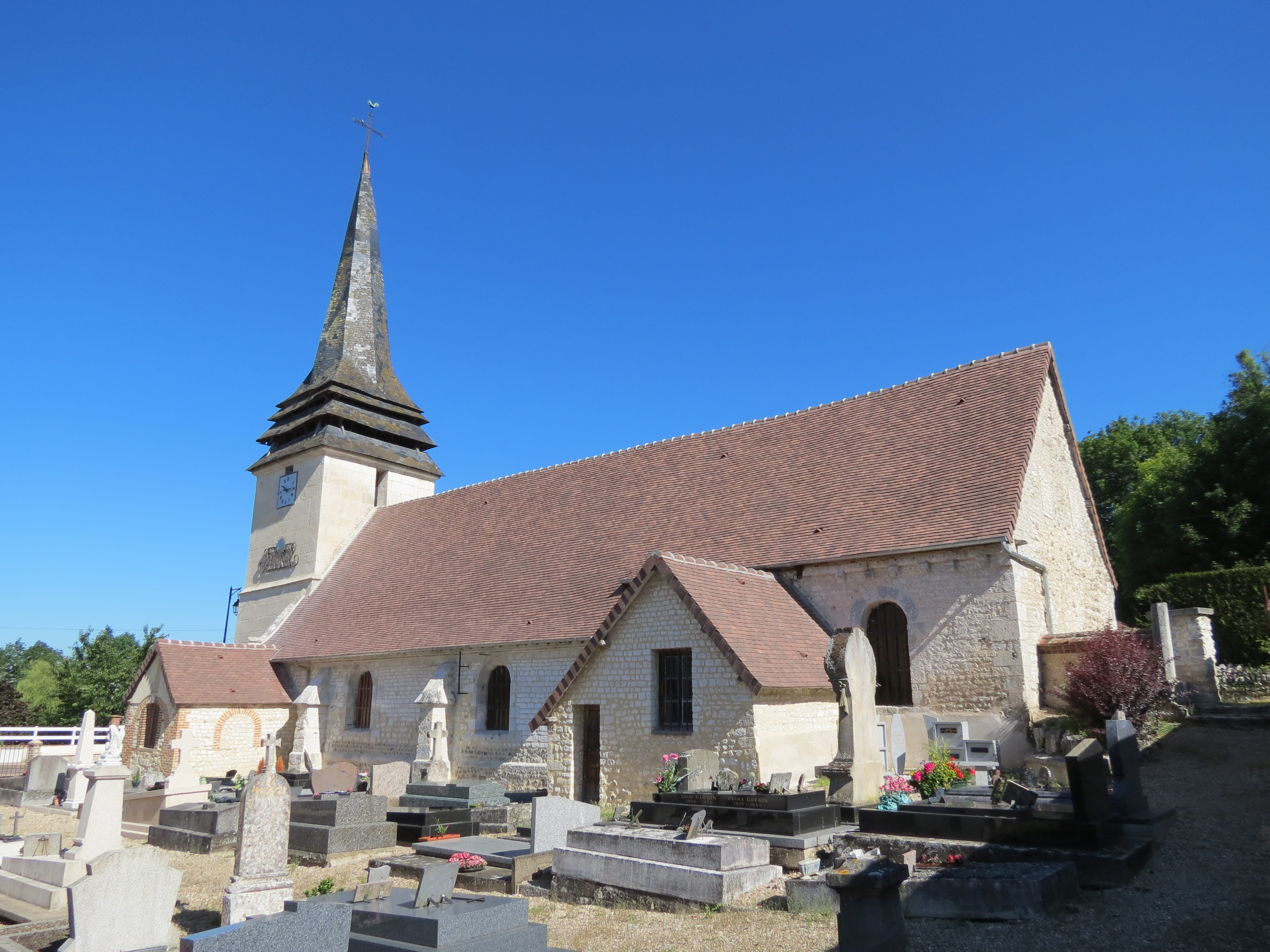
- Church Saint-Vaast

- Coat of arms
- Location of Connelles
- Location within France Location within Normandy
- Coordinates: 49°15′25″N 1°16′29″E
- Country: France
- Region: Normandy
- Department: Eure
- Arrondissement: Les Andelys
- Canton: Val-de-Reuil
- Intercommunality: CA Seine-Eure

Government
  - Mayor (2020–2026): Pierre Mazurier
- Area^{1}: 4.17 km^{2} (1.61 sq mi)
- Elevation: 28 m (92 ft)
- Highest elevation: 121 m (397 ft)
- Lowest elevation: 8 m (26 ft)
- Population (2023): 170
  - Density: 41/km^{2} (110/sq mi)
- Time zone: UTC+01:00 (CET)
  - Summer (DST): UTC+02:00 (CEST)
- INSEE/Postal code: 27168 /27430
- ^{1} French Land Register data, which excludes lakes, ponds, glaciers > 1 km^{2} (0.386 sq mi or 247 acres) and river estuaries.

Connelles (French pronunciation: [kɔnɛl]) is a commune in the Eure department in Normandy, northwestern France.

== Population ==
Historical population
Year	Pop.	±% p.a.
1968	104	—
1975	103	−0.14%
1982	139	+4.38%
1990	154	+1.29%
1999	188	+2.24%
2007	203	+0.96%
2012	198	−0.50%
2017	189	−0.93%
2023	170	−1.75%
Source: INSEE

== See also ==
- Communes of the Eure department
