= Surtauville =

- Commune
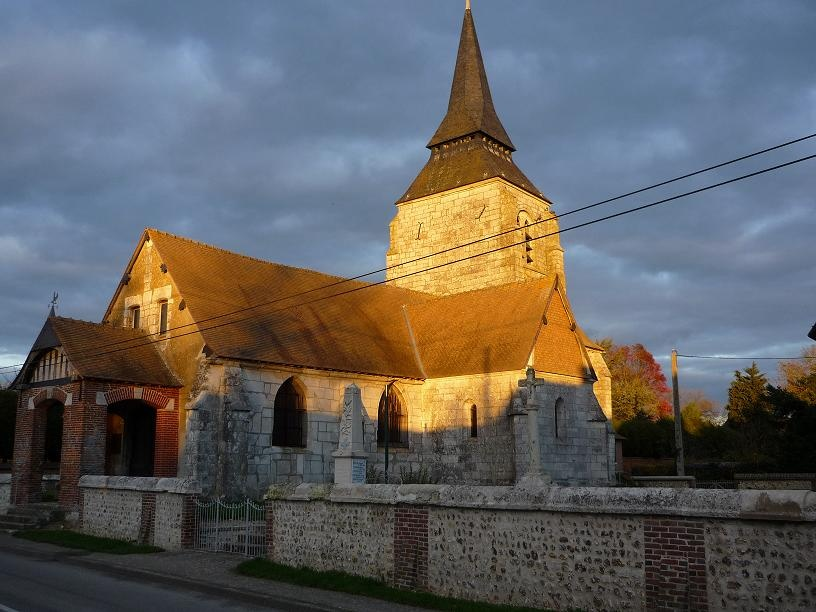
- The church in Surtauville
- Location of Surtauville
- Location within France Location within Normandy
- Coordinates: 49°12′25″N 1°03′21″E
- Country: France
- Region: Normandy
- Department: Eure
- Arrondissement: Les Andelys
- Canton: Pont-de-l'Arche
- Intercommunality: CA Seine-Eure

Government
  - Mayor (2020–2026): Hervé Picard
- Area^{1}: 4.42 km^{2} (1.71 sq mi)
- Elevation: 164 m (538 ft)
- Highest elevation: 163 m (535 ft)
- Lowest elevation: 146 m (479 ft)
- Population (2023): 489
  - Density: 111/km^{2} (287/sq mi)
- Time zone: UTC+01:00 (CET)
  - Summer (DST): UTC+02:00 (CEST)
- INSEE/Postal code: 27623 /27400
- ^{1} French Land Register data, which excludes lakes, ponds, glaciers > 1 km^{2} (0.386 sq mi or 247 acres) and river estuaries.

Surtauville (French pronunciation: [syʁtovil]) is a commune in the Eure department in Normandy in northern France.

== Population ==
Historical population
Year	Pop.	±% p.a.
1968	246	—
1975	308	+3.26%
1982	284	−1.15%
1990	334	+2.05%
1999	355	+0.68%
2007	400	+1.50%
2012	478	+3.63%
2017	486	+0.33%
2023	489	+0.10%
Source: INSEE

== See also ==
- Communes of the Eure department
