= Martot =

- Commune
- Coat of arms
- Location of Martot
- Location within France Location within Normandy
- Coordinates: 49°17′45″N 1°03′58″E
- Country: France
- Region: Normandy
- Department: Eure
- Arrondissement: Les Andelys
- Canton: Pont-de-l'Arche
- Intercommunality: CA Seine-Eure

Government
  - Mayor (2020–2026): François Charlier
- Area^{1}: 8.48 km^{2} (3.27 sq mi)
- Elevation: 34 m (112 ft)
- Highest elevation: 126 m (413 ft)
- Lowest elevation: 4 m (13 ft)
- Population (2023): 464
  - Density: 54.7/km^{2} (142/sq mi)
- Time zone: UTC+01:00 (CET)
  - Summer (DST): UTC+02:00 (CEST)
- INSEE/Postal code: 27394 /27340
- ^{1} French Land Register data, which excludes lakes, ponds, glaciers > 1 km^{2} (0.386 sq mi or 247 acres) and river estuaries.

Martot (French pronunciation: [maʁto]) is a commune in the Eure department in the Normandy region in northern France. It is situated at the confluence of the rivers Eure and Seine.

== Population ==
Historical population
Year	Pop.	±% p.a.
1968	270	—
1975	294	+1.22%
1982	508	+8.13%
1990	505	−0.07%
1999	435	−1.64%
2007	499	+1.73%
2012	587	+3.30%
2017	573	−0.48%
2023	464	−3.46%
Source: INSEE

== See also ==
- Communes of the Eure department
