= Le Mesnil-Jourdain =

- Commune
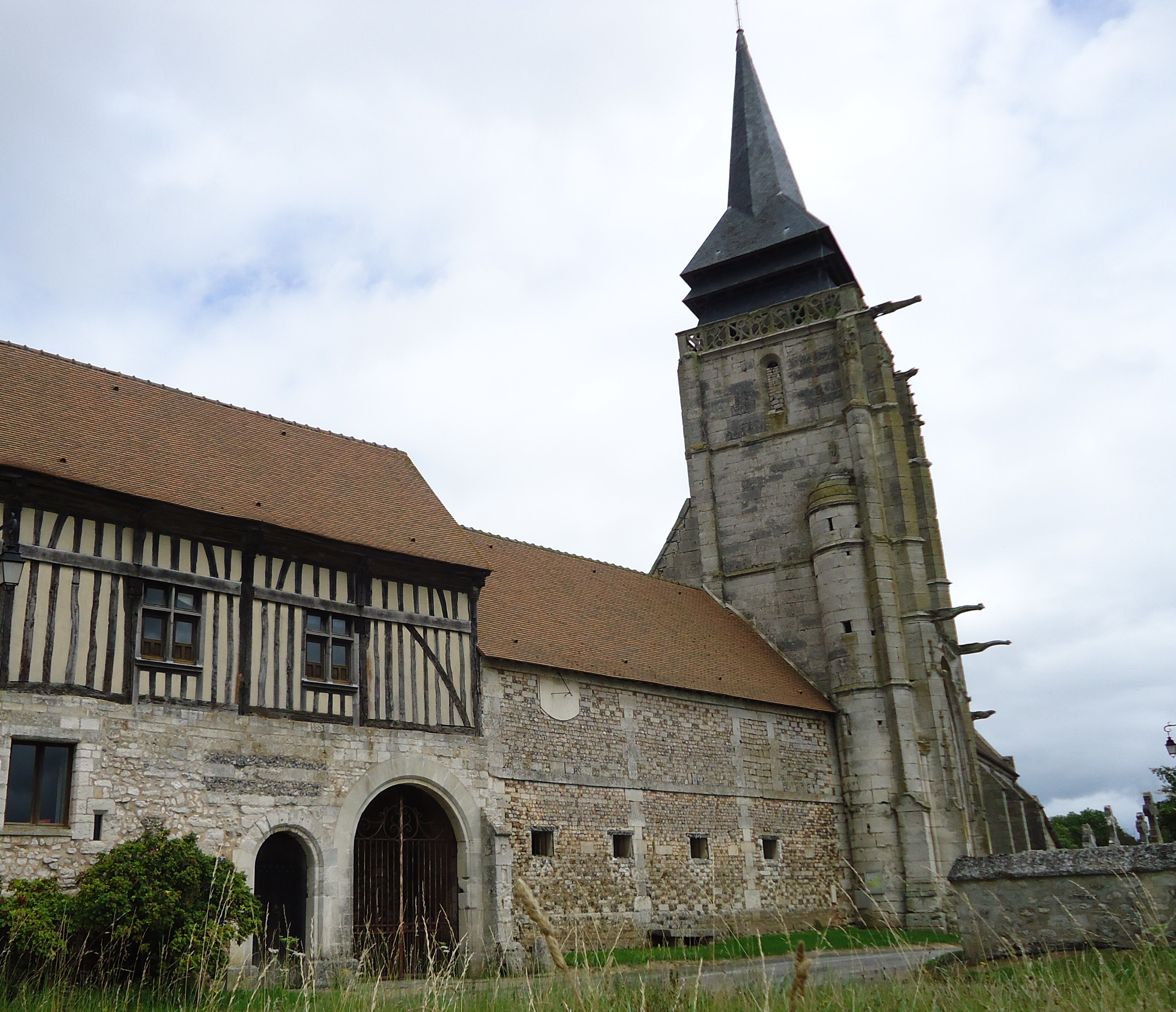
- The church and farm in Le Mesnil-Jourdain
- Location of Le Mesnil-Jourdain
- Location within France Location within Normandy
- Coordinates: 49°10′39″N 1°06′41″E
- Country: France
- Region: Normandy
- Department: Eure
- Arrondissement: Les Andelys
- Canton: Pont-de-l'Arche
- Intercommunality: CA Seine-Eure

Government
  - Mayor (2020–2026): Pierrick Gilles
- Area^{1}: 10.41 km^{2} (4.02 sq mi)
- Elevation: 142 m (466 ft)
- Highest elevation: 153 m (502 ft)
- Lowest elevation: 14 m (46 ft)
- Population (2023): 236
  - Density: 22.7/km^{2} (58.7/sq mi)
- Time zone: UTC+01:00 (CET)
  - Summer (DST): UTC+02:00 (CEST)
- INSEE/Postal code: 27403 /27400
- ^{1} French Land Register data, which excludes lakes, ponds, glaciers > 1 km^{2} (0.386 sq mi or 247 acres) and river estuaries.

Le Mesnil-Jourdain (French pronunciation: [lə mɛnil ʒuʁdɛ̃]) is a commune in the Eure department in Normandy in northern France.

== Population ==
Historical population
| Year | Pop. | ±% p.a. |
|---|---|---|
| 1968 | 171 | — |
| 1975 | 139 | −2.92% |
| 1982 | 213 | +6.29% |
| 1990 | 271 | +3.06% |
| 1999 | 252 | −0.80% |
| 2007 | 240 | −0.61% |
| 2012 | 231 | −0.76% |
| 2017 | 233 | +0.17% |
| 2023 | 236 | +0.21% |
Source: INSEE

== See also ==
- Communes of the Eure department
