= Criquebeuf-sur-Seine =

- Commune
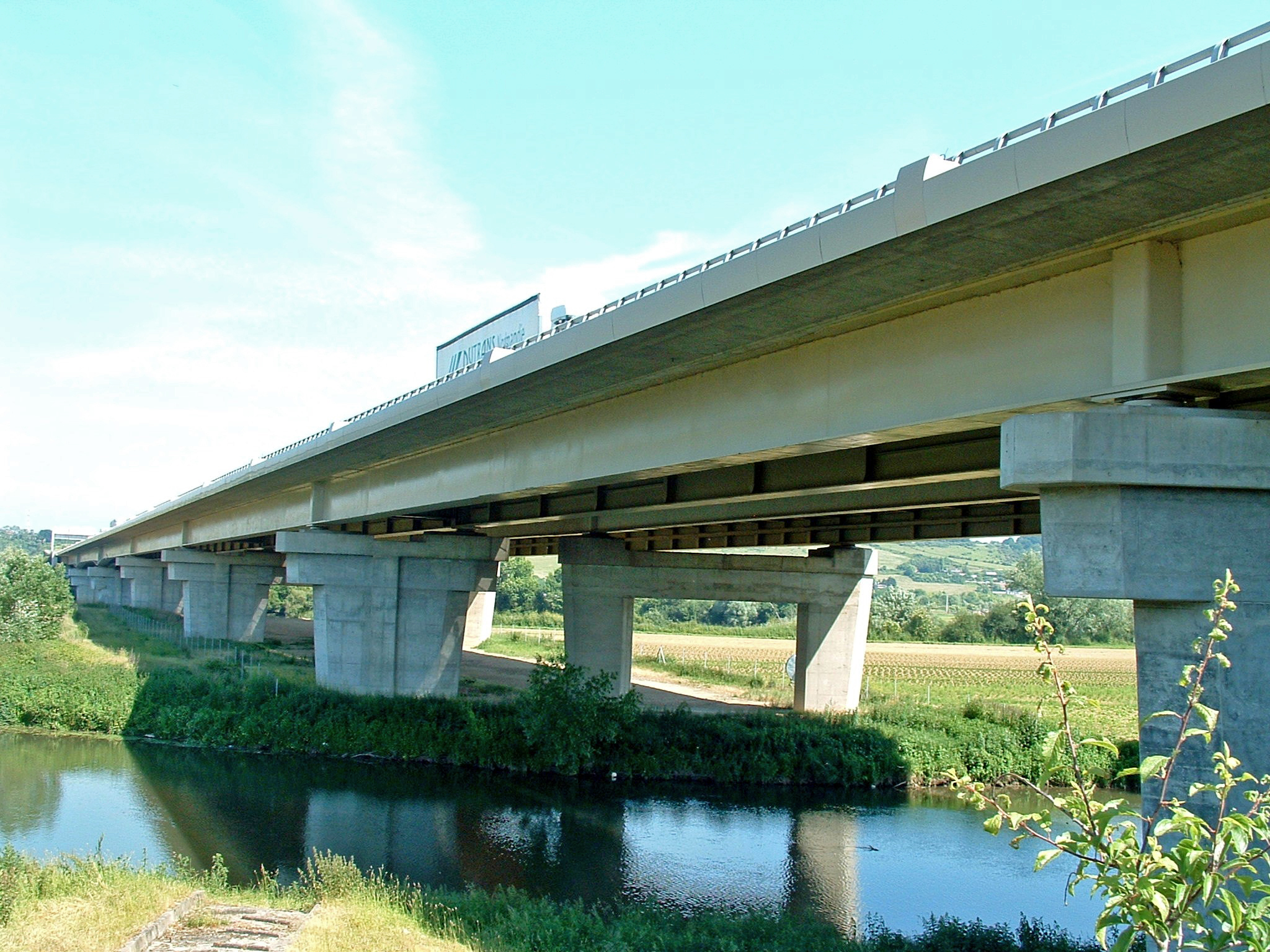
- The A13 Criquebeuf road bridge
- Location of Criquebeuf-sur-Seine
- Location within France Location within Normandy
- Coordinates: 49°18′23″N 1°05′54″E
- Country: France
- Region: Normandy
- Department: Eure
- Arrondissement: Les Andelys
- Canton: Pont-de-l'Arche
- Intercommunality: CA Seine-Eure

Government
  - Mayor (2020–2026): Jérémy Thirez
- Area^{1}: 14.74 km^{2} (5.69 sq mi)
- Elevation: 35 m (115 ft)
- Highest elevation: 124 m (407 ft)
- Lowest elevation: 3 m (9.8 ft)
- Population (2023): 1,549
  - Density: 105.1/km^{2} (272.2/sq mi)
- Time zone: UTC+01:00 (CET)
  - Summer (DST): UTC+02:00 (CEST)
- INSEE/Postal code: 27188 /27340
- ^{1} French Land Register data, which excludes lakes, ponds, glaciers > 1 km^{2} (0.386 sq mi or 247 acres) and river estuaries.

Criquebeuf-sur-Seine (French pronunciation: [kʁikbœf syʁ sɛn], literally Criquebeuf on Seine) is a commune in the Eure department in northern France.

== Population ==
Historical population
Year	Pop.	±% p.a.
1968	954	—
1975	956	+0.03%
1982	975	+0.28%
1990	970	−0.06%
1999	1,036	+0.73%
2007	1,135	+1.15%
2012	1,224	+1.52%
2017	1,449	+3.43%
2023	1,549	+1.12%
Source: INSEE

== See also ==
- Communes of the Eure department
