= La Vacherie =

- Commune
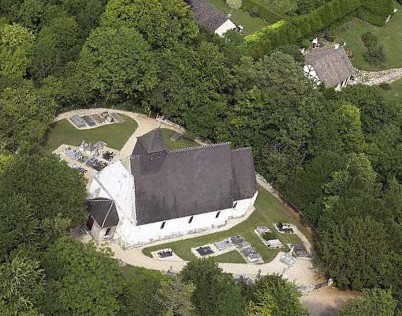
- The church in La Vacherie
- Location of La Vacherie
- Location within France Location within Normandy
- Coordinates: 49°07′37″N 1°08′41″E
- Country: France
- Region: Normandy
- Department: Eure
- Arrondissement: Les Andelys
- Canton: Pont-de-l'Arche
- Intercommunality: CA Seine-Eure

Government
  - Mayor (2020–2026): Jean-Claude Courant
- Area^{1}: 7.63 km^{2} (2.95 sq mi)
- Elevation: 33 m (108 ft)
- Highest elevation: 144 m (472 ft)
- Lowest elevation: 26 m (85 ft)
- Population (2023): 557
  - Density: 73.0/km^{2} (189/sq mi)
- Time zone: UTC+01:00 (CET)
  - Summer (DST): UTC+02:00 (CEST)
- INSEE/Postal code: 27666 /27400
- ^{1} French Land Register data, which excludes lakes, ponds, glaciers > 1 km^{2} (0.386 sq mi or 247 acres) and river estuaries.

La Vacherie (French pronunciation: [la vaʃʁi]) is a commune in the Eure department in Normandy in northern France.

== Population ==
Historical population
Year	Pop.	±% p.a.
1968	162	—
1975	176	+1.19%
1982	279	+6.80%
1990	423	+5.34%
1999	485	+1.53%
2007	531	+1.14%
2012	556	+0.92%
2017	568	+0.43%
2023	557	−0.33%
Source: INSEE

== See also ==
- Communes of the Eure department
