= Communauté d'agglomération Seine-Eure =

Seine-Eure
- Communauté d'agglomération
- Interactive map of Seine-Eure
- Coordinates: 49°13′N 01°10′E
- Country: France
- Region: Normandy
- Department: Eure
- No. of communes: {{{nbcomm}}}
- Established: 2019
- Area: 543.7 km^{2} (209.9 sq mi)
- Population (2017): 103,496
  - Density: 190.4/km^{2} (493.0/sq mi)
- Website: www.agglo-seine-eure.fr

Communauté d'agglomération Seine-Eure is an intercommunal structure, centred on the city of Louviers. It is located in the Eure department, in the Normandy region, northern France. It was created in September 2019. Its seat is in Louviers. Its population was 103,496 in 2017, of which 18,648 in Louviers proper.

== Composition ==
The communauté d'agglomération consists of the following 60 communes:

1. Acquigny
2. Ailly
3. Alizay
4. Amfreville-sous-les-Monts
5. Amfreville-sur-Iton
6. Andé
7. Autheuil-Authouillet
8. Le Bec-Thomas
9. Cailly-sur-Eure
10. Champenard
11. Clef-Vallée-d'Eure
12. Connelles
13. Courcelles-sur-Seine
14. Crasville
15. Criquebeuf-sur-Seine
16. Les Damps
17. Fontaine-Bellenger
18. Gaillon
19. La Harengère
20. La Haye-le-Comte
21. La Haye-Malherbe
22. Herqueville
23. Heudebouville
24. Heudreville-sur-Eure
25. Igoville
26. Incarville
27. Léry
28. Louviers
29. Mandeville
30. Le Manoir
31. Martot
32. Le Mesnil-Jourdain
33. Pinterville
34. Pîtres
35. Pont-de-l'Arche
36. Porte-de-Seine
37. Poses
38. Quatremare
39. Saint-Aubin-sur-Gaillon
40. Saint-Cyr-la-Campagne
41. Saint-Didier-des-Bois
42. Saint-Étienne-du-Vauvray
43. Saint-Étienne-sous-Bailleul
44. Saint-Germain-de-Pasquier
45. Saint-Julien-de-la-Liègue
46. Saint-Pierre-de-Bailleul
47. Saint-Pierre-du-Vauvray
48. Saint-Pierre-la-Garenne
49. La Saussaye
50. Surtauville
51. Surville
52. Terres de Bord
53. Les Trois Lacs
54. La Vacherie
55. Val-de-Reuil
56. Le Val-d'Hazey
57. Le Vaudreuil
58. Villers-sur-le-Roule
59. Vironvay
60. Vraiville
