= Canton of Val-de-Reuil =

Coordinates: 49.27°N 1.21°E

The canton of Val-de-Reuil is an administrative division of the Eure department, northern France. Its borders were modified at the French canton reorganisation which came into effect in March 2015. Its seat is in Val-de-Reuil.

It consists of the following communes:

1. Amfreville-sous-les-Monts
2. Connelles
3. Herqueville
4. Léry
5. Porte-de-Seine
6. Poses
7. Val-de-Reuil
8. Le Vaudreuil
