= Pinterville =

- Commune
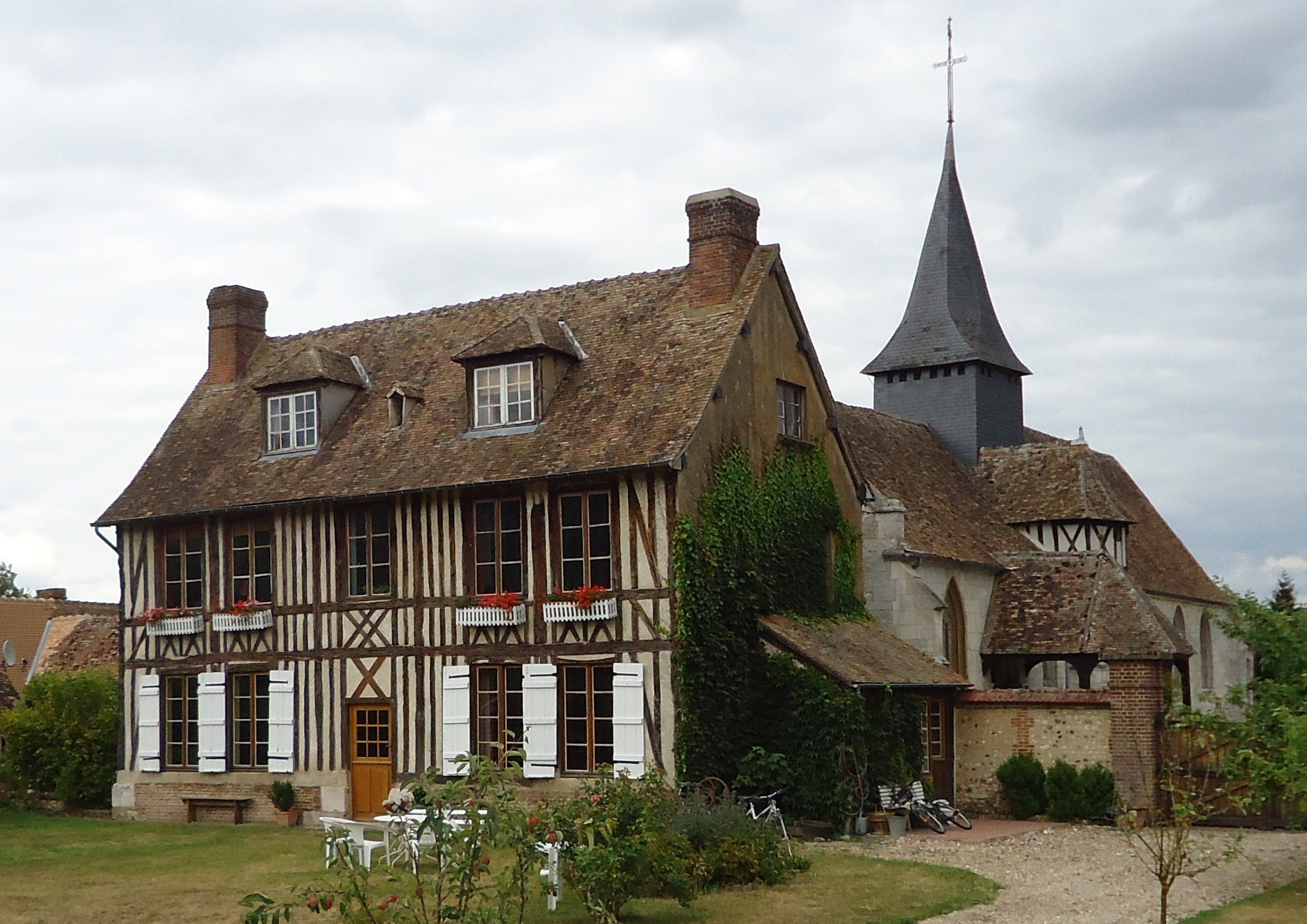
- The church and presbytery in Pinterville
- Location of Pinterville
- Location within France Location within Normandy
- Coordinates: 49°11′31″N 1°10′37″E
- Country: France
- Region: Normandy
- Department: Eure
- Arrondissement: Les Andelys
- Canton: Pont-de-l'Arche
- Intercommunality: CA Seine-Eure

Government
  - Mayor (2020–2026): Didier Dagomet
- Area^{1}: 5.93 km^{2} (2.29 sq mi)
- Elevation: 40 m (130 ft)
- Highest elevation: 129 m (423 ft)
- Lowest elevation: 12 m (39 ft)
- Population (2023): 813
  - Density: 137/km^{2} (355/sq mi)
- Time zone: UTC+01:00 (CET)
  - Summer (DST): UTC+02:00 (CEST)
- INSEE/Postal code: 27456 /27400
- ^{1} French Land Register data, which excludes lakes, ponds, glaciers > 1 km^{2} (0.386 sq mi or 247 acres) and river estuaries.

Pinterville (French pronunciation: [pɛ̃tɛʁvil]) is a commune in the Eure department in Normandy in northern France.

== Population ==
Historical population
Year	Pop.	±% p.a.
1968	419	—
1975	494	+2.38%
1982	516	+0.62%
1990	835	+6.20%
1999	757	−1.08%
2007	851	+1.47%
2012	750	−2.50%
2017	745	−0.13%
2023	813	+1.47%
Source: INSEE

== See also ==
- Communes of the Eure department
