= Amfreville-sur-Iton =

- Commune
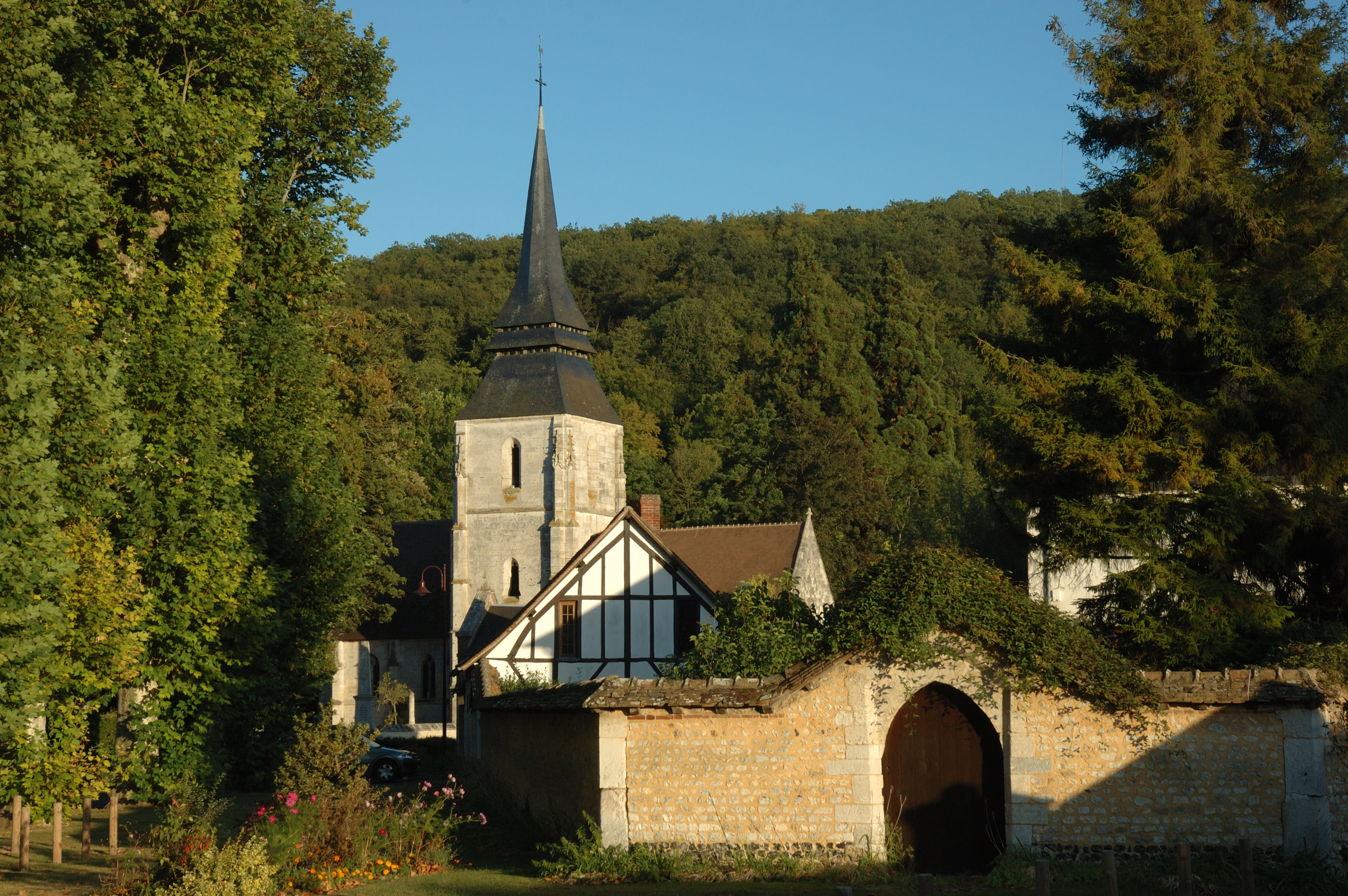
- The church in Amfreville-sur-Iton
- Location of Amfreville-sur-Iton
- Location within France Location within Normandy
- Coordinates: 49°08′59″N 1°09′17″E
- Country: France
- Region: Normandy
- Department: Eure
- Arrondissement: Les Andelys
- Canton: Pont-de-l'Arche
- Intercommunality: Seine-Eure

Government
  - Mayor (2020–2026): Marie-Joëlle Lenfant
- Area^{1}: 5.48 km^{2} (2.12 sq mi)
- Elevation: 23 m (75 ft)
- Highest elevation: 152 m (499 ft)
- Lowest elevation: 20 m (66 ft)
- Population (2023): 887
  - Density: 162/km^{2} (419/sq mi)
- Time zone: UTC+01:00 (CET)
  - Summer (DST): UTC+02:00 (CEST)
- INSEE/Postal code: 27014 /27400
- ^{1} French Land Register data, which excludes lakes, ponds, glaciers > 1 km^{2} (0.386 sq mi or 247 acres) and river estuaries.

Amfreville-sur-Iton (French pronunciation: [ɑ̃fʁəvil syʁ itɔ̃], literally Amfreville on Iton) is a commune in the Eure department in Normandy in northern France.

== Population ==
Historical population
Year	Pop.	±% p.a.
1968	367	—
1975	367	+0.00%
1982	489	+4.19%
1990	633	+3.28%
1999	716	+1.38%
2007	776	+1.01%
2012	771	−0.13%
2017	830	+1.49%
2023	887	+1.11%
Source: INSEE

== See also ==
- Communes of the Eure department
