= Vironvay =

- Commune
- Location of Vironvay
- Location within France Location within Normandy
- Coordinates: 49°12′25″N 1°13′13″E
- Country: France
- Region: Normandy
- Department: Eure
- Arrondissement: Les Andelys
- Canton: Louviers
- Intercommunality: CA Seine-Eure

Government
  - Mayor (2020–2026): Nadine Lefebvre
- Area^{1}: 3.9 km^{2} (1.5 sq mi)
- Elevation: 132 m (433 ft)
- Highest elevation: 138 m (453 ft)
- Lowest elevation: 8 m (26 ft)
- Population (2023): 334
  - Density: 86/km^{2} (220/sq mi)
- Time zone: UTC+01:00 (CET)
  - Summer (DST): UTC+02:00 (CEST)
- INSEE/Postal code: 27697 /27400
- ^{1} French Land Register data, which excludes lakes, ponds, glaciers > 1 km^{2} (0.386 sq mi or 247 acres) and river estuaries.

Vironvay (French pronunciation: [viʁɔ̃vɛ]) is a commune in the Eure department in Normandy in northern France.

== Population ==
Historical population
Year	Pop.	±% p.a.
1968	92	—
1975	145	+6.72%
1982	169	+2.21%
1990	276	+6.32%
1999	275	−0.04%
2007	305	+1.30%
2012	307	+0.13%
2017	332	+1.58%
2023	334	+0.10%
Source: INSEE

== See also ==
- Communes of the Eure department
