= Andé =

- Commune
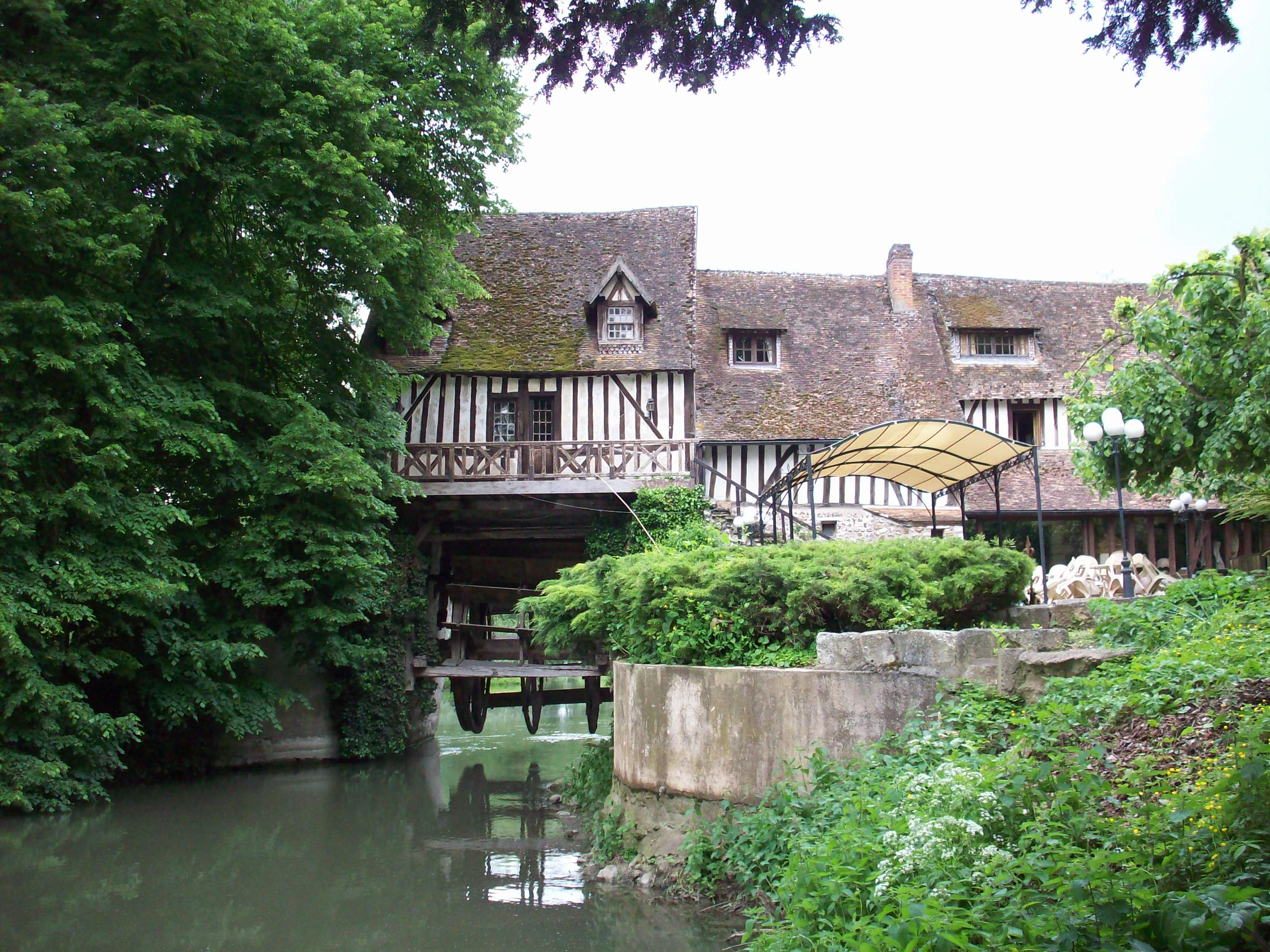
- Mill

- Coat of arms
- Location of Andé
- Location within France Location within Normandy
- Coordinates: 49°13′59″N 1°14′36″E
- Country: France
- Region: Normandy
- Department: Eure
- Arrondissement: Les Andelys
- Canton: Louviers
- Intercommunality: Seine-Eure

Government
  - Mayor (2020–2026): Jean-Marc Moglia
- Area^{1}: 5.31 km^{2} (2.05 sq mi)
- Elevation: 45 m (148 ft)
- Highest elevation: 48 m (157 ft)
- Lowest elevation: 7 m (23 ft)
- Population (2023): 1,343
  - Density: 253/km^{2} (655/sq mi)
- Time zone: UTC+01:00 (CET)
  - Summer (DST): UTC+02:00 (CEST)
- INSEE/Postal code: 27015 /27430
- ^{1} French Land Register data, which excludes lakes, ponds, glaciers > 1 km^{2} (0.386 sq mi or 247 acres) and river estuaries.

Andé (French pronunciation: [ɑ̃de]) is a commune in the Eure department and Normandy region of France.

== Population ==
Historical population
Year	Pop.	±% p.a.
1968	433	—
1975	599	+4.75%
1982	667	+1.55%
1990	966	+4.74%
1999	996	+0.34%
2007	1,050	+0.66%
2012	1,141	+1.68%
2017	1,288	+2.45%
2023	1,343	+0.70%
Source: INSEE

== See also ==
- Communes of the Eure department
