= Herqueville, Eure =

Herqueville
- Commune
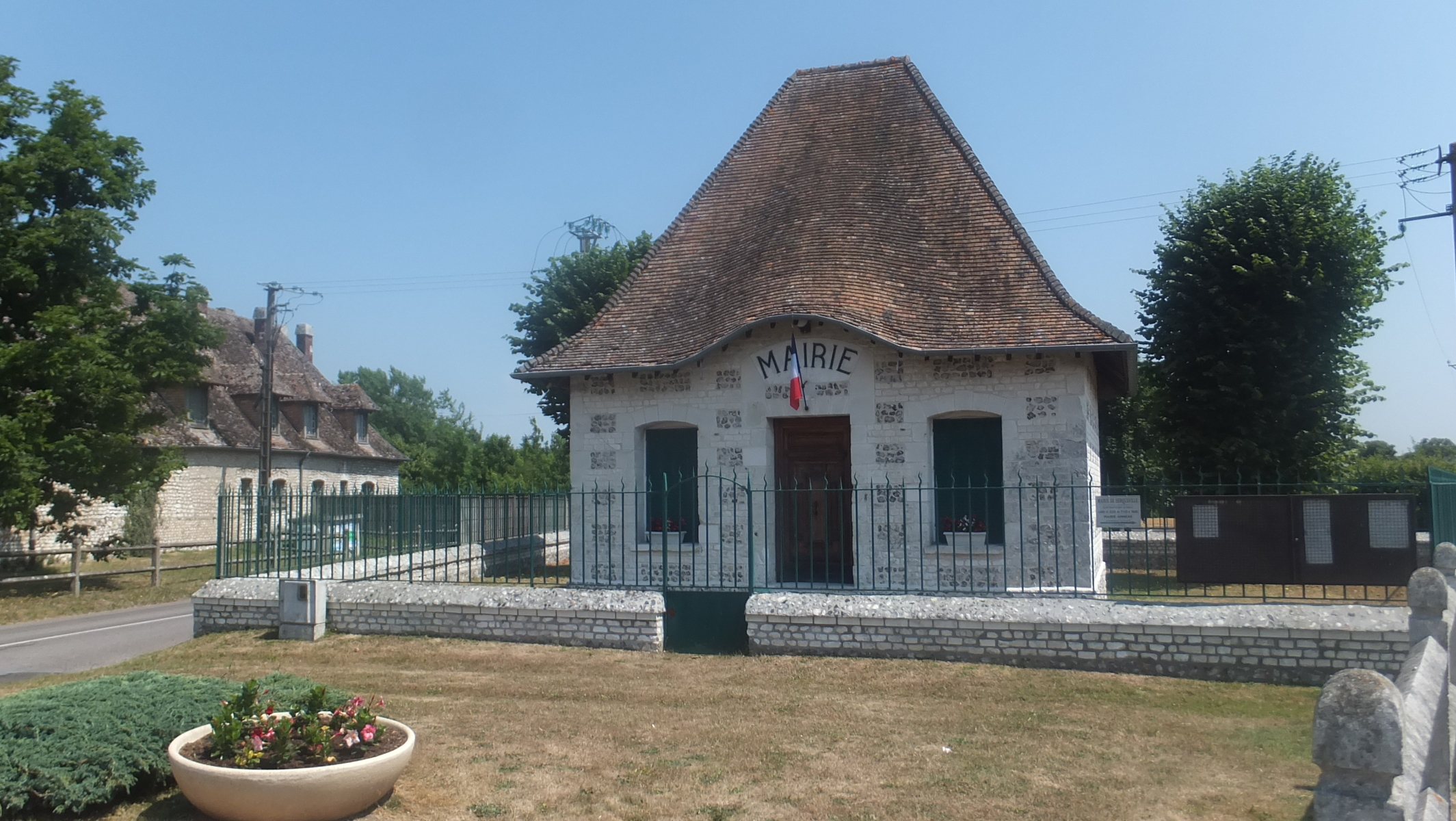
- The town hall in Herqueville

- Coat of arms
- Location of Herqueville
- Location within France Location within Normandy
- Coordinates: 49°14′43″N 1°15′48″E
- Country: France
- Region: Normandy
- Department: Eure
- Arrondissement: Les Andelys
- Canton: Val-de-Reuil
- Intercommunality: CA Seine-Eure

Government
  - Mayor (2020–2026): Annick Vauquelin
- Area^{1}: 3.76 km^{2} (1.45 sq mi)
- Elevation: 70 m (230 ft)
- Highest elevation: 65 m (213 ft)
- Lowest elevation: 6 m (20 ft)
- Population (2023): 122
  - Density: 32.4/km^{2} (84.0/sq mi)
- Time zone: UTC+01:00 (CET)
  - Summer (DST): UTC+02:00 (CEST)
- INSEE/Postal code: 27330 /27430
- ^{1} French Land Register data, which excludes lakes, ponds, glaciers > 1 km^{2} (0.386 sq mi or 247 acres) and river estuaries.

Herqueville (French pronunciation: [ɛʁkəvil]) is a commune in the Eure department in northern France.

== Population ==
Historical population
Year	Pop.	±% p.a.
1968	284	—
1975	293	+0.45%
1982	187	−6.21%
1990	182	−0.34%
1999	155	−1.77%
2007	152	−0.24%
2012	151	−0.13%
2017	134	−2.36%
2023	122	−1.55%
Source: INSEE

== See also ==
- Communes of the Eure department

== History ==
The local lords of the manor were the Maillet du Boulay family until 1934 when the estate was purchased by Louis Renault who is buried there.
