= Quatremare =

- Commune
- Location of Quatremare
- Location within France Location within Normandy
- Coordinates: 49°11′10″N 1°04′54″E
- Country: France
- Region: Normandy
- Department: Eure
- Arrondissement: Les Andelys
- Canton: Pont-de-l'Arche
- Intercommunality: Seine-Eure

Government
  - Mayor (2020–2026): Pascal Lemaire
- Area^{1}: 5.99 km^{2} (2.31 sq mi)
- Elevation: 158 m (518 ft)
- Highest elevation: 159 m (522 ft)
- Lowest elevation: 125 m (410 ft)
- Population (2023): 450
  - Density: 75/km^{2} (190/sq mi)
- Time zone: UTC+01:00 (CET)
  - Summer (DST): UTC+02:00 (CEST)
- INSEE/Postal code: 27483 /27400
- ^{1} French Land Register data, which excludes lakes, ponds, glaciers > 1 km^{2} (0.386 sq mi or 247 acres) and river estuaries.

Quatremare (French pronunciation: [katʁəmaʁ]) is a commune in the Eure department in Normandy in northern France.

== Population ==
Historical population
Year	Pop.	±% p.a.
1968	288	—
1975	315	+1.29%
1982	297	−0.84%
1990	311	+0.58%
1999	361	+1.67%
2007	375	+0.48%
2012	401	+1.35%
2017	418	+0.83%
2023	450	+1.24%
Source: INSEE

== See also ==
- Communes of the Eure department
