= Les Damps =

- Commune
- Coat of arms
- Location of Les Damps
- Location within France Location within Normandy
- Coordinates: 49°18′08″N 1°10′23″E
- Country: France
- Region: Normandy
- Department: Eure
- Arrondissement: Les Andelys
- Canton: Pont-de-l'Arche
- Intercommunality: CA Seine-Eure

Government
  - Mayor (2023–2026): Katia Camus
- Area^{1}: 4.74 km^{2} (1.83 sq mi)
- Elevation: 15 m (49 ft)
- Highest elevation: 129 m (423 ft)
- Lowest elevation: 2 m (6.6 ft)
- Population (2023): 1,322
  - Density: 279/km^{2} (722/sq mi)
- Time zone: UTC+01:00 (CET)
  - Summer (DST): UTC+02:00 (CEST)
- INSEE/Postal code: 27196 /27340
- ^{1} French Land Register data, which excludes lakes, ponds, glaciers > 1 km^{2} (0.386 sq mi or 247 acres) and river estuaries.

Les Damps (French pronunciation: [le dɑ̃]) is a commune in the Eure department in northern France.

== Population ==
Historical population

Year	Pop.	±% p.a.
1793	276	—
1821	285	+0.11%
1846	303	+0.25%
1872	263	−0.54%
1901	235	−0.39%
1926	408	+2.23%
1946	533	+1.35%
1954	578	+1.02%
1962	698	+2.39%

Year	Pop.	±% p.a.
1968	806	+2.43%
1975	894	+1.49%
1982	870	−0.39%
1990	943	+1.01%
1999	952	+0.11%
2007	1,191	+2.84%
2012	1,301	+1.78%
2017	1,389	+1.32%
2023	1,322	−0.82%

Source: EHESS and INSEE (1968-2023)

== See also ==
- Communes of the Eure department
