= La Haye-le-Comte =

- Commune
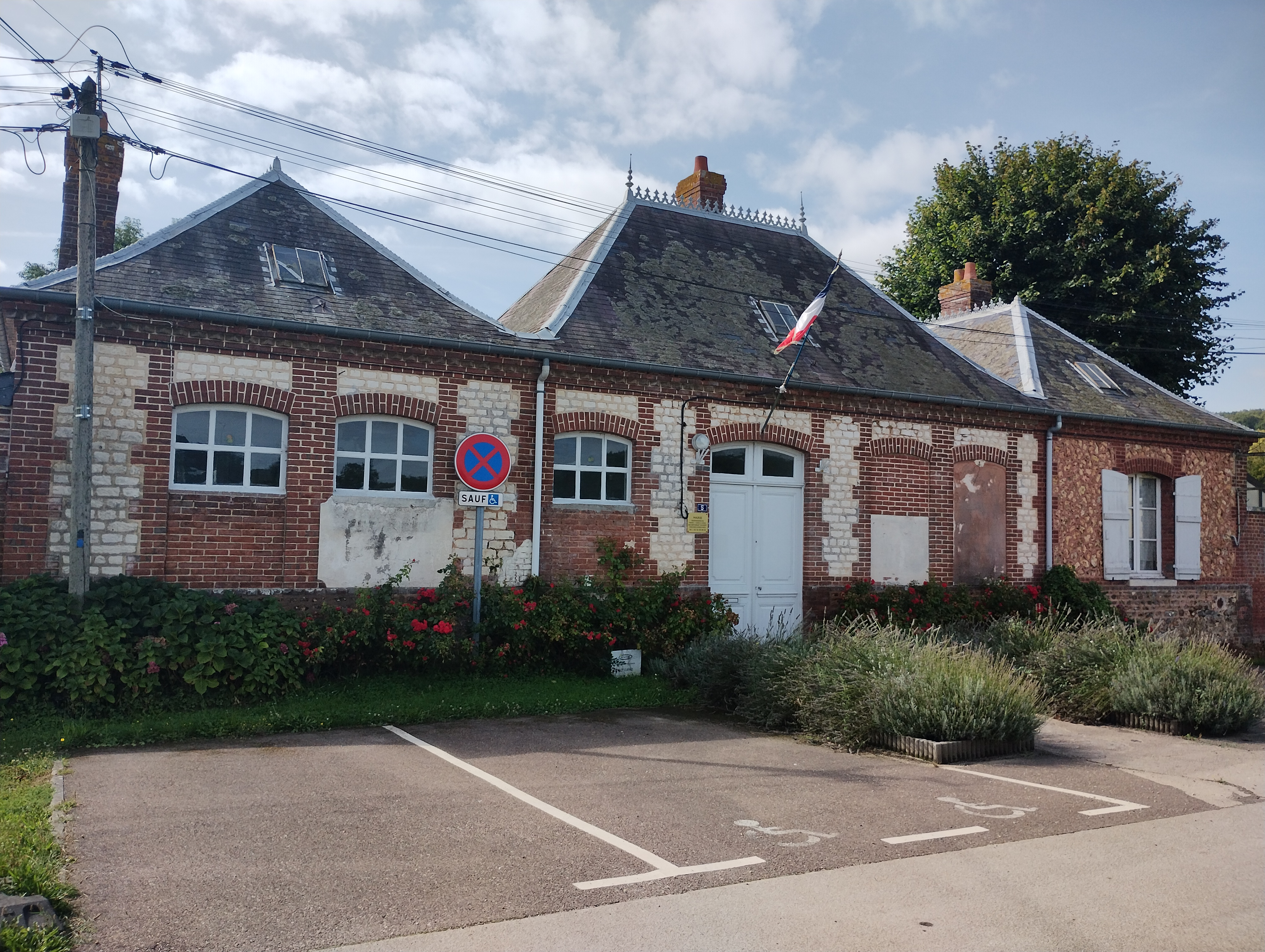
- La Haye-le-Comte Town hall

- Coat of arms
- Location of La Haye-le-Comte
- Location within France Location within Normandy
- Coordinates: 49°11′54″N 1°08′56″E
- Country: France
- Region: Normandy
- Department: Eure
- Arrondissement: Les Andelys
- Canton: Pont-de-l'Arche
- Intercommunality: CA Seine-Eure

Government
  - Mayor (2020–2026): Alexandre Delacour
- Area^{1}: 3.32 km^{2} (1.28 sq mi)
- Elevation: 61 m (200 ft)
- Highest elevation: 143 m (469 ft)
- Lowest elevation: 34 m (112 ft)
- Population (2023): 151
  - Density: 45.5/km^{2} (118/sq mi)
- Time zone: UTC+01:00 (CET)
  - Summer (DST): UTC+02:00 (CEST)
- INSEE/Postal code: 27321 /27400
- ^{1} French Land Register data, which excludes lakes, ponds, glaciers > 1 km^{2} (0.386 sq mi or 247 acres) and river estuaries.

La Haye-le-Comte (French pronunciation: [la ɛ lə kɔ̃t]) is a commune in the Eure department in northern France.

== Population ==
Historical population
Year	Pop.	±% p.a.
1968	52	—
1975	38	−4.38%
1982	64	+7.73%
1990	79	+2.67%
1999	115	+4.26%
2007	119	+0.43%
2012	129	+1.63%
2017	135	+0.91%
2023	151	+1.88%
Source: INSEE

== See also ==
- Communes of the Eure department
