= Léry, Eure =

Léry
- Commune
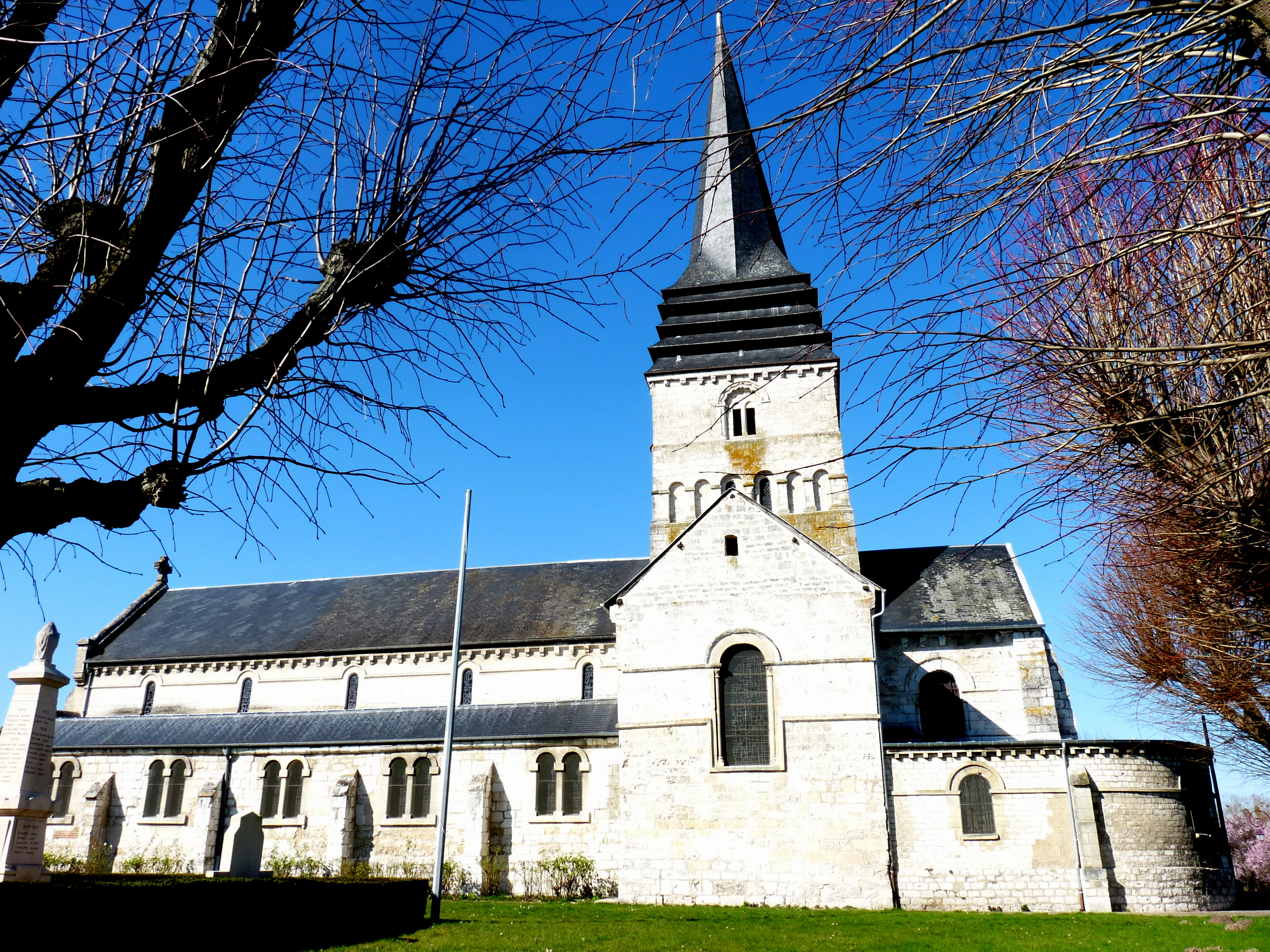
- The church of Saint-Ouen in Léry

- Coat of arms
- Location of Léry
- Location within France Location within Normandy
- Coordinates: 49°17′10″N 1°12′27″E
- Country: France
- Region: Normandy
- Department: Eure
- Arrondissement: Les Andelys
- Canton: Val-de-Reuil
- Intercommunality: CA Seine-Eure

Government
  - Mayor (2020–2026): Janick Léger
- Area^{1}: 14.51 km^{2} (5.60 sq mi)
- Elevation: 10 m (33 ft)
- Highest elevation: 128 m (420 ft)
- Lowest elevation: 5 m (16 ft)
- Population (2023): 1,975
  - Density: 136.1/km^{2} (352.5/sq mi)
- Time zone: UTC+01:00 (CET)
  - Summer (DST): UTC+02:00 (CEST)
- INSEE/Postal code: 27365 /27690
- ^{1} French Land Register data, which excludes lakes, ponds, glaciers > 1 km^{2} (0.386 sq mi or 247 acres) and river estuaries.

Léry (French pronunciation: [leʁi]) is a commune in the Eure department and Normandy region of France.

== Population ==
Historical population
Year	Pop.	±% p.a.
1968	992	—
1975	1,015	+0.33%
1982	1,617	+6.88%
1990	1,805	+1.38%
1999	2,139	+1.90%
2007	2,049	−0.54%
2012	2,100	+0.49%
2017	2,033	−0.65%
2023	1,975	−0.48%
Source: INSEE

== See also ==
- Communes of the Eure department
