= Poses, Eure =

Poses
- Commune
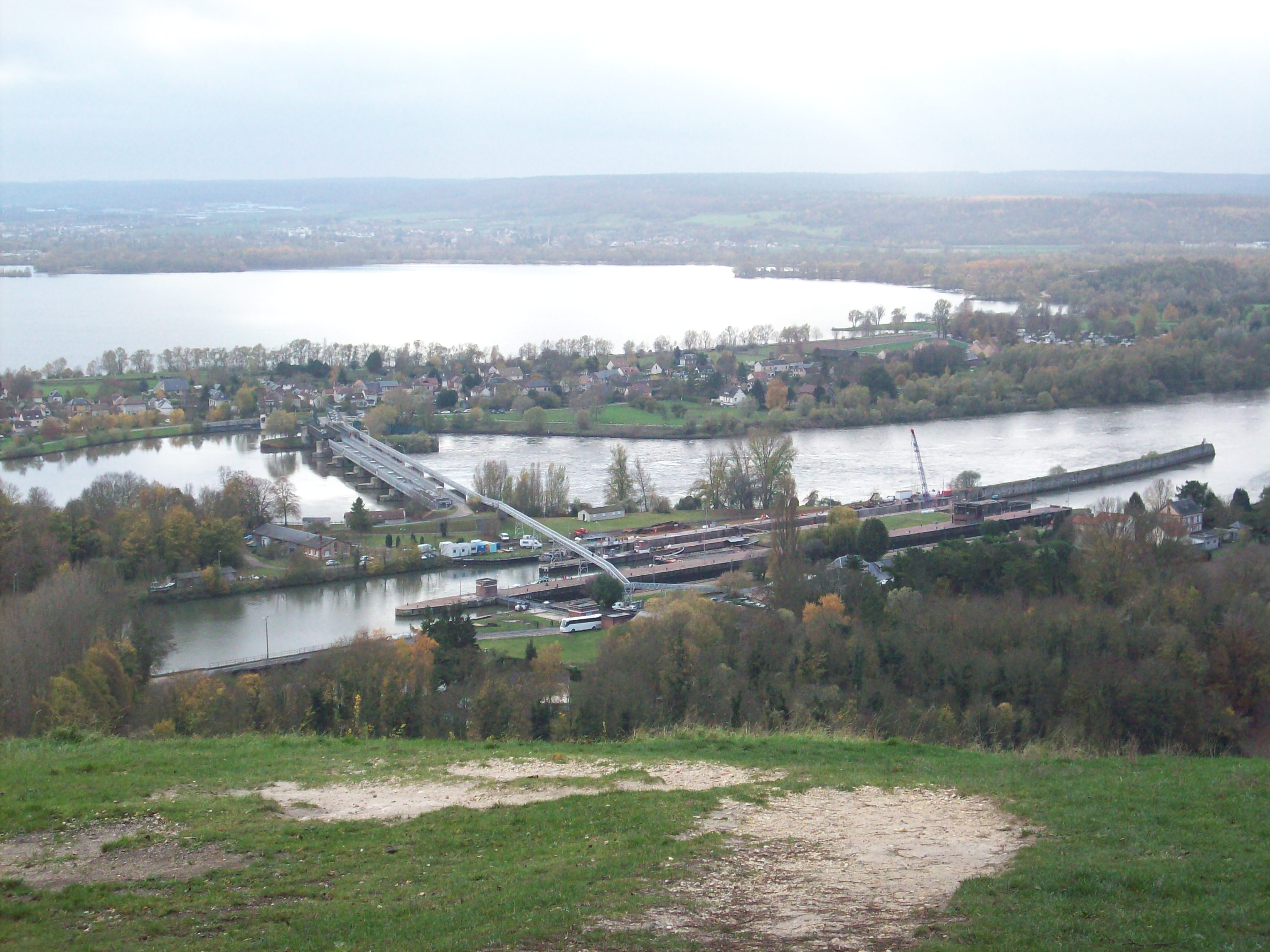
- The Poses dam
- Location of Poses
- Location within France Location within Normandy
- Coordinates: 49°18′17″N 1°14′44″E
- Country: France
- Region: Normandy
- Department: Eure
- Arrondissement: Les Andelys
- Canton: Val-de-Reuil
- Intercommunality: CA Seine-Eure

Government
  - Mayor (2020–2026): Georgio Loiseau
- Area^{1}: 7.2 km^{2} (2.8 sq mi)
- Elevation: 13 m (43 ft)
- Highest elevation: 12 m (39 ft)
- Lowest elevation: 8 m (26 ft)
- Population (2023): 1,127
  - Density: 160/km^{2} (410/sq mi)
- Time zone: UTC+01:00 (CET)
  - Summer (DST): UTC+02:00 (CEST)
- INSEE/Postal code: 27474 /27740
- ^{1} French Land Register data, which excludes lakes, ponds, glaciers > 1 km^{2} (0.386 sq mi or 247 acres) and river estuaries.

Poses (French pronunciation: [poz]) is a commune in the Eure department in Normandy in north-western France.

== Population ==
Historical population
Year	Pop.	±% p.a.
1968	1,074	—
1975	976	−1.36%
1982	959	−0.25%
1990	1,024	+0.82%
1999	1,107	+0.87%
2007	1,121	+0.16%
2012	1,164	+0.76%
2017	1,169	+0.09%
2023	1,127	−0.61%
Source: INSEE

== See also ==
- Communes of the Eure department
