= La Haye-Malherbe =

- Commune
- Location of La Haye-Malherbe
- Location within France Location within Normandy
- Coordinates: 49°13′33″N 1°04′07″E
- Country: France
- Region: Normandy
- Department: Eure
- Arrondissement: Les Andelys
- Canton: Pont-de-l'Arche
- Intercommunality: CA Seine-Eure

Government
  - Mayor (2020–2026): Serge Marais
- Area^{1}: 9.93 km^{2} (3.83 sq mi)
- Elevation: 140 m (460 ft)
- Highest elevation: 161 m (528 ft)
- Lowest elevation: 40 m (130 ft)
- Population (2023): 1,409
  - Density: 142/km^{2} (368/sq mi)
- Time zone: UTC+01:00 (CET)
  - Summer (DST): UTC+02:00 (CEST)
- INSEE/Postal code: 27322 /27400
- ^{1} French Land Register data, which excludes lakes, ponds, glaciers > 1 km^{2} (0.386 sq mi or 247 acres) and river estuaries.

La Haye-Malherbe (French pronunciation: [la ɛ malɛʁb]) is a commune in the Eure department in northern France.

== Population ==
Historical population
Year	Pop.	±% p.a.
1968	1,046	—
1975	1,087	+0.55%
1982	1,218	+1.64%
1990	1,395	+1.71%
1999	1,450	+0.43%
2007	1,476	+0.22%
2012	1,492	+0.22%
2017	1,403	−1.22%
2023	1,409	+0.07%
Source: INSEE

== See also ==
- Communes of the Eure department
