= Incarville =

- Commune
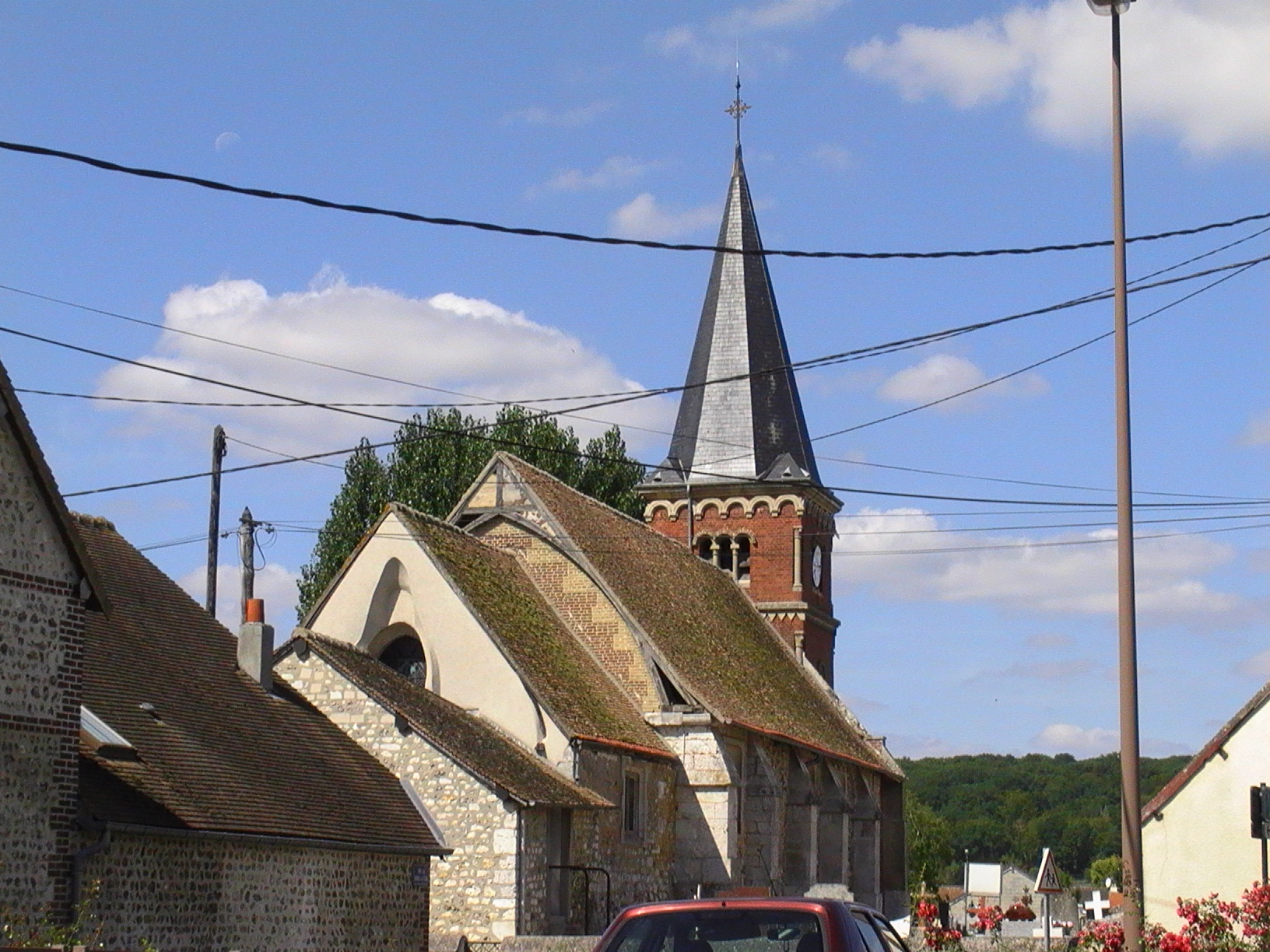
- The church of Saint-Pierre in Incarville
- Location of Incarville
- Location within France Location within Normandy
- Coordinates: 49°14′17″N 1°10′46″E
- Country: France
- Region: Normandy
- Department: Eure
- Arrondissement: Les Andelys
- Canton: Louviers
- Intercommunality: CA Seine-Eure

Government
  - Mayor (2020–2026): Patrick Maugars
- Area^{1}: 8.35 km^{2} (3.22 sq mi)
- Elevation: 31 m (102 ft)
- Highest elevation: 124 m (407 ft)
- Lowest elevation: 12 m (39 ft)
- Population (2023): 1,353
  - Density: 162/km^{2} (420/sq mi)
- Time zone: UTC+01:00 (CET)
  - Summer (DST): UTC+02:00 (CEST)
- INSEE/Postal code: 27351 /27400
- ^{1} French Land Register data, which excludes lakes, ponds, glaciers > 1 km^{2} (0.386 sq mi or 247 acres) and river estuaries.

Incarville (French pronunciation: [ɛ̃kaʁvil]) is a commune in the Eure department in northern France. Louviers is next to it, 2.5 km to the south.

== Population ==
Historical population
Year	Pop.	±% p.a.
1968	602	—
1975	920	+6.25%
1982	1,125	+2.92%
1990	1,458	+3.29%
1999	1,379	−0.62%
2007	1,326	−0.49%
2012	1,333	+0.11%
2017	1,416	+1.22%
2023	1,353	−0.76%
Source: INSEE

== See also ==
- Communes of the Eure department
