= Saint-Pierre-du-Vauvray =

- Commune
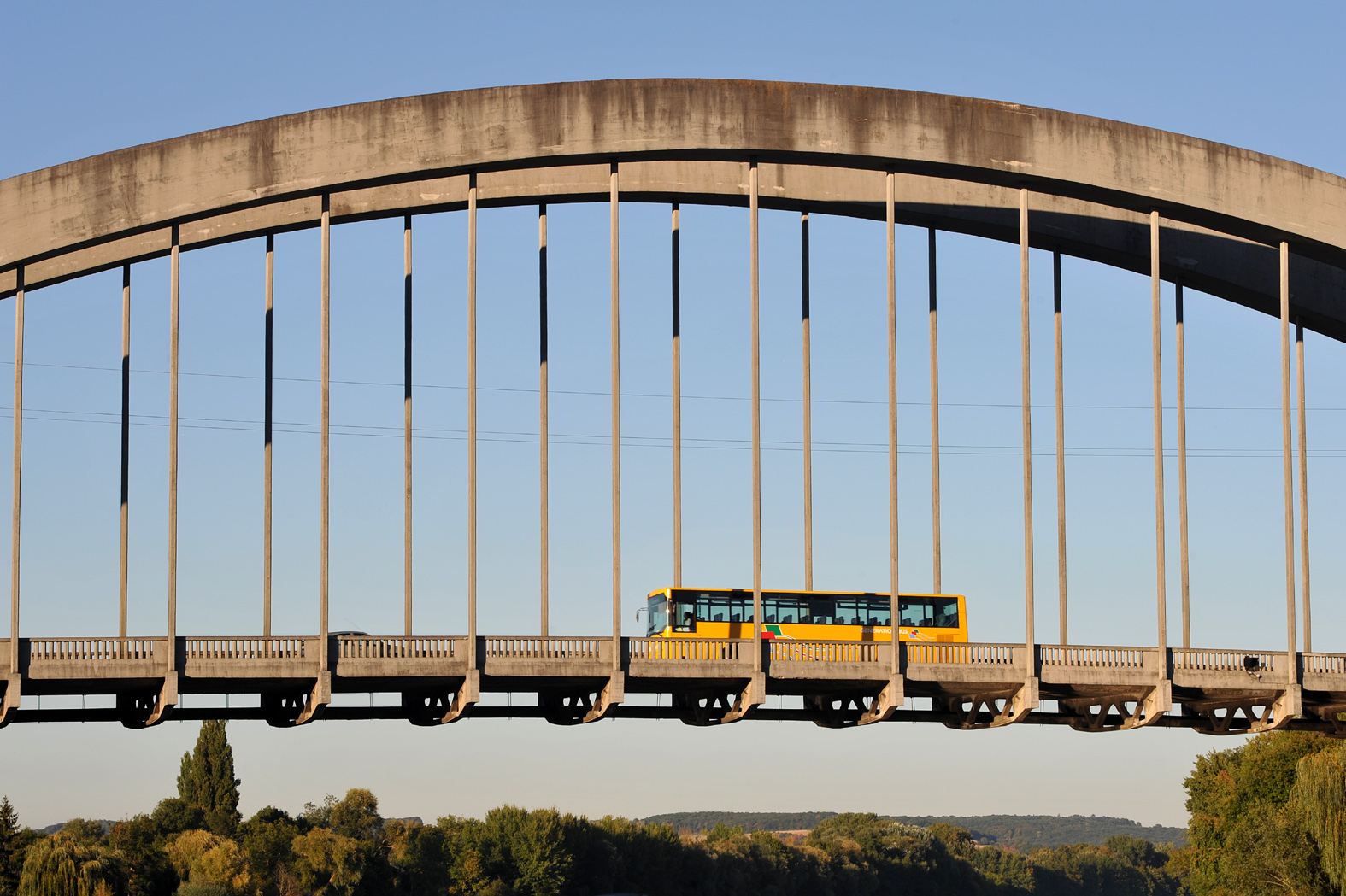
- Bridge over the Seine

- Coat of arms
- Location of Saint-Pierre-du-Vauvray
- Location within France Location within Normandy
- Coordinates: 49°13′58″N 1°13′19″E
- Country: France
- Region: Normandy
- Department: Eure
- Arrondissement: Les Andelys
- Canton: Louviers
- Intercommunality: CA Seine-Eure

Government
  - Mayor (2020–2026): Laetitia Sanchez
- Area^{1}: 5.22 km^{2} (2.02 sq mi)
- Elevation: 14 m (46 ft)
- Highest elevation: 128 m (420 ft)
- Lowest elevation: 7 m (23 ft)
- Population (2023): 1,224
  - Density: 234/km^{2} (607/sq mi)
- Time zone: UTC+01:00 (CET)
  - Summer (DST): UTC+02:00 (CEST)
- INSEE/Postal code: 27598 /27430
- ^{1} French Land Register data, which excludes lakes, ponds, glaciers > 1 km^{2} (0.386 sq mi or 247 acres) and river estuaries.

Saint-Pierre-du-Vauvray (French pronunciation: [sɛ̃ pjɛʁ dy vovʁɛ]) is a commune in the Eure department in Normandy in northern France.

== Population ==
Historical population
Year	Pop.	±% p.a.
1968	929	—
1975	929	+0.00%
1982	1,201	+3.74%
1990	1,113	−0.95%
1999	1,346	+2.13%
2007	1,339	−0.07%
2012	1,315	−0.36%
2017	1,282	−0.51%
2023	1,224	−0.77%
Source: INSEE

== See also ==
- Communes of the Eure department
