= Le Vaudreuil =

- Commune
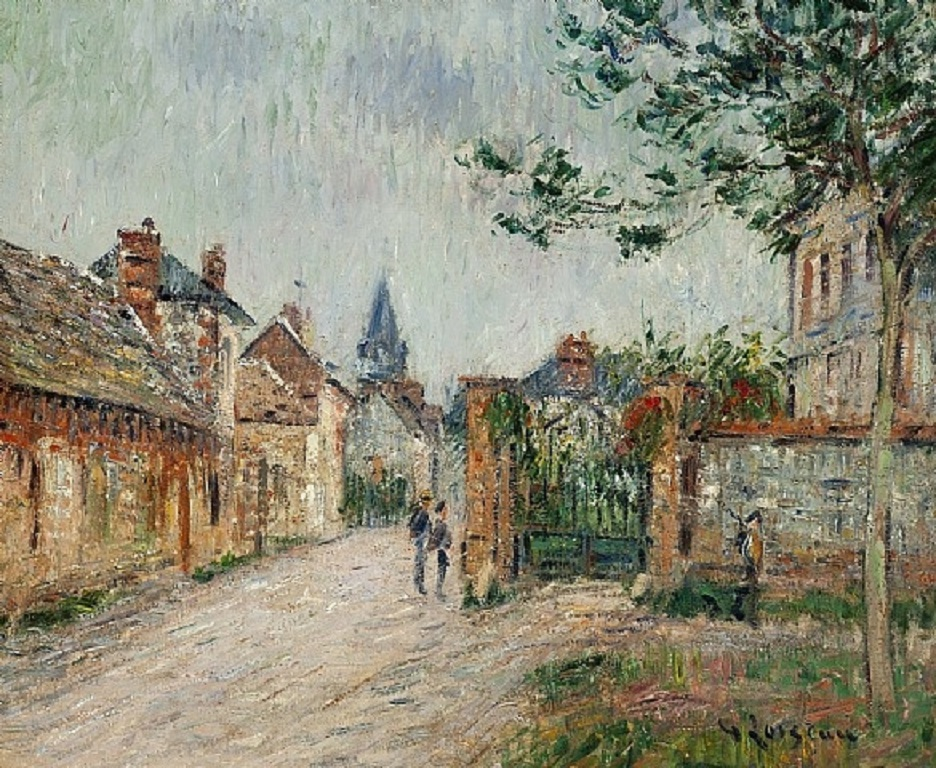
- A panorama of Saint-Cyr-du-Vaudreuil

- Coat of arms
- Location of Le Vaudreuil
- Location within France Location within Normandy
- Coordinates: 49°15′25″N 1°12′24″E
- Country: France
- Region: Normandy
- Department: Eure
- Arrondissement: Les Andelys
- Canton: Val-de-Reuil
- Intercommunality: CA Seine-Eure

Government
  - Mayor (2020–2026): Bernard Leroy
- Area^{1}: 14.22 km^{2} (5.49 sq mi)
- Elevation: 13 m (43 ft)
- Highest elevation: 127 m (417 ft)
- Lowest elevation: 8 m (26 ft)
- Population (2023): 3,624
  - Density: 254.9/km^{2} (660.1/sq mi)
- Time zone: UTC+01:00 (CET)
  - Summer (DST): UTC+02:00 (CEST)
- INSEE/Postal code: 27528 /27100
- ^{1} French Land Register data, which excludes lakes, ponds, glaciers > 1 km^{2} (0.386 sq mi or 247 acres) and river estuaries.

Le Vaudreuil (French pronunciation: [lə vodʁœj]) is a commune in the Eure department in Normandy in northern France.

On 15 April 1969 the commune of Notre-Dame-du-Vaudreuil was joined with that of Saint-Cyr-du-Vaudreuil to form the present Le Vaudreuil.

A bronze statue of the deputy Edgar Raoul-Duval was erected in 1890 in Notre-Dame-du-Vaudreuil.

== Population ==
Historical population
Year	Pop.	±% p.a.
1968	1,478	—
1975	1,891	+3.58%
1982	2,877	+6.18%
1990	3,079	+0.85%
1999	3,438	+1.23%
2007	3,508	+0.25%
2012	3,652	+0.81%
2017	3,722	+0.38%
2023	3,624	−0.44%
Source: INSEE

== Twin towns ==
Le Vaudreuil is twinned with Comberton, United Kingdom.

== See also ==
- Communes of the Eure department
