= Saint-Étienne-du-Vauvray =

- Commune
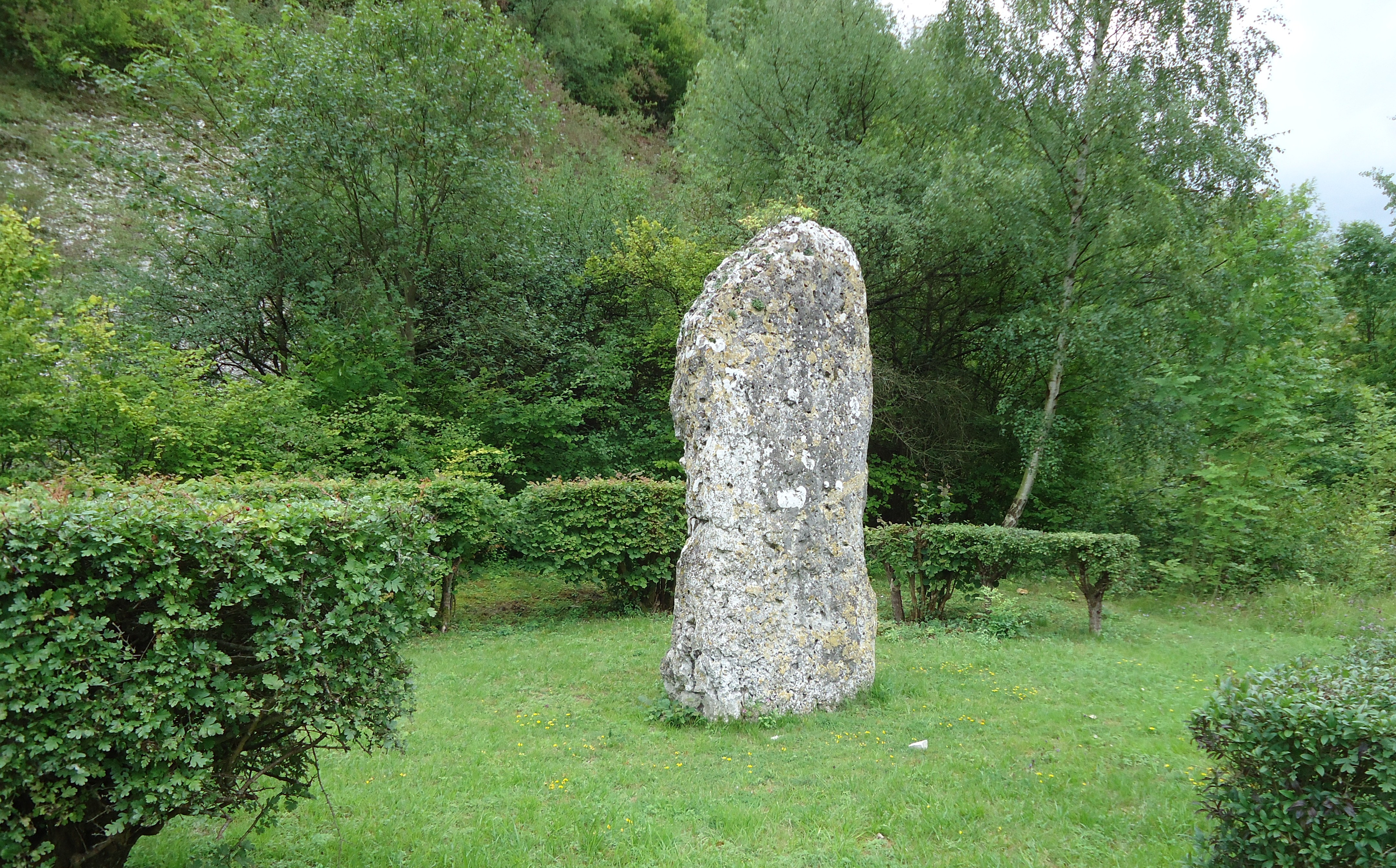
- Menhir

- Coat of arms
- Location of Saint-Étienne-du-Vauvray
- Location within France Location within Normandy
- Coordinates: 49°14′37″N 1°13′16″E
- Country: France
- Region: Normandy
- Department: Eure
- Arrondissement: Les Andelys
- Canton: Louviers
- Intercommunality: CA Seine-Eure

Government
  - Mayor (2020–2026): Eric Lardeur
- Area^{1}: 8.84 km^{2} (3.41 sq mi)
- Elevation: 13 m (43 ft)
- Highest elevation: 73 m (240 ft)
- Lowest elevation: 7 m (23 ft)
- Population (2023): 896
  - Density: 101/km^{2} (263/sq mi)
- Time zone: UTC+01:00 (CET)
  - Summer (DST): UTC+02:00 (CEST)
- INSEE/Postal code: 27537 /27430
- ^{1} French Land Register data, which excludes lakes, ponds, glaciers > 1 km^{2} (0.386 sq mi or 247 acres) and river estuaries.

Saint-Étienne-du-Vauvray (French pronunciation: [sɛ̃.t‿etjɛn dy vovʁɛ]) is a commune in the Eure department in the Normandy region in northern France.

== Population ==
Historical population
Year	Pop.	±% p.a.
1968	628	—
1975	639	+0.25%
1982	618	−0.48%
1990	680	+1.20%
1999	688	+0.13%
2007	706	+0.32%
2012	825	+3.16%
2017	882	+1.35%
2023	896	+0.26%
Source: INSEE

== See also ==
- Communes of the Eure department
