= Canton of Pont-de-l'Arche =

Coordinates: 49°18′12″N 1°8′56″E

Pont-de-l'Arche
- Canton
- Interactive map of Pont-de-l'Arche
- Country: France
- Region: Normandy
- Department: Eure
- No. of communes: {{{nbcomm}}}
- Area: 166.45 km^{2} (64.27 sq mi)
- Population (2023): 23,849
  - Density: 143.28/km^{2} (371.09/sq mi)
- INSEE code: 27 18

Canton of Pont-de-l'Arche is a canton of the Arrondissement of Les Andelys in the Eure department of France.

== Communes ==
At the French canton reorganisation which came into effect in March 2015, the canton was expanded from 10 to 21 communes (2 of which merged into the new commune Terres de Bord):

- Acquigny
- Alizay
- Amfreville-sur-Iton
- Crasville
- Criquebeuf-sur-Seine
- Les Damps
- La Haye-le-Comte
- La Haye-Malherbe
- Igoville
- Le Manoir
- Martot
- Le Mesnil-Jourdain
- Pinterville
- Pîtres
- Pont-de-l'Arche
- Quatremare
- Surtauville
- Surville
- Terres de Bord
- La Vacherie
