= Yvias =

Yvias Eviaz
- Commune
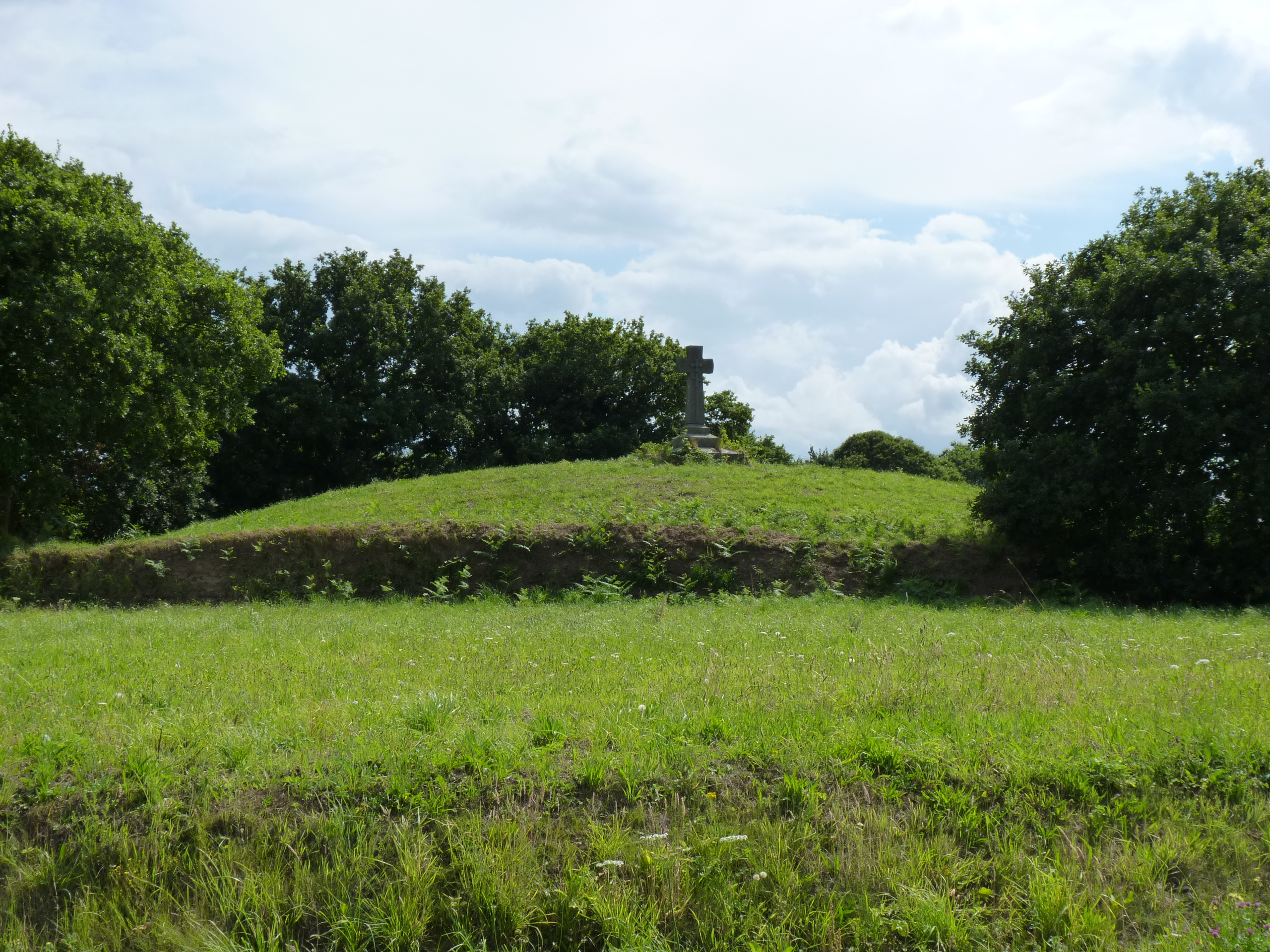
- The tumulus of Tossen ar Run, in Yvias
- Location of Yvias
- Location within France Location within Brittany
- Coordinates: 48°42′51″N 3°03′04″W
- Country: France
- Region: Brittany
- Department: Côtes-d'Armor
- Arrondissement: Guingamp
- Canton: Paimpol
- Intercommunality: Guingamp-Paimpol Agglomération

Government
  - Mayor (2020–2026): Karine Le Graet
- Area^{1}: 11.61 km^{2} (4.48 sq mi)
- Highest elevation: 107 m (351 ft)
- Lowest elevation: 8 m (26 ft)
- Population (2023): 765
  - Density: 65.9/km^{2} (171/sq mi)
- Time zone: UTC+01:00 (CET)
  - Summer (DST): UTC+02:00 (CEST)
- INSEE/Postal code: 22390 /22930
- ^{1} French Land Register data, which excludes lakes, ponds, glaciers > 1 km^{2} (0.386 sq mi or 247 acres) and river estuaries.

Yvias (French pronunciation: [ivjas]; Breton: Eviaz; Gallo: Ivinyac) is a commune in the Côtes-d'Armor department in Brittany in northwestern France.

== Population ==
Inhabitants of Yvias are called yviasais in French.

Historical population
Year	Pop.	±% p.a.
1968	706	—
1975	616	−1.93%
1982	623	+0.16%
1990	673	+0.97%
1999	661	−0.20%
2007	708	+0.86%
2012	749	+1.13%
2017	765	+0.42%
2023	765	+0.00%
Source: INSEE

== Nearest cities and towns ==
- Lanleff, 3 km
- Plourivo, 3.8 km
- Pléhédel, 5 km
- Kerfot, 5.3 km
- Quemper-Guézennec, 5.6 km
- Tréméven, 7.6 km
- Plouézec, 8.4 km
- Paimpol, 8.4 km
- Le Faouët, 9.1 kmm
- Lanloup, 9.2 km
- Pludual, 9,4 km

== See also ==
- Communes of the Côtes-d'Armor department
