= List of windmills in France =

A list of the windmills in France. Mills standing are in bold, remains are in italics.

== Aisne ==
Location	Name of mill	Type	Built	Notes	Photograph
Andigny-les-Fermes	Moulin de Andigny				
Beaurevoir	Moulin de Beaurevoir	Moulin Tour		Single storey stump. Moulins-a-Vent (in French)	
Laon	Eve Moulin	Moulin pivot			
Largny-sur-Automne	**Moulin de Coyolles**	Moulin Tour	1635	Moulins-a-Vent (in French)	
Saint Quentin	Moulin de Tous-vents	Moulin pivot			

== Alpes-de-Haute-Provence ==
Location	Name of mill	Type	Built	Notes	Photograph
Contadour	Moulin a Hameau	Moulin Tour		Ruin	
Montfuron	**Moulin St Elzear**	Moulin Tour	19th century	Moulins-a-Vent (in French)	
Montfuron	**Moulin à Les Arnoux**			Moulins-a-Vent (in French)	
Saint-Michel-l'Observatoire	**Moulin de Saint-Michel-l'Observatoire**	Moulin Tour			
Simiane-la-Rotonde	Moulins de Notre-Dame de Pitié	Moulin Tour	(two mills)		
Vachères		Moulin Tour		Ruin	
Vière		Moulin Tour		Truncated	

== Ardèche ==
Location	Name of mill	Type	Built	Notes	Photograph
Bourg-Saint-Andéol	**Moulin de Bourg St Andéol**	Moulin Tour		Moulins-a-Vent (in French)	

== Ardennes ==
Location	Name of mill	Type	Built	Notes	Photograph
Blombay		Moulin Tour			
Givet	Moulin de Mon Bijou				
Harricourt		Moulin Tour			

== Ariège ==
Location	Name of mill	Type	Built	Notes	Photograph
Carla-Bayle	Moulin de Cassagne	Moulin Tour		Moulins-a-Vent (in French)	
Durfort	**Moulin de Durfort**	Moulin Tour		Moulins-a-Vent (in French)	
Le Fossat	Moulin de Beauregard				
Le Fossat	Moulin de Barabasan				
Lézat-sur-Lèze	Moulins de la Garde			(two mills); Moulins-a-Vent (in French)	
Lissac	**Moulin de Lissac**	Moulin Tour		Moulins-a-Vent (in French)	
Saint-Quirc	**Moulin de Saint Quirc**	Moulin Tour		Moulins-a-Vent (in French)	

== Aube ==
Location	Name of mill	Type	Built	Notes	Photograph
Dosches	**Moulin de Dosches**	Moulin Pivot	2007	Moulins-a-Vent; Moulin des Dosches (in French)	
Montpothier	Moulin de Fresnoy	Moulin Tour		Moulins-a-Vent (in French)	

== Aude ==
See List of windmills in Aude

== Aveyron ==
Location	Name of mill	Type	Built	Notes	Photograph
La Couvertoirade	**Moulin de La Couvertoirade**	Moulin Tour			
Saujac	Moulin du Causse				

== Bas-Rhin ==
Location	Name of mill	Type	Built	Notes	Photograph
Orschwiller	Moulin du Château du Haut-Kœnigsbourg	Moulin tour a bois			

== Bouches-du-Rhône ==
See List of windmills in Bouches-du-Rhône

== Calvados ==
Location	Name of mill	Type	Built	Notes	Photograph
Bazenville		Moulin Tour			
Courseulles-sur-Mer	**Moulin de Courseulles-sur-Mer**	Petit Moulin		Moulins-a-Vent (in French)	
Cricqueville-en-Bessin	Moulin de Criqueville-en-Bessin	Moulin Tour		Moulins-a-Vent (in French)	
Longues-sur-Mer	Moulin Turquois				
Ranville		Moulin Tour			
Saint-Côme-de-Fresné	Moulin Turquois				

== Cantal ==
Location	Name of mill	Type	Built	Notes	Photograph
Celoux	**Moulin de Lagarde**	Moulin Tour		Moulins-a-Vent (in French)	
La Chapelle-Laurent	Moulin de Chaliac				
Saint-Poncy	**Moulin de St Poncy**	Moulin Tour		Moulins-a-Vent (in French)	

== Charente ==
Location	Name of mill	Type	Built	Notes	Photograph
Bessac	**Moulins de la Paille**	Moulin Tour			
Bors-de-Monrmoreau	**Moulin de Perdrigeau**	Moulin Tour			
Chantillac	Moulin de la Vergne				
Condéon	**Moulin du Grand Fief**	Moulin Tour		Moulins-a-Vent (in French)	
Nonac		Moulin Tour			
Parzac	Moulin de Mouche Dune				
Saint-Fort-sur-le-Né	Moulin des Harmelles				
Vaux-Rouillac	**Moulin de la Pyramide**	Moulin Tour		Moulins-a-Vent (in French)	
Villefagnan	**Moulin des Pierres Blanches**	Moulin Tour		Moulins-a-Vent (in French)	

== Charente-Maritime ==
See List of windmills in Charente-Maritime

== Cher ==
See List of windmills in Cher

== Corrèze ==
Location	Name of mill	Type	Built	Notes	Photograph
Valiergues	**Moulin de Bétinac**	Moulin Tour		Moulins-a-Vent (in French)	

== Corse-du-Sud ==
Location	Name of mill	Type	Built	Notes	Photograph
Bonifacio	**Moulins de Bonifacio**	Moulin Tour		(three mills); Moulins-a-Vent (in French)	

== Côte d'Or ==
Location	Name of mill	Type	Built	Notes	Photograph
Châtellenot	**Moulin de Châtellenot**	Moulin Tour	1854	Moulins-a-Vent (in French)	
Lacanche	**Moulin de Lacanche**	Moulin Tour		Moulins-a-Vent (in French)	
Montceau-et-Echarnant	**Moulin de Montceau-Echarnant**	Moulin Tour	1780	Moulins-a-Vent (in French)	
Santenay	**Moulin de Sourine**	Moulin Tour		Moulins-a-Vent (in French)	

== Côtes d'Armor ==
See List of windmills in Côtes-d'Armor

== Deux-Sèvres ==
See List of windmills in Deux-Sèvres

== Dordogne ==
Location	Name of mill	Type	Built	Notes	Photograph
Boisse	**(two mills)**	Moulin Tour			
Bourniquel	**Moulin de Couyrac**	Moulin Tour	1827	Moulins-a-Vent (in French)	
Capdrot-Monpazier	**Moulin à vent**	Moulin Tour		Moulins-a-Vent (in French)	
Cercles	**Moulin Cercles**	Moulin Tour		Moulins-a-Vent (in French)	
Domme	**Moulins de Domme**; **Moulin du Roy**	Moulin Tour		(two mills); Moulins-a-Vent (in French)	
Le Bournat-le-Bugue	**Moulin de Martigne**	Moulin Tour		Moulins-a-Vent (in French)	
Monbazillac	**Moulin de Malfourat**	Moulin Tour	15th century	Moulins-a-Vent (in French)	
Montazeau	**Moulin de Montazeau**	Moulin Tour			
Nojals-et-Clotte	**Moulin a Nojals et Clotte**	Moulin Tour		Moulins-a-Vent (in French)	
Pomport		Moulin Tour			
Pomport		Moulin Tour			
Saint-Julien-d'Eymet		Moulin Tour			
Saint-Martial-de-Nabirat		Moulin Tour			
Saint Méard-de-Gurçon		Moulin Tour			
Saint-Vincent-de-Connezac	**Moulin à vent**	Moulin Tour			
Saint-Vivien		Moulin Tour			

== Doubs ==
Location	Name of mill	Type	Built	Notes	Photograph
Courvières	**Moulin de Courvières**	Éolienne Bollée		Racines Comtoises (in French)	

== Drôme ==
Location	Name of mill	Type	Built	Notes	Photograph
Donzère	**Moulin de Donzère**	Moulin Tour		Moulins-a-Vent (in French)	
Pierrelatte	**Moulin de Pierrelatte**	Moulin Tour		Moulins-a-Vent (in French)	
Recoubeau-Jansac	Moulin de Jansac-Recoubeau	Moulin Tour		Moulins-a-Vent (in French)	
Saint-Paul-Trois-Châteaux	Moulin de St Paul Trois Châteaux	Moulin Tour		Moulins-a-Vent (in French)	
Vassieux-en-Vercours	**Moulin de Vassieux en Vercours**	Moulin Tour		Moulins-a-Vent (in French)	
Vassieux-en-Vercours	Moulins de Vassieux en Vercours	Moulin Tour		(two mills); Moulins-a-Vent (in French)	

== Essonne ==
Location	Name of mill	Type	Built	Notes	Photograph
Brunoy		Moulin Tour			
Étampes	**Moulin de Jonville**	Moulin Pivot		Moulins-a-Vent (in French)	
Massy	**Moulin du Parc**	Moulin Tour		Moulins-a-Vent (in French)	
Viry-Châtillon	**Moulin des Blancs Manteaux**	Moulin Tour		Moulins-a-Vent (in French)	

== Eure ==
Location	Name of mill	Type	Built	Notes	Photograph
Aubevoye	Moulin du Château de Tournebut.	Moulin Tour			
Fontenay	**Moulin du Bois du But**	Moulin Tour		Moulins-a-Vent (in French)	
Gaillon	Moulin de l'Hermitage				
Hauville	**Moulin de Pierre**	Moulin Tour		Moulins-a-Vent (in French)	
Mouflaines	Moulin de Mouflaines	Moulin Tour	17th century	Moulins-a-Vent (in French)	
Port-Mort	Moulin de la Butte de Châteauneuf				
Sainte-Barbe-sur-Gaillon	Moulin des Quatre Vents	Moulin Tour			
Tosny	Moulin de Tosny				
Tostes	Moulin de Tostes				
Tourny	**Moulin de Tourny**	Moulin Tour		Moulins-a-Vent (in French)	

== Eure-et-Loir ==
Location	Name of mill	Type	Built	Notes	Photograph
Baignolet		Moulin Pivot			
Bazoches-en-Dunois	**Moulin de St Thomas**	Moulin Pivot		Moulins-a-Vent (in French)	
Bouville	**Moulin Pelard**; **Moulin Bos de Feugères**	Moulin Pivot	1796	Moulins-a-Vent (in French)	
Clévilliers	Moulin de Clévilliers; Moulin de Pierre	Moulin Tour		Moulins-a-Vent (in French)	
Crucey	Moulin de Crucey	Moulin Tour			
Janville	**Moulin de Janville**	Moulin Tour		Moulins-a-Vent (in French)	
Levesville-la-Chenard	**Moulin de Levesville**; **Moulin Barbier**	Moulin Pivot	1789	Moulins-a-Vent (in French)	
Maisons	**Moulin de Mont**	Moulin Pivot	17th century	Moulins-a-Vent (in French)	
Moutiers-en-Beauce	**Moulin de Chesnay**	Moulin Pivot	1770	Moulins-a-Vent (in French)	
Ouarville	**Le Grand Moulin**	Moulin Pivot		Moulins-a-Vent (in French)	
Ozoir-le-Breuil	**Moulin de Frouville-Pensiér**	Moulin Tour	1826	Moulins-a-Vent	
Ozoir-le-Breuil	**Moulin de Pierre**	Moulin Tour		Moulins-a-Vent (in French)	
Péronville	**Moulin de Machelainville-Peronville**	Moulin Tour		Moulins-a-Vent (in French)	
Pontgouin	**Moulin de Pontgouin**	Moulin Tour		Moulins-a-Vent (in French)	
Sancheville	**Moulin de Paradis**	Moulin Pivot	1625	Moulins-a-Vent (in French)	
Ymonville	**Moulin de Garenne**	Moulin Pivot	1836	Moulins-a-Vent (in French)	

== Finistère ==
See List of windmills in Finistère

== Gard ==
Location	Name of mill	Type	Built	Notes	Photograph
Aramon	**Moulin Neuf**	Moulin Tour		Moulins-a-Vent (in French)	
Aramon	Moulin de Busso	Moulin Tour en Bois		Remains of the base demolished for roadworks, March 2001. Moulins-a-Vent (in French)	
Arlinde		Moulin Tour			
Aubussargues	Moulin aux Quatre Routes				
Beauvoisin		Moulin Tour			
Calvisson	Moulin de Calvisson	Moulin Cavier		Base remains. Moulins-a-Vent (in French)	
Calvisson	**Moulin de l'Ouest**	Moulin Tour		Moulins-a-Vent (in French)	
Calvisson	**Moulin Ébréché**	Moulin Tour			
Calvisson	**Moulin Pointu**	Moulin Tour		Moulins-a-Vent (in French)	
Castillon-du-Gard	**Moulin de Castillon du Gard**	Moulin Tour	1719	Moulins-a-Vent (in French)	
Junas	**Moulin de Junas**	Moulin Tour		Moulins-a-Vent (in French)	
Langlade	**Moulin Cavalier**	Moulin Tour		Moulins-a-Vent (in French)	
Le Calmette		Moulin Tour			
Nîmes	Moulin Saint Cesare				
Pujaut	Moulin de Pujaut	Moulin Tour			
Rochefort-du-Gard	Moulin de Rochefort du Gard	Moulin Tour			
Vénéjan	**Moulin de Vénéjan**	Moulin Tour			
Vergèze	Moulin de Vergèze				

== Gers ==
Location	Name of mill	Type	Built	Notes	Photograph
Auch	Moulin de Marignan	Moulin Tour			
Ayguetinte		Moulin Tour			
Castéra-Verduzan		Moulin Tour			
Castéra-Verduzan		Moulin Tour			
Cézan		Moulin Tour			
Condom	**Moulin de Mousarron**	Moulin Tour		Moulins-a-Vent (in French)	
Courrensan	Moulin de Courrensan				
Durban	**Moulin de Durban**	Moulin Tour			
Esclassan-Labastide		Moulin tour en bois			
Estipouy	Moulin de Montagnan	Moulin Tour			
Gaudonville	Moulin a Gaudonville				
Larroque-Saint-Sernin		Moulin Tour			
Lavardens	Moulins de Lavardens			Two mills	
Lupiac	Moulin St Jaymes	Moulin Tour			
Masseube		Moulin Tour			
Mauvezin	**Moulin a Mauvezin**	Moulin Tour		Moulins-a-Vent (in French)	
Miradoux		Moulin Tour			
Monbrun	Moulin du Puylauret				
Monbrun	Moulin Ardut				
Montpezat	**Moulin à vent de Gensac**	Moulin Tour			
Montpezat	Tour des Fées	Moulin Tour			
Montaut-les-Créneaux	**Moulin a Montaut les Créneaux**	Moulin Tour		Moulins-a-Vent (in French)	
Montaut-les-Créneaux	Moulin a Montaut les Créneaux	Moulin Tour		Moulins-a-Vent (in French)	
Pauilhac		Moulin Tour			
Pujaudran	Moulin de Chau				
Puységur		Moulin Tour			
Razengues	Moulin à vent de Meau	Moulin Tour			
Réjaumont		Moulin Tour			
Saint-Antoine		Moulin Tour			
Saint-Antonin		Moulin Tour			
Saint-Blancard		Moulin Tour			
Saint-Clar	Moulin de Rochegaude				
Sainte-Radegonde	Moulin de Ribère	Moulin Tour			
Tachoires		Moulin Tour			

== Gironde ==
See List of windmills in Gironde

== Hauts-de-Seine ==
Location	Name of mill	Type	Built	Notes	Photograph
Bécon-les-Bruyères		Moulin Tour			
Châtillon	Moulin de la tour à Châtillon	Moulin Tour			
Clamart	Moulin de Pierre	Moulin Tour		Destroyed during the Franco-Prussian War.	
Colombes	Moulin Joli	Moulin Pivot			
Gennevilliers	Petit moulin de Gennevilliers	Moulin Tour			
Nanterre	**Moulin des Gibets**	Moulin Tour	1785	Moulins-a-Vent (in French)	
Puteaux	**Moulin de Chantecoq**	Moulin Tour	1648	CFPPHR (in French); Moulins-a-Vent (in French)	
Rueil-Malmaison		Moulin Tour			
Suresnes	Moulin de Longchamp	Moulin Tour			

== Haute-Corse ==
Location	Name of mill	Type	Built	Notes	Photograph
Baragogna	**Moulins du Monte Rossu**	Moulin Tour		Two mills Moulins-a-Vent (in French)	
Centuri	**Moulin de Calbelle**	Moulin Tour		Moulins-a-Vent (in French)	
Ersa-Boticella	**Moulin Mattei**	Moulin Tour		Moulins-a-Vent (in French)	
Col de la Serra	**Moulins de Boticella**	Moulin Tours		Two mills (in French)	
L'Île-Rousse	Moulin de L'Île de Rousse	Moulin Tour		Moulins-a-Vent (in French)	
Macinaggio	Moulins de Macinaggio	Moulin Tour		Two mills Moulins-a-Vent (in French)	
Meria	**Moulin de Tomino**	Moulin Tour		Moulins-a-Vent (in French)	
Morsiglia	(two mills)	Moulin Tours			
Rogliano	**Moulin de Rogliano**	Moulin Tour		Moulins-a-Vent (in French)	
Rogliano	Moulin de Rogliano	Moulin Tour		Moulins-a-Vent (in French)	

== Haute-Garonne ==
See List of windmills in Haute-Garonne

== Haute-Loire ==
Location	Name of mill	Type	Built	Notes	Photograph
Ally	**Moulin de Pargeat**; **Moulin Vivant**	Moulin Tour		Moulins-a-Vent (in French)	
Ally	**Moulin du Montrome**	Moulin Tour		Moulins-a-Vent (in French)	
Ally	**Moulin du Calvaire**	Moulin Tour		Moulins-a-Vent (in French)	
Ally	**Moulin de la Meunière**	Moulin Tour		Moulins-a-Vent (in French)	
Ally	**Moulin de la Maison Blanche**; **Moulin à Paroles**	Moulin Tour		Moulins-a-Vent (in French)	
Ally	**Moulin de l'Arbre de la Garde**	Moulin Tour		Moulins-a-Vent (in French)	
Ally	Moulin du Monteil	Moulin Tour		Moulins-a-Vent (in French)	
Lavoûte-Chilhac	Moulin de Lavoûte-Chilhac	Moulin Tour		Moulins-a-Vent (in French)	

== Hérault ==
Location	Name of mill	Type	Built	Notes	Photograph
Beaufort	Moulin de Beaufort	Moulin Tour		Moulins-a-Vent (in French)	
Cesseras	Moulin de Cesseras	Moulin Tour		Moulins-a-Vent (in French)	
Faugères	**Moulin de Faugères**	Moulin Tour	16th century	Restored; Moulins-a-Vent (in French)	
Faugères	**Moulin de Faugères**	Moulin Tour	16th century	No sails Moulins-a-Vent (in French)	
Faugères	**Moulin de Faugères**	Moulin Tour	16th century	Tower only Moulins-a-Vent (in French)	
Félines-Minervois	**Moulin de Félines Minervois**; **Moulin du Pech de Marasi**	Moulin Tour	1780	Moulins-a-Vent (in French)	
La Livinière	Moulin de La Livinière	Moulin Tour		Moulins-a-Vent (in French)	
Nissan-lez-Enserune	**Moulin de Tiquet**	Moulin Tour		Moulins-a-Vent (in French)	
Nissan-lez-Enserune	**Moulin Balaye**	Moulin Tour	17th century	Moulins-a-Vent (in French)	
Olonzac	Moulin a Olonzac	Moulin Tour		Moulins-a-Vent (in French)	
Pouzolles	Moulin de Pouzolles				
Puissalicon	Moulin de la Salabert				
Quarante	Moulin a Quarante	Moulin Tour		Moulins-a-Vent (in French)	
Quarante		Éolienne Bollée			
Siran	Moulin a Siran	Moulin Tour		Moulins-a-Vent (in French)	
Saint-Chinian	**Moulin du Rocher**	Moulin Tour		Moulins-a-Vent (in French)	
Saint-Gervasy	Moulin Souchon				
Saint-Gervasy	Moulin d'Yrolet				
Saint-Pierre-de-la-Fage	**Moulin de Saint Pierre de la Fage**	Moulin Tour	19th century	Moulin de Saint Pierre de la Fage (in French); Moulins-a-Vent (in French)	
Salasc]		Moulin Tour			
Vendres]		Moulin Tour			

== Ille-et-Vilaine ==
See List of windmills in Ille-et-Vilaine

== Indre ==
Location	Name of mill	Type	Built	Notes	Photograph
Buzançais	**Moulin de Buzançais**	Moulin Tour		Moulins-a-Vent (in French)	

== Indre-et-Loire ==
Location	Name of mill	Type	Built	Notes	Photograph
Bléré	**Moulin des Aigremonts**	Moulin Cavier		Moulins-a-Vent (in French)	
Bourgueil	**Le Moulin Bleu**; **Moulin de la Lande**	Moulin Cavier	19th century	Moulins-a-Vent (in French)	
Candes-Saint-Martin	Moulin du Puy St Michel	Moulin Cavier		Base remains Moulins-a-Vent (in French)	
Candes-Saint-Martin	Moulin de la Pelouse	Moulin Cavier		Fragment of base remains Moulins-a-Vent (in French)	
Château-la-Vallière	Moulin de Lublé				
Chinon	Moulins de la Rochette	Moulin Cavier	1750	Four mills, bases remain. Moulins-a-Vent (in French)	
Chouzé-sur-Loire	Moulin de Lécé	Moulin Cavier	1820	Base remains Moulins-a-Vent (in French)	
Chouzé-sur-Loire	Moulins des Pelouzes	Moulin Cavier	1780; 1819	Two mills, bases remain Moulins-a-Vent (in French)	
Cinais	**Moulin de la Devinière**	Moulin Tour		Moulins-a-Vent (in French)	
Montlouis-sur-Loire	**Moulin a Montlouis-sur-Loire**	Moulin Tour		Moulins-a-Vent (in French)	
Montreuil-en-Touraine	Moulin de Villagou	Moulin Tour			
Richelieu	**Moulin de Richelieu**	Moulin Tour		Moulins-a-Vent (in French)	
Rivière	Moulin de Rivière				
Savigny-en-Véron	**Moulin des Veaux**	Moulin Cavier	1860	Moulins-a-Vent (in French)	
Savigny-en-Véron	Moulin des Veaux	Moulin Cavier	1870	Base remains Moulins-a-Vent (in French)	
Seuilly	**Moulin de la Mêlière**	Moulin Tour		Moulins-a-Vent (in French)	
Theneuil	**Moulin de la Planche**	Moulin Tour		Moulins-a-Vent (in French)	

== Landes ==
Location	Name of mill	Type	Built	Notes	Photograph
Bénesse-lès-Dax	**Moulin de Bénesse lès Dax**	Moulin Tour		Moulins-a-Vent (in French)	
Parleboscq	Moulin de la Forge				

== Loire-Atlantique ==
See List of windmills in Loire-Atlantique.

== Loiret ==
Location	Name of mill	Type	Built	Notes	Photograph
Artenay	**Moulin des Muets**; **Moulin de Pierre**	Moulin Tour		Moulins-a-Vent (in French)	
Baule	Moulin des Troussets	Moulin Tour		Moulins-a-Vent (in French)	
Chaingy	**Moulin du Tertre**	Moulin Tour		Moulins-a-Vent (in French)	
Chaingy	**Moulin de Pierre**	Moulin Tour		Moulins-a-Vent (in French)	
Chapelon	**Moulin de Gaillardin**	Moulin Pivot	15th century	Moulins-a-Vent (in French)	
Cléry-Saint-André	**Moulin du Mardereau**	Moulin Tour	1745	Moulins-a-Vent (in French)	
Dadonville	**Moulin de Denainvilliers**	Moulin Tour		Moulins-a-Vent (in French)	
Dry	**Moulin a Ceramique**	Moulin Tour en Bois		Moulins-a-Vent	
Greneville-en-Beauce	Moulin de Greneville	Moulin Pivot		Roundhouse remains Moulins-a-Vent (in French)	
Guilly	**Moulin de Bel Air**	Moulin Tour	18th century	Originally built at Châteauneuf-sur-Loire, moved to Guilly in 1861. Moulins-a-Vent (in French)	
Ingré	**Moulin de Martin**	Moulin Tour		Moulins-a-Vent (in French)	
La Chapelle-Saint-Mesmin	**Moulin de Pailly**	Moulin Tour		Moulins-a-Vent (in French)	
Le Bardon	Vieux Moulin	Moulin Pivot			
Les Bordes	**Le Moulin aux Oiseaux**	Moulin Pivot	1985	Moulins-a-Vent (in French)	
Loury	**Moulin de l'Épinay**	Moulin Pivot		Moulins-a-Vent (in French)	
Patay-Coinces	**Moulin de Lignerolles**	Moulin Pivot		Moulins-a-Vent (in French)	
Pithiviers	(two mills)	Moulin Pivots			

== Loir-et-Cher ==
Location	Name of mill	Type	Built	Notes	Photograph
Épuisay		Éolienne Bollée			
La Chaussée-Saint-Victor	Moulin Chouard	Moulin Tour		Moulins-a-Vent (in French)	
La Chaussée-Saint-Victor	**Moulin de La Chaussée-Saint-Victor**	Moulin Tour		Moulins-a-Vent (in French)	
Les Montils	Moulin de Les Montils	Moulin Tour		Moulins-a-Vent (in French)	
Maves	**Moulin de Lonlon**; **Moulin de Marcou**	Moulin Pivot	15th century	Moulins-a-Vent (in French)	
Noyers-sur-Cher	**Moulin de la Motte Badouin**	Moulin Tour	1856	Moulins-a-Vent (in French)	
Oucques	**Moulin de Lory**	Moulin Pivot		Moulins-a-Vent (in French)	
Pouillé	**Moulin de Pouillé**	Moulin Tour		Moulins-a-Vent (in French)	
Saint-Dyé-sur-Loire	Moulin de l'Ecuelle	Moulin Cavier		Base remains Moulins-a-Vent (in French)	
Saint-Laurent-Nouan	Moulin Crapaudeau	Moulin Cavier	19th century	Base remains Moulins-a-Vent (in French)	
Saint-Laurent-Nouan	**Moulin St Jacques**	Moulin Cavier	Early 19th century	Moulins-a-Vent (in French)	
Talcy	**Moulin Chatenay**; **Moulin de Talcy**	Moulin Pivot	1790	Moulins-a-Vent (in French)	
Vouzon	Moulin de la Grillière				

== Lot ==
Location	Name of mill	Type	Built	Notes	Photograph
Bach	Moulin de Bach				
Beauregard	Moulin a Beauregard				
Cahors	**Moulin de Cahors**	Moulin Tour			
Carlucet	**Moulin de la Lacomté**	Moulin Tour	1688	Moulins-a-Vent (in French)	
Castelnau-Montratier	**Moulin de la Mairie**; **Moulin de la Malaudie**	Moulin Tour		Moulins-a-Vent (in French)	
Castelnau-Montratier	**Moulin de Castelnau Montratier**	Moulin Tour		Moulins-a-Vent (in French)	
Castelnau-Montratier	**Moulin de Rigal**; **Moulin Cornus**	Moulin Tour		Moulins-a-Vent (in French)	
Cieurac	**Moulin de Pierre**	Moulin Tour	1672	Moulins-a-Vent (in French)	
Gignac	**Moulin Gignac**	Moulin Tour			
Lamothe-Cassel	**Moulin de Lamothe Cassel**	Moulin Tour		Moulins-a-Vent (in French)	
Laramière	Moulin a Laramière				
Lugagnac		Moulin Tour			
Lunan	**Moulin de Seygrignac**	Moulin Tour	15th century	Moulins-a-Vent (in French)	
Promilhanes	**Moulin du Mas de la Bosse**	Moulin Tour	1828	Moulins-a-Vent (in French)	
Saint-Chels	**Moulin de Saint Chels**	Moulin Tour	1797	Worpress (in French)	
Saint-Jean-de-Laur	**Moulin de Saint Jean de Laur**	Moulin Tour		Moulins-a-Vent (in French)	
Sainte-Alauzie	**Moulins de Boisse**	Moulin Tour		Two mills, both restored Moulins-a-Vent (in French)	
Valprionde	**Moulin de Bagor**	Moulin Tour			
Vaylats	Moulin de Vaylats				

== Lot-et-Garonne ==
See List of windmills in Lot-et-Garonne

== Lozère ==
Location	Name of mill	Type	Built	Notes	Photograph
Hures-la-Parade	**Moulin de la Norie**	Moulin tour			

== Maine-et-Loire ==
See List of windmills in Maine-et-Loire.

== Manche ==
See List of Windmills in Manche.

== Marne ==
Location	Name of mill	Type	Built	Notes	Photograph
Athis	**Moulin d'Athis**	Moulin Tour	1587	Moulins-a-Vent (in French)	
Châlons-en-Champagne	**Moulin du Mont-Saint-Michel**	Moulin Tour	1770	CFPPHR (in French); Moulins-a-Vent (in French)	
Connantre	**Moulin de Connantre**	Moulin Tour		Moulins-a-Vent (in French)	
Dommartin-Lettrée	**Moulin de Lettrée Dommartin**	Moulin Tour		Moulins-a-Vent (in French)	
Montbré	Moulin du Mont Thibé	Moulin Tour		Ruin; Moulins-a-Vent (in French)	
Saint-Memmie	**Moulin Picot**	Moulin Tour	17th century	CFPPHR (in French); Moulins-a-Vent (in French)	
Valmy	**Moulin de Valmy**	Moulin Pivot	2005	CFPPHR (in French); Moulins-a-Vent (in French)	
Verzenay	**Moulin de Verzenay**	Moulin Pivot		Moulins-a-Vent (in French)	

== Mayenne ==
Location	Name of mill	Type	Built	Notes	Photograph
Fontaine-Couverte	**Moulin des Gués**	Moulin Tour	1824	Moulins-a-Vent (in French)	
Grez-en-Bouère	**Moulin de la Grénaudière**	Moulin Cavier		Moulins-a-Vent (in French)	
Saint-Christophe-du-Luat		Moulin Tour			

== Meuse ==
Location	Name of mill	Type	Built	Notes	Photograph
Azannes-et-Soumazannes	**Moulin de Roises**	Moulin Pivot	1757	Moulins-a-Vent (in French)	

== Morbihan ==
See List of windmills in Morbihan.

== Nièvre ==
Location	Name of mill	Type	Built	Notes	Photograph
Bouhy	**Moulin du Blot**	Moulin Tour	1800s	Moulins-a-Vent (in French)	
Bouhy	**Moulin Plancon**; **Moulin du Job**	Moulin Tour		Moulins-a-Vent (in French)	
Entrains-sur-Nohain	**Moulin de Entrains sur Nohain**	Moulin Tour	1828	Moulins-a-Vent	
Livry	Moulin a Livry	Moulin Tour		Moulins-a-Vent (in French)	
Livry	Moulin a Livry	Moulin Tour		Stump, house conversion Moulins-a-Vent (in French)	
Nevers	**Moulin Goguin**	Moulin Tour		CFPPHR (in French); Moulins-a-Vent (in French)	
Nevers	**Moulin Piliers**	Moulin Tour		CFPPHR (in French); Moulins-a-Vent (in French)	
Temponelle, Saint-Benin-d'Azy	**Moulin du Saint-Benin-d'Azy**; **Moulin de la Chaume**	Moulin Tour		CFPPHR (in French); Moulins-a-Vent (in French)	
Saint-Parize-le-Châtel	**Moulin de Moiry**	Moulin Tour		Moulins-a-Vent (in French)	
Saint-Parize-le-Châtel	Moulin a vent			Moulins-a-Vent (in French)	
Saint-Pierre-le-Moûtier	**Moulin des Eventées**	Moulin Tour		Moulin Les Eventées (in French); Moulins-a-Vent (in French)	
Saint-Pierre-le-Môutier	**Moulin de Saint Pierre le Môutier**	Moulin Tour		Moulins-a-Vent (in French)	

== Nord ==
See List of windmills in Nord.

== Oise ==
Location	Name of mill	Type	Built	Notes	Photograph
Chamant	**Moulin de Chamant**	Moulin Tour		Moulins-a-Vent (in French)	
Compiègne		Moulin Pivot			
Elincourt-Sainte-Marguerite	**Moulin d'Elincourt Ste Marguerite**	Moulin Tour		Moulins-a-Vent (in French)	
Fouilleuse	**Moulin de Fouillesse**	Moulin Tour	1672	Moulins-a-Vent (in French)	
Grandvillers-aux-Bois	**Moulin de Grandvillers aux Bois**	Moulin Tour		Moulins-a-Vent (in French)	
Grez	**Moulin Delaplace**; **Moulin de Pierre**	Moulin Tour	1660	Moulins-a-Vent (in French)	
Pont-Sainte-Maxence	**Moulin de Pont Ste Maxence**	Moulin Tour		Moulins-a-Vent (in French)	

== Pas-de-Calais ==
See List of windmills in Pas-de-Calais.

== Pyrénées-Orientales ==
Location	Name of mill	Type	Built	Notes	Photograph
	Canet-en-Roussillon		Moulin Tour		
Caramany		Moulin Tour			
Collioure	**Moulin de la Colline de Pams**	Moulin Tour	1340	Moulins-a-Vent (in French)	
Vingrau		Moulin Tour			

== Rhône ==
Location	Name of mill	Type	Built	Notes	Photograph
Fleurie		Moulin Tour			
Lyon		Moulin Tour		Standing in 1793	
Poleymieux-au-Mont-d'Or		Moulin Tour		Ruin	

== Saône-et-Loire ==
Location	Name of mill	Type	Built	Notes	Photograph
Givry	**Moulin du Cellier aux Moines**	Moulin Tour	12th century	Moulins-a-Vent (in French)	
Jambles	**Moulin de Charnailles**	Moulin Tour		Moulins-a-Vent (in French)	
Mercurey	Moulin de Mercurey				
Romanèche-Thorins	**Moulin de Romanèche-Thorins**	Moulin Tour	1813	Moulins-a-Vent (in French)	
Saint-Clément-sur-Guye	Moulin Billebaud				
Saint-Désert	**Moulin de Renache**	Moulin Tour		Moulins-a-Vent (in French)	

== Sarthe ==
Location	Name of mill	Type	Built	Notes	Photograph
Allières-Beauvoir	Moulin d'Allières; Moulin de l'Epine				
Crannes-en-Champagne	Moulin de Crannes en Champagne				
Crissé	Moulin de l'Hôpital				
Crissé	Moulin du Château				
La Milesse	Moulin de Montaillé				
Neuvillalais	Moulin de Théval				
Précigné	Moulin de la Vairie				
Sablé-sur-Sarthe	Moulin du Petit Molancé				
Sillé-le-Philippe	Moulin de Beauregard				

== Savoie ==
Location	Name of mill	Type	Built	Notes	Photograph
La Rivière-Enverse	**Moulin de Vagny**	Moulin Tour en Bois		Moulins-a-Vent (in French)	

== Seine ==
Location	Name of mill	Type	Built	Notes	Photograph
Montmartre, Paris.	**Moulin de la Galette**	Moulin Pivot			
Paris	**Moulin Radet**	Moulin Pivot	1529	Moulins-a-Vent (in French)	
Paris	**Moulin Rouge**	Moulin Tour			
Paris	**Moulin Le Blute Fin**	Moulin Pivot		Moulins-a-Vent (in French)	
Montparnasse, Paris	**Moulin de la Charité**	Moulin Tour	12th century	CFPPHR (in French); Moulins-a-Vent (in French)	
Paris	Moulin de Longchamp; Moulin de Bagatelle	Moulin Tour	19th century	Moulins-a-Vent (in French)	

== Seine et Marne ==
Location	Name of mill	Type	Built	Notes	Photograph
Gastins	**Moulin de Choix**	Moulin Tour	1668	Moulins-a-Vent (in French)	
Jossigny	**Moulin de Belle Assise**	Moulin Tour	c. 1490	Moulins-a-Vent (in French)	

== Seine-Maritime ==
Location	Name of mill	Type	Built	Notes	Photograph
Haudricourt	Moulin de Pierre	Moulin Tour		Base only Moulins-a-Vent (in French)	
Mélamare	Moulin Patey				

== Seine-Saint-Denis ==
Location	Name of mill	Type	Built	Notes	Photograph
Montfermeil	**Sempin Windmill**	Moulin Tour	1740	Moulins-a-Vent (in French)	
Montfermeil	Moulin de la Galette	Moulin Tour		Standing c. 1900	

== Somme ==
See List of windmills in Somme.

== Tarn ==
Location	Name of mill	Type	Built	Notes	Photograph
Lautrec	**Moulin de la Salette**	Moulin Tour	1688	Moulins-a-Vent (in French)	
Salvagnac	**Moulin de Saint Angel**	Moulin Tour	18th century	Moulins-a-Vent (in French)	
Viviers-lès-Montagnes		Moulin Tour			

== Tarn-et-Garonne ==
Location	Name of mill	Type	Built	Notes	Photograph
Aucamville	Moulin a Aucamville	Moulin Tour		Moulins-a-Vent (in French)	
Bagor-en-Quercy	Moulin de Bagor en Quercy				
Bardigues	Moulin du Château et la Motte				
Bouillac	**Moulin a Bouillac**	Moulin Tour		Moulins-a-Vent (in French)	
Bouloc	**Moulin a Bouloc**	Moulin Tour		Moulins-a-Vent (in French)	
Gariès	Moulin de Gariès				
Gasques	Moulin d'Autevillar	Moulin Tour		Moulins-a-Vent (in French)	
Gasques	Moulin du Camp del Fraysse	Moulin Tour		Moulins-a-Vent (in French)	
Lachapelle	**Moulin de Canté Prierdri**	Moulin Tour		Moulins-a-Vent (in French)	
Montaigu-de-Quercy	Moulin de Couloussac				
Savenès	Moulin de Saubia	Moulin Tour	1679	Moulins-a-Vent (in French)	
Savenès	**Moulin de Fourcaran**	Moulin Tour	19th century	Moulins-a-Vent (in French)	
Saint-Projet	Moulin de Saillagol				
Verdun-sur-Garonne	**Moulin de Notre Dame**	Moulin Tour		Moulins-a-Vent (in French)	

== Val-de-Marne ==
Location	Name of mill	Type	Built	Notes	Photograph
Ivry-sur-Seine	**Moulin de la Tour d'Ivry**	Moulin Tour		CFPPHR (in French)	

== Val-d'Oise ==
Location	Name of mill	Type	Built	Notes	Photograph
Argenteuil	**Moulin d'Orgremont**	Moulin Tour		Moulins-a-Vent (in French)	
Argenteuil	**Moulin de la tour Billy**	Moulin Tour	16th century	Moulins-a-Vent (in French)	
Argenteuil		Moulin Pivot			
Cergy	**Moulin de Saint Pierre**	Moulin Tour	Late 17th century	Moulins-a-Vent (in French)	
Sannois	**Moulin du Montrouillet**; **Moulin Vert**; **Moulin de la Galette**	Moulin Pivot	1759	Moulins-a-Vent (in French)	
Saint-Witz	**Moulin du Grand Wy**; **Moulin de Montméliand**	Moulin Tour		Moulins-a-Vent (in French)	

== Var ==
Location	Name of mill	Type	Built	Notes	Photograph
Callas	Moulin de Callas	Moulin Tour		Moulins-a-Vent (in French)	
Collobrières	Moulin du Collet				
Gassin	Moulin Brulat	Moulin Tour		Moulins-a-Vent (in French)	
Gassin	Moulin de Verdagne			Moulins-a-Vent (in French)	
Grimaud	**Moulin de Saint-Roch**	Moulin Tour	18th century	Moulins-a-Vent (in French)	
Le Beausset	**Moulin du Bussot**	Moulin Tour		Moulins-a-Vent (in French)	
Porquerolles	**Moulin de Porquerolles**	Moulin Tour			
Ramatuelle	**Moulin de Paillas**	Moulin Tour	16th century	Moulins-a-Vent (in French)	
Ramatuelle	Moulin de Paillas #2	Moulin Tour	16th century	Ruin; Moulins-a-Vent (in French)	
Ramatuelle	Moulin de Paillas #3	Moulin Tour	16th century	Ruin; Moulins-a-Vent (in French)	
Régusse	Moulins de la Gaieté	Moulin Tour		Two mills, one with sails, one without. Moulins-a-Vent (in French)	
Rians	Moulins de Rians			Two mills	
Saint-Julien	Moulins de St Julien			Two mills	

== Vaucluse ==
Location	Name of mill	Type	Built	Notes	Photograph
Apt	Moulin de Salignan	Moulin Tour		Moulins-a-Vent (in French)	
Avignon	Two mills			Standing in 1630	
Cadenet		Moulin Tour			
Gignac	Moulin de Gignac	Moulin Tour		Moulins-a-Vent (in French)	
Gordes	**Moulin de l'Auro**	Moulin Tour		Above the village, on the road to Murs; No sails	
Gordes	Windmill (no official name)	Moulin Tour		Located above the village, on the road to Murs, before the "exit town" panel No sails	
Gordes	**Moulin des Beaumes**	Moulin Tour		Located close to the village, at west Extended / incorporated in a house in the end of the 20th century No sails Moulins-a-Vent (in French)	
Gordes	**Moulin du Picordon**	Moulin Tour		At south from the village, near the hamlet of "les Gros"; No sails Moulins-a-Vent (in French)	
Gordes	Windmill (no official name)	Moulin Tour		Located between the hamlets of "les Gervais" and "les Pourquiers"; No sails Moulins-a-Vent (in French)	
Gordes	The windmill of **Le Moulin des Roberts**	Moulin Tour		Located in the valley of Gordes, close to Goult; No sails Moulins-a-Vent (in French)	
Gordes	**Moulin des Gros**	Moulin Tour		Located at south from the village, in the hamlet of "les Gros"; No sails Moulins-a-Vent (in French)	
Goult	**Moulin de Jérusalem**	Moulin Tour		Located at the top of the village, still has sails Moulins-a-Vent (in French)	
Loumarin	Moulin de Loumarin				
Méthamis	Moulin de Méthamis	Moulin Tour			
Peypin-d'Aigues	Moulin de St Jérôme				
Rustrel	Moulin de Rustrel	Moulin Tour		Moulins-a-Vent (in French)	
Sault	**Moulin des Aires**	Moulin Tour		Moulins-a-Vent (in French)	
Saint-Pantaléon	Moulin de la Badelle	Moulin Tour		Still has sails Moulins-a-Vent (in French)	
Saint-Saturnin-les-Apt	**Moulin des Bassacs**	Moulin Tour		Restored; Moulins-a-Vent (in French)	
Saint-Saturnin-les-Apt	**Moulin des Bassacs**	Moulin Tour		Tower, no cap Moulins-a-Vent (in French)	
Saint-Saturnin-les-Apt	Moulin des Bassacs	Moulin Tour		Ruin; Moulins-a-Vent (in French)	
Valréas	Moulin de Pieds Vaurias				
Valréas	Moulin d'Auro	Moulin Tour			

== Vendée ==
See List of windmills in Vendée

== Vienne ==
Location	Name of mill	Type	Built	Notes	Photograph
Ayron	**Moulin d'Ayron**	Moulin Tour		Moulins-a-Vent (in French)	
Chalais	**Moulin du Puy d'Ardanne**	Moulin Cavier		Moulins-a-Vent (in French)	
Château-Larcher		Moulin Tour			
Cherves	**Moulin Tol**	Moulin Tour		Moulins-a-Vent (in French)	
Chiré-en-Montreuil	Moulins de Chiré en Montreuil	Moulin Tour		Two mills Moulins-a-Vent (in French)	
Chouppes	**Moulin de Chouppes**	Moulin Tour		Moulins-a-Vent (in French)	
Les-Trois-Moutiers	**Moulin du Gué Ste Marie**	Moulin Tour	19th century	Moulins-a-Vent (in French)	
Saint-Jean-de-Sauves	**Moulin Bellien**	Moulin Tour		Moulins-a-Vent (in French)	

== Yonne ==
Location	Name of mill	Type	Built	Notes	Photograph
Civry-sur-Serein	**Moulin de Civry**	Moulin Tour		Moulins-a-Vent (in French)	
Étais-la-Sauvin	**Moulin de la Galarderie**	Moulin Tour		Moulins-a-Vent (in French)	
Étais-la-Sauvin	**Moulin Bizet**	Moulin Tour		Moulins-a-Vent (in French)	
La Postolle		Éolienne Bollée			
Migé	Moulin Dautin	Moulin Tour	1794	CFPPHR (in French); Moulins-a-Vent (in French)	
Pesselières	Moulin Dare-Dare	Moulin Pivot		Destroyed 1908	
Saint-Georges-sur-Baulche	Moulin de Moreau				
Taingy		Moulin Tour			

== Yvelines ==
Location	Name of mill	Type	Built	Notes	Photograph
Bourdonné		Moulin Tour			
Guyancourt	Moulin du Val				
Les Mureaux	Moulin de Les Mureaux				
Limay	**Moulin au Rond Point**	Moulin Tour			
Orsonville	**Moulin d'Orsonville**	Moulin Tour		Moulins-a-Vent (in French)	
Versailles		Moulin Tour			

== Sources ==
- Azema, Jean-Pierre (1999). Les Moulins de France. Rennes: Fédération Française des Amis des Moulins. ISBN 2-7373-1673-1.
- Moulins-a-Vent (in French)
