= List of windmills in Côtes-d'Armor =

A list of windmills in Côtes-d'Armor, Brittany, France.

Location	Name of mill	Type	Built	Notes	Photograph
Andel	Moulin de Bourg	Moulin Tour		Moulins-a-Vent (in French)	
Corseul	Moulin de la Ville-Rault	Moulin Tour			
Étables-sur-Mer	Moulin Merlet	Moulin Tour			
Hénansal	Moulin Le Verger	Moulin Tour		Moulins-a-Vent (in French)	
Hillion	Moulin de Bel Air; Moulin de Lesillion	Moulin Tour		Moulins-a-Vent (in French)	
Île-de-Bréhat	Moulin de Krec'h Ar Pot	Moulin Tour		Moulins-a-Vent (in French)	
Île-de-Bréhat	Moulin de Krec'h Tarek	Moulin Tour		Moulins-a-Vent (in French)	
Jugon-les-Lacs	Moulin de Jugon les Lacs	Moulin Tour		Moulins-a-Vent (in French)	
La Clarté	Moulin du Crach de la Lande	Moulin Tour	1927	Moulins-a-Vent (in French)	
Lamballe	Moulin de Saint-Lazare	Moulin Tour		Moulins-a-Vent (in French)	
Lamballe	Moulin de Quefféron	Moulin Tour		Moulins-a-Vent (in French)	
Lancieux	Moulin des Bénédictins; Moulin de Buglais	Moulin Tour		Moulins-a-Vent (in French)	
Langrolay-sur-Rance	Moulin des Rochettes	Moulin Tour			
Lanmodez		Moulin Tour		Ruin	
Lanmodez	Moulin de Keraniou	Moulin Tour			
Léhon-Dinan	Moulin des Bas Foins; Moulin Cassepot; Moulin de l'Hôpital	Moulin Tour		Moulins-a-Vent (in French)	
Pléneuf-Val-André	Moulin du Tertre Oro	Moulin Tour		Moulins-a-Vent (in French)	
Ploubazlanec	Moulin de Gonerec	Moulin Tour		Moulins-a-Vent (in French)	
Ploubazlanec	Moulin à Kerpalud	Moulin Tour		Moulins-a-Vent (in French)	
Plouézec	Moulin de Craca	Moulin Tour	1842	Moulins-a-Vent (in French)	
Plouézec	Moulin du Mez	Moulin Tour		1:20 Scale model Moulins-a-Vent (in French)	
Ploulec'h	Moulin de Crec'h Olen	Moulin Tour		Moulins-a-Vent (in French)	
Plourhan	Moulin de Plourhan	Moulin Tour		Moulins-a-Vent (in French)	
Saint-Jacut-de-la-Mer		Moulin Tour			
Saint-Quay-Portrieux	Moulin de Merlet	Moulin Tour	1823	Moulins-a-Vent (in French)	
Saint-Quay-Portrieux	Moulin Saint Michel	Moulin Tour			
Saint-Cast-le-Guildo	Moulin de Billy				
Saint-Cast-le-Guildo	Moulin de St Eniguet	Moulin Tour		Moulins-a-Vent (in French)	
Saint-Cast-le-Guildo	Moulin du Bay				
Saint-Cast-le-Guildo	Moulin d'Anne	Moulin Tour			
