= List of windmills in Finistère =

A list of windmills in Finistère, France.

Location	Name of mill	Type	Built	Notes	Photograph
Audierne	Moulin de la Garenne				
Beuzec-Cap-Sizun	Moulin Meil Dominic; Moulin de Kérouan	Moulin Tour			
Cléden-Cap-Sizun	Moulin de Kériolet	Moulin Tour		Moulins-a-Vent (in French)	
Cléden-Cap-Sizun	Moulin de Kerbesquerrien	Moulin Tour		Moulins-a-Vent (in French)	
Cléden-Cap-Sizun	Moulin de Kertanguy	Moulin Tour		Moulins-a-Vent (in French)	
Clohars-Carnoët	Moulin de Kercousquet	Moulin Tour	1535	Moulins-a-Vent (in French)	
Clohars-Carnoët	Moulin de Kerangoff				
Clohars-Carnoët	Moulin de Kerc'Héré				
Clohars-Carnoët	Moulin de Keranquernat	Moulin Tour			
Commana	Moulin du village de Kerouat	Moulin Chandelier		Moulins-a-Vent (in French)	
Crozon	Moulin de Menesguen	Moulin Tour		Moulins-a-Vent (in French)	
Crozon	Moulin de Rostudel	Moulin Tour		Moulins-a-Vent (in French)	
Crozon	Moulin de Kergonan	Moulin Tour		Moulins-a-Vent (in French)	
Esquibien	Moulin de Kéraudiern				
Esquibien	Moulin de Kérhuon		Destroyed in 1936, replaced by a house rue tal ar groaz. The stones of the moulin are still visible at the entrance of the house.		
Goulien	Moulin de Kergonvan				
Île de Batz		Moulin Tour			
Île de Sein	Moulin Ar'Milh				
Île de Ouessant	Moulin de Karaes	Moulin Chandelier			
Île de Ouessant	Moulin de Run-Glaz	Moulin Chandelier			
Île de Ouessant		Moulin Chandelier		Three mills, destroyed between 1926 and 1939	
Île de Sein	Moulin du Nifran	Moulin Tour			
Île-Molène		Moulin Tour			
Locmaria-Plouzané	Moulin de Ruvras	Moulin Tour			
Penmarch	Moulin de Kérity	Moulin Tour		Moulins-a-Vent (in French)	
Penmarch	Moulin de Kervily	Moulin Tour			
Plogoff	Moulin de Plogoff	Moulin Tour		Moulins-a-Vent (in French)	
Plomeur	Moulin de Pendreff	Moulin Tour			
Plouhinec	Moulin de Plouhinec				
Pouldreuzic	Moulin de Pouldreuzic				
Primelin	Moulin à Kerforn	Moulin Tour		Moulins-a-Vent (in French)	
Telgruc-sur-Mer	'Moulin de Luzeoc	Moulin Tour			
Trouguer	Moulin Kandelou	Moulin Chandelier			
