= Alexandre-Joseph de Boisgelin =

French military officer and politician

Deputy and Peer de France Alexandre Joseph Gabriel Marquis de Boisgelin
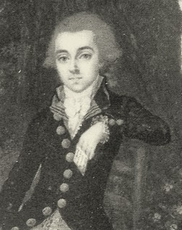
- The Marquis during early life wearing the badge of the Royal and Military Order of Saint Louis on his left breast.

Member of the Chamber of Peers for Seine
- In office 22 August 1815 – 4 October 1816

Member of the Chamber of Peers for Ille-et-Vilaine
- In office 20 September 1817 – 29 July 1830

Personal details
- Born: 14 April 1770 Pléhédel, Kingdom of France
- Died: 21 June 1831 (aged 61) Paris, Kingdom of France
- Party: Ultra Royalists
- Awards: Commander of the Royal Order of the Légion d'Honneur (18 May 1820); Peer de France (18 May 1820); Chevalier of the Royal and Military Order of Saint Louis (1784); Chevalier of the Order of Malta (1784)

Military service
- Allegiance: Kingdom of France; Kingdom of France
- Branch/service: (Kingdom of France) Armée Royale; Armée des Émigrés; Armée Royale
- Years of service: 1789–1815; 1818–1830?
- Rank: Maréchal de Camp
- Unit: Paris Garde Nationale; Garde du Corps du Roi
- Battles/wars: French Revolutionary Wars

Alexandre Joseph Gabriel, Marquis de Boisgelin (14 April 1770 – 21 June 1821) was a French nobleman who served as personal bodyguard to the last Queen of France before emigrating. He later served with the French Émigrés till 1814 when he returned to France. Following the Second Restoration, he became a politician and served two separate departments before retiring after the July Revolution and passing one year later.

== Early life ==
Son of Charles Eugène, Comte de Boisgelin, Vicomte de Pléhédel and younger brother of Bruno Gabriel de Boisgel, Alexandre de Boisgelin was a French officer who served in the Royal French Army. He was born in Pléhédel, part of the province of Brittany.

In 1789, just prior to the French Revolution, Alexandre was a Captain and personal bodyguard of the Queen, Marie Antoinette. In 1792, following the Storming of the Tuileries, he emigrated east to fight with the Army of the Princes, and then served in the British Army.

== Restoration ==
Following the First Bourbon Restoration in 1814, he was invited back to France where he was appointed Commander of the 10th Legion, Paris National Guard. After the return of Napoleon from Elba in early 1815, he emigrated once again, refusing to serve under Napoleon. He flees with King Louis XVIII and his court to Ghent in the United Kingdom of the Netherlands.

On 22 August 1815, he was elected as a member of the Chamber of Peers representing the Seine department, encompassing Paris and some of its suburbs. He loses his seat in the 1816 elections, but is re-elected to the Chamber of Peers on 20 September 1817, representing the Ille-et-Vilaine department. From this point on he becomes a dedicated Ultra-royalist, sitting with the far right of the party.

On 20 April 1818, he was commissioned as a Lieutenant within the Garde du Corps du Roi (King's Life Guards), and was raised to the rank of Maréchal de Camp _{(equivalent to that of Brigadier general in the Anglophone world)} later that day.

Following the death of his eldest brother Bruno, Alexandre succeeds to the titles which had been held by the former and was admitted to succeed him in the Chamber of Peers. On 19 May 1827 under the Royal Ordnance of 1 August 1817, his peerage was transferred to the collateral line. However, following the July Revolution of 1830 he retired from political life.

Just one year later, on 21 June 1831, he died at the age of 61 with his titles passing to his one son, Édouard Raymond Marie, 3ème Marquis de Boisgelin.
