= Audierne =

Audierne Gwaien
- Commune
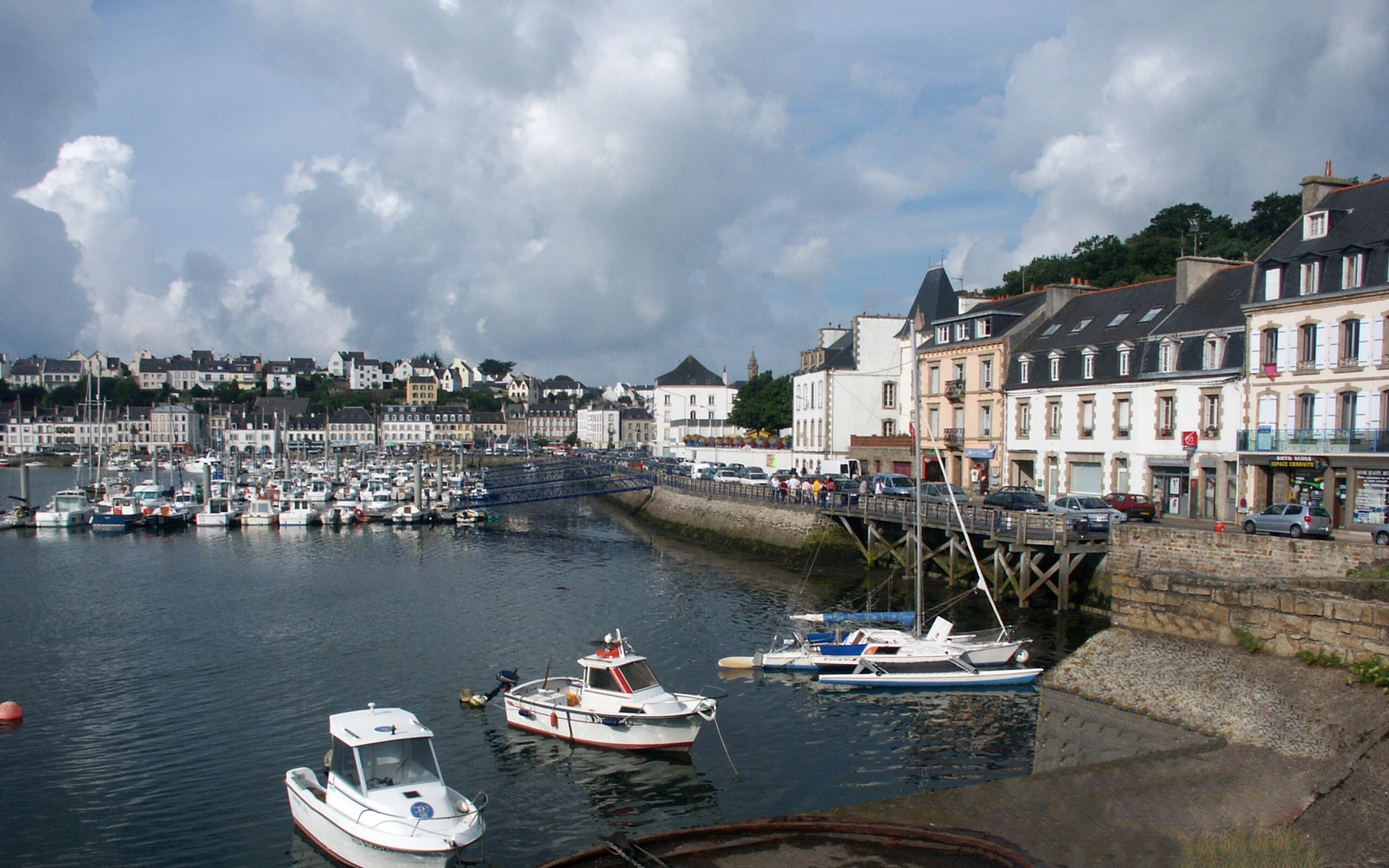
- Audierne harbour

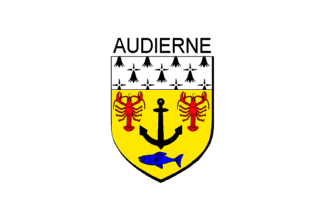
- Flag Coat of arms
- Location of Audierne
- Location within France Location within Brittany
- Coordinates: 48°01′30″N 4°32′26″W
- Country: France
- Region: Brittany
- Department: Finistère
- Arrondissement: Quimper
- Canton: Douarnenez
- Intercommunality: Cap Sizun-Pointe du Raz

Government
  - Mayor (2020–2026): Gurvan Kerloc'h
- Area^{1}: 18.37 km^{2} (7.09 sq mi)
- Population (2023): 3,727
  - Density: 202.9/km^{2} (525.5/sq mi)
- Time zone: UTC+01:00 (CET)
  - Summer (DST): UTC+02:00 (CEST)
- INSEE/Postal code: 29003 /29770
- Website: www.audierne.fr
- ^{1} French Land Register data, which excludes lakes, ponds, glaciers > 1 km^{2} (0.386 sq mi or 247 acres) and river estuaries.

Audierne (French pronunciation: [odjɛʁn]; Breton: Gwaien) is a commune in the Finistère department of Brittany in northwestern France. On 1 January 2016 the former commune of Esquibien merged into Audierne.

The town lies on a peninsula at the mouth of the Goyen river and for centuries was a fishing village, with a wide sandy beach. Visitors can take a boat from Audierne's port of Esquibien to the Île de Sein.

The harbour, formerly important to the local fishing industry, is now essentially a yacht port. Remaining of the fishery is an oyster farm, in which the delicacy can be bought. Along the harbour stretches the town's main shopping area with its cafés, bars and restaurants, crêperies, boutiques, estate agents and holiday agencies, the town hall, the tourism office, and the regional bus stop. On Saturday mornings there is a farmers' market, which serves as a meeting place for natives and tourists alike.

== History ==
The battle of Audierne Bay, which took place on 23 August 1944, was an engagement between German and Allied naval flotillas. Three Allied warships, which had already established control off the coast of Brittany and were lurking off Audierne south of the invested fortress of Brest, intercepted and sank eight German vessels of an armed convoy. This was the conclusion of Operation Kinetic, which was an allied operation aimed at intercepting shipping and hindering German forces besieged at Brest.

== International relations ==
Audierne is twinned with Penryn in the United Kingdom and Hattingen in Germany.

== Population ==
Inhabitants of Audierne are called Audiernais.

Historical population
Year	Pop.	±% p.a.
1968	5,749	—
1975	5,474	−0.70%
1982	5,003	−1.28%
1990	4,657	−0.89%
1999	4,082	−1.45%
2007	3,860	−0.70%
2012	3,742	−0.62%
2017	3,692	−0.27%
2023	3,727	+0.16%
Populations of the area corresponding with the commune of Audierne at 1 January 2025. Source: INSEE

== Gallery ==
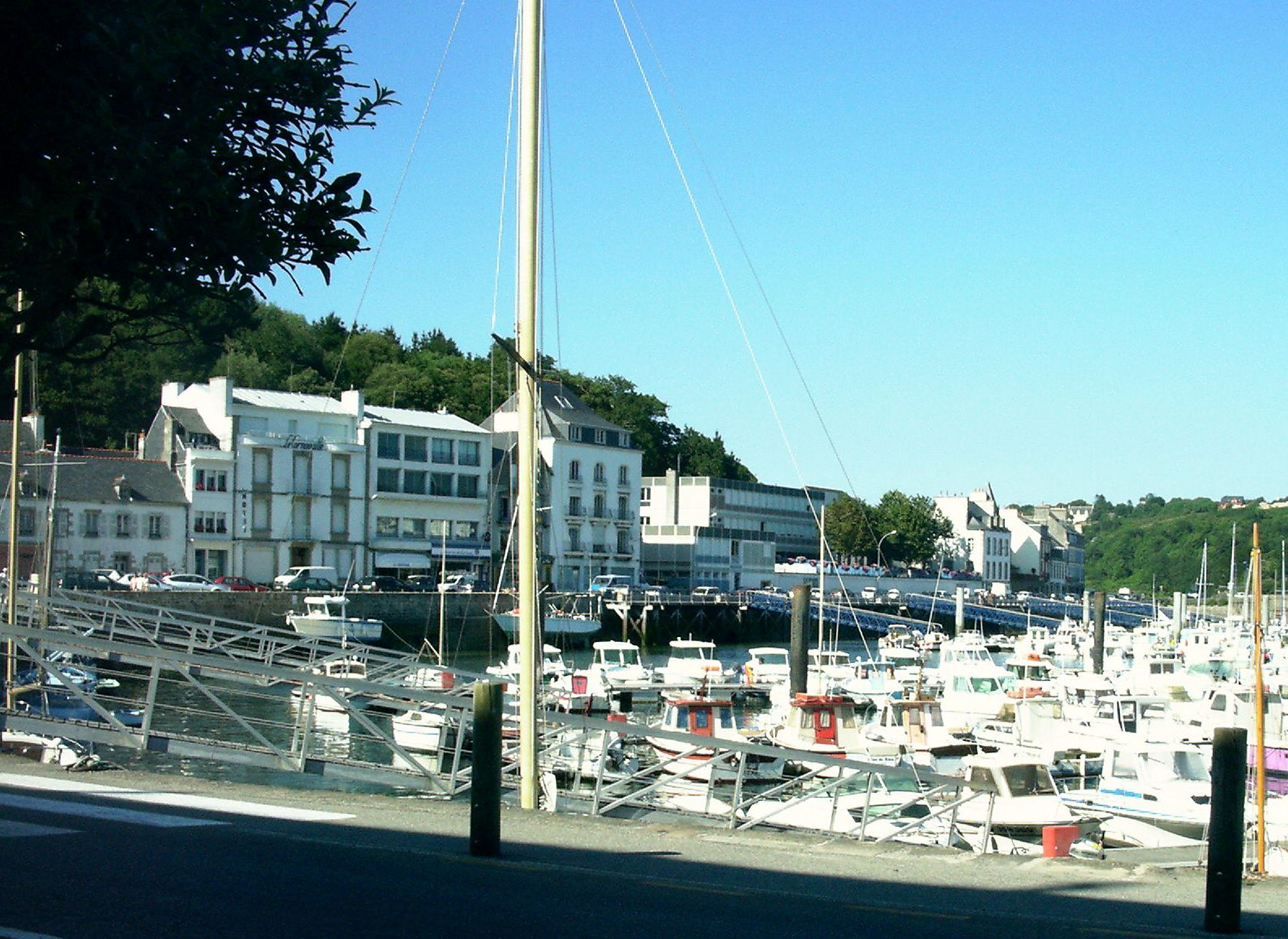
Yacht port

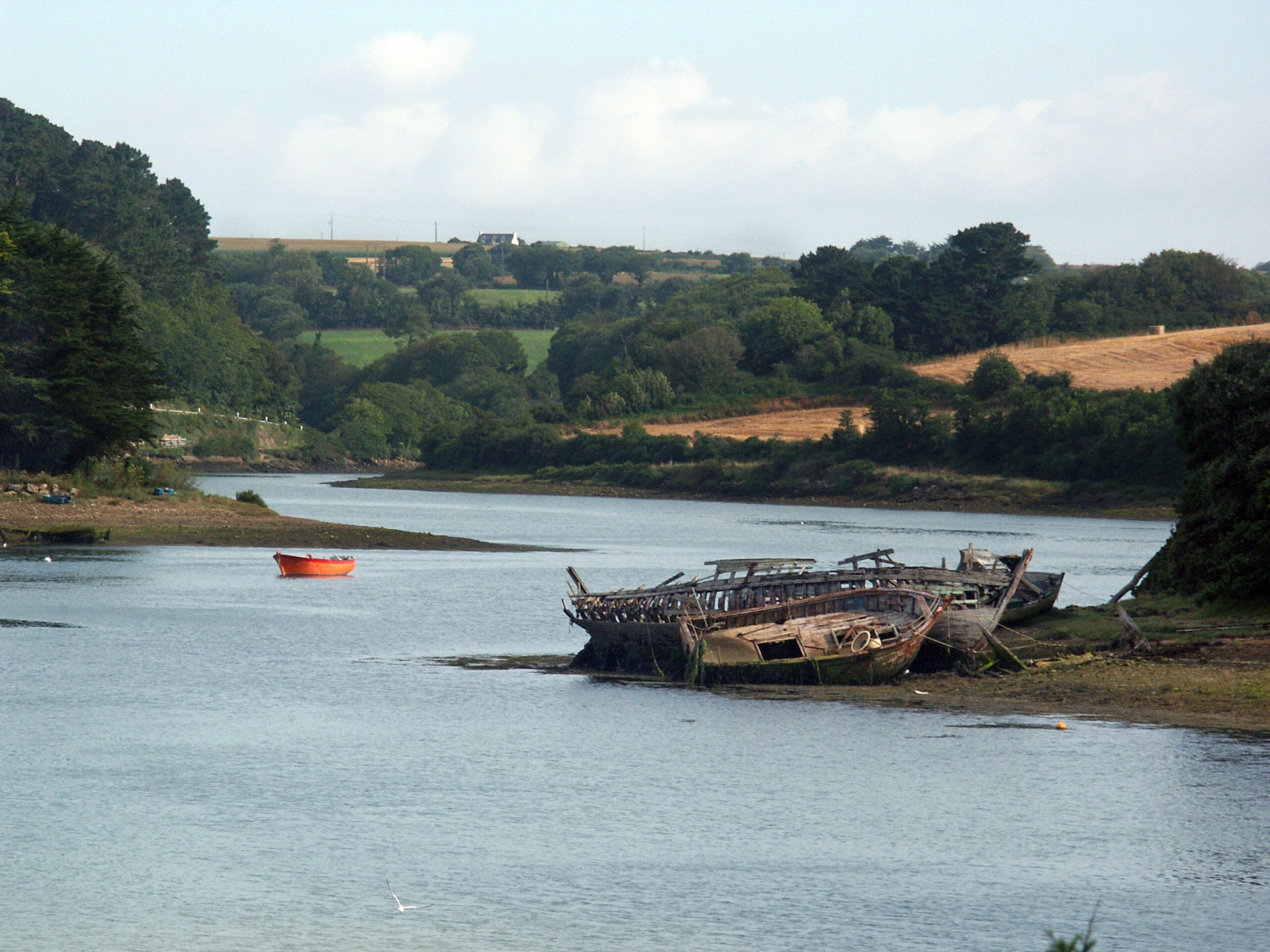
Goyen

== See also ==
- Communes of the Finistère department
