= Charles Eugène de Boisgelin =

French nobleman and naval officer

Charles Eugène Comte de Boisgelin, Vicomte de Pléhédel
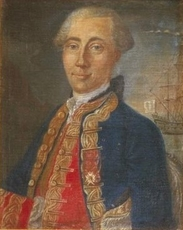
- The Comte during his time as a Frigate Captain in the Atlantic Fleet

Governor of Saint-Brieuc
- In office 1789?–1791?

Personal details
- Born: 2 August 1726 Pléhédel, Kingdom of France
- Died: 27 August 1791 (aged 65) Pléhédel, Kingdom of France

Military service
- Allegiance: Kingdom of France
- Branch/service: Marine Royale
- Rank: Captain de Frégate
- Unit: Flotte du Ponant
- Battles/wars: War of the Austrian Succession; Second Carnatic War; Seven Years' War

Charles Eugène, Comte de Boisgelin, Vicomte de Pléhédel (2 August 1726 – 27 October 1791) was a French nobleman who served in the French Royal Navy (Marine Royale) and later became a politician.

== Early life ==
Charles Eugène was born on 2 August 1726 at the Château de Boisgelin in Pléhédel, Brittany as son of René Joseph, Comte de Boisgelin.

== Service ==
After studying at the Jesuit college in La Flèche, he joined the Marine Guards (Gardes de La Marine) on 1 January 1746. During this period, he served on several ships of the line including:

- Trident, bound for Acadia, New France which had to turn back in 1746
- Sirène, commanded by Luc Urbain de Bouëxic, Comte de Guichen serving around for Saint-Domingue, French Antilles in 1747 and 1748
- Émeraude, sailing off the Kingdom of Spain and later the Kingdom of Morocco in 1749
- Junon, sailing to Lisbon, Kingdom of Portugal and later cruising off Tunis, Beylik of Tunis in 1750

In 1751, he was promoted to the rank of Ensign and then sailed on further voyages:

- Emerald, sailing to Saint-Domingue, French Antilles in 1751 and 1752
- Marie Magdeleine, training ship based the naval base in Lorient
- Anémone, sailing as far as Cayenne, French Guiana and Martinique, French Antilles in 1755 and 1756

After he returned to France, Charles took command of the coastal batteries in Morlaix and Tréguier, both in Brittany. In late 1756, he was moved back to sea, serving on the Alcyon till early 1757. In mid 1757, he was promoted to the rank of Frigate Captain (Captaine de Frégate), equivalent to that of Brigadier General/Commander in the Anglophone world. That year, he sailed on the Formidable, which was flagship of Ship of the Line Lieutenant, Louis Charles du Chaffault de Besné's squadron earmarked for Louisbourg, New France.

In 1759, Charles took command of the 32-gun Blonde-class frigate Brune, which sailed from her base in Lorient towards the naval base in Brest and witnessed the Battle of Quiberon Bay. In 1762, the ship was once again at sea grouped with the Defence and Diadème which led a long campaign in 1762 with the Marquis de Montreil bound for Saint Pierre and Newfoundland.

In 1764, Charles was promoted to Frigate Captain (Capitaine de Frégate) but retired from the navy in 1765. With the rank of Frigate Captain removed shortly after, his rank was altered to that of Naval Captain.

== Later life ==
In 1764, Charles' brother Réne Gabriel, Comte de Boisgelin, Viscomte de Pléhédel, Brigadier Colonel of the Régiment de Béarn died, and Charles subsequently took his titles and lineage over. From this point on, he would be known as the Count (Comte) of Boisgelin and Viscomte (Vicount) of Pléhédel.

On 26 August 1767, Charles and his wife bear their first son, Bruno-Gabriel de Boisgelin who will take over his fathers titles on his death in 1791.

On 14 April 1770, Charles and his wife bear their second son, Alexandre-Joseph de Boisgelin who will later take the title of Marquis de Boisgelin. The title is raised under the Second Restoration, though Alexandre-Joseph remains 2nd in succession to his older brother, until 1827.

By 1789, the Comte is appointed as Governor of Saint-Brieuc in Brittany and presides over the Order of the Nobility in Brittany from 1779, during the short absence of his brother.

On 27 October 1791, the Comte died and his eldest son, Bruno took over his titles and lands, though the title was raised to that of Marquis.
