= List of windmills in Bouches-du-Rhône =

This is a list of windmills in Bouches-du-Rhône, France.

Location	Name of mill	Type	Built	Notes	Photograph
Allauch	Moulin d'Allauch No. 1	Moulin Tour		Moulins-a-Vent (in French)	
Allauch	Moulin d'Allauch No. 2	Moulin Tour		Moulins-a-Vent (in French)	
Arles	Moulin Van Gogh; Moulin de la Crau; Moulin Tour de Jonquet	Moulin Tour			
Barbentane	Moulin de Barbentane	Moulin Tour			
Bouc-Bel-Air	Moulin de Bouc Bel Air	Moulin Tour		Moulins-a-Vent (in French)	
Bouc-Bel-Air	Moulin de Bouc Bel Air	Éolienne		Moulins-a-Vent (in French)	
Boulbon	Moulin Bonnet	Moulin Tour			
Cabriès	Moulin de Cabriès				
Château-Gombert	Moulin de la Montezane	Moulin Tour	1737	Moulins-a-Vent (in French)	
Ensuès-la-Redonne	Moulin d'Ensuès la Redonne				
Eygalières	(2 mills)	Moulin Tours			
Fontvieille	Moulin de Saint-Pierre; Moulin Daudet	Moulin Tour	1814	Moulins-a-Vent (in French)	
Fontvieille	Moulins de Rome			Two mills?)	
Fontvieille	Moulin Ramet	Moulin Tour		Moulins-a-Vent (in French)	
Fontvieille	Moulin Tissot; Moulin Avon	Moulin Tour		Moulins-a-Vent (in French)	
Fontvieille	Moulin Sourdon	Moulin Tour		Moulins-a-Vent (in French)	
Fuveau	Moulin des Forges	Moulin Tour	Converted to dovecote	Moulins-a-Vent (in French)	
Gardanne	Moulin de Cativel	Moulin Tour		Moulins-a-Vent (in French)	
Gardanne	Moulin de Gardanne	Moulin Tour		Moulins-a-Vent (in French)	
Gignac-la-Nerthe	Moulin de Gignac la Nerthe	Moulin Tour			
La Ciotat	Moulin de St Jean				
Lambesc	Moulin de Bertoire	Moulin Tour	1795–1810	Présentation (mise à jour janvier 2013) du Projet de restauration du Moulin à Vent de Bertoire sur le site de publication Calameo ou by French heritage foundation	
Le Tholonet	Moulin de Le Tholonet	Moulin Tour			
Les Baux-de-Provence	Moulin des Baux de Provence	Moulin Tour		Moulins-a-Vent (in French)	
Les Pennes-Mirabeau	Moulin de Pallières No. 1	Moulin Tour	18th century	Moulins-a-Vent (in French)	
Les Pennes-Mirabeau	Moulin de Pallières No. 2			Moulins-a-Vent (in French)	
Les Pennes-Mirabeau	Moulin de Pallières No. 3			Moulins-a-Vent (in French)	
Marseille	Moulins de la Bastide de Montgolfier			Two mills	
Martigues	Moulins de Martigues			Three mills	
Plan-de-Cuques	Moulin du Mail	Moulin Tour			
Rousset	Moulin de Rousset	Moulin Tour		Moulins-a-Vent (in French)	
Saint-Mitre-les-Remparts	Moulin de St Mitre les Remparts	Moulin Tour			
Saint-Victoret	Moulin de St Victoret				
Vauvenargues	Moulin de Vauvenargues	Moulin Tour			
Venelles	Moulin de Venelles le Haut				
Ventabren	Moulin de Ventabren	Moulin Tour		Moulins-a-Vent (in French)	
Vitrolles	Moulin des Pinchinades				

LAMBESC Moulin de Bertoire Moulin Tour

The towermill of Bertoire (13410 – Lambesc) mill built of local stone (between 1795 et 1810), with a vaulted ground floor to support the first floor and two rotating wheels and recumbent. It is located near the sports park, opposite the shopping center "Calypso"

The Association "Conservation patrimoine de Lambesc" has been founded in October 2009, which first project is to add wings to mill and grind wheat; then, the tower will become windmill. City of Lambesc, proprietary of this windmill since 1981, gave in November 2010, authorization to this project, contracting with Association "Conservation patrimoine de Lambesc". conservationpatrimoinelambesc-hotmail-fr.

Association "Conservation patrimoine de Lambesc" has contracted, in December 2010 with the "fondation du Patrimoine"(heritage foundation in France), to launch a public subscription starting in January 2011. Page de Soutien au Projet de restauration du Moulin de Bertoire

Since April 2011, work began: disbursement around the windmill, extracting the stone quarry in Lambesc of 40 coping stones followed by the size of the 40 stones in the stone-cutter's workshop), installation of scaffolding, raising of the tower wall to original height, 40 Laying coping stones.
