= Esquibien =

Esquibien An Eskevien
- Part of Audierne
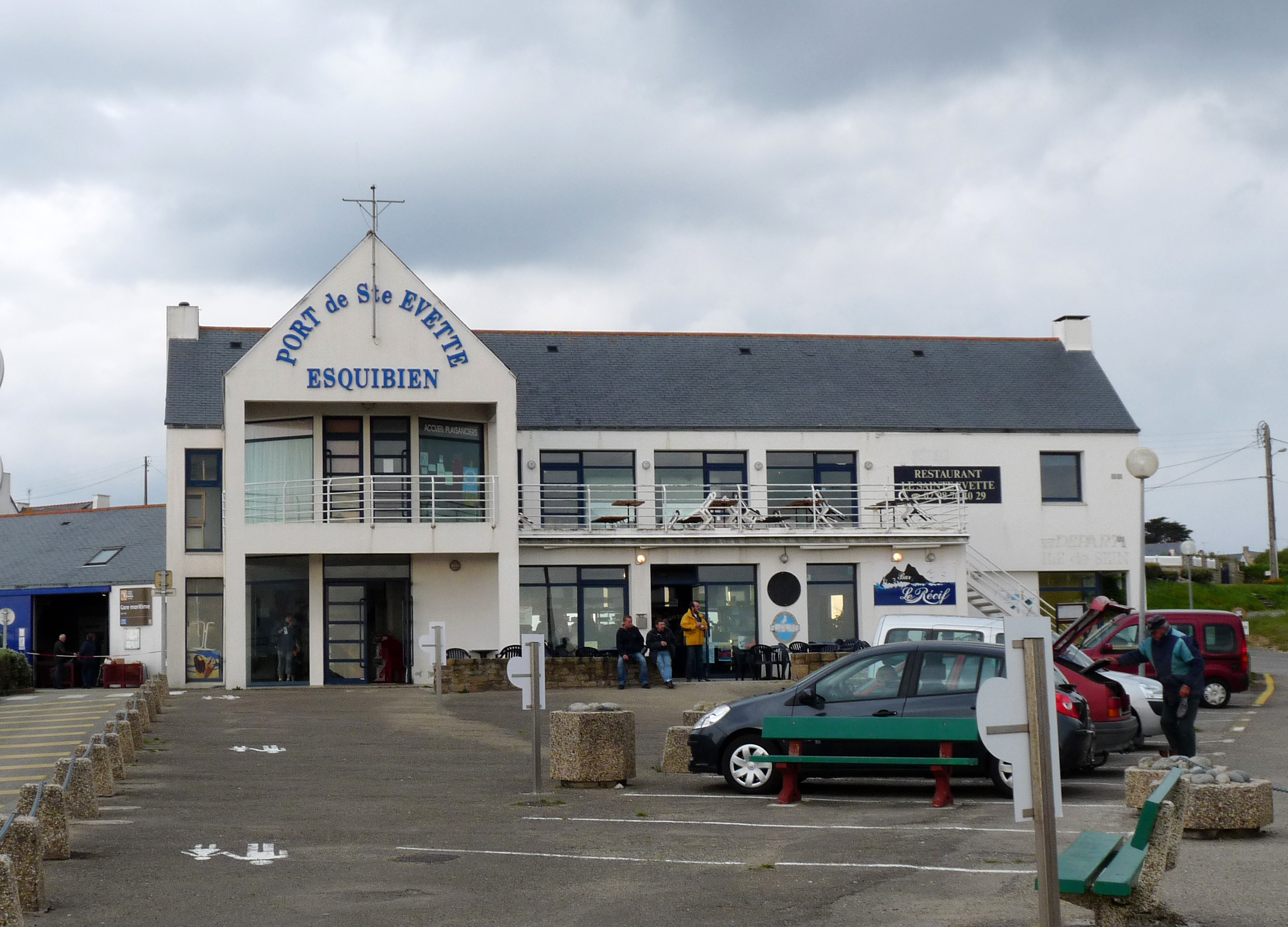
- The port of Saint Evette, which has a pier for services to the Île de Sein

- Coat of arms
- Location of Esquibien
- Location within France Location within Brittany
- Coordinates: 48°01′33″N 4°33′41″W
- Country: France
- Region: Brittany
- Department: Finistère
- Arrondissement: Quimper
- Canton: Douarnenez
- Commune: Audierne
- Area^{1}: 15.42 km^{2} (5.95 sq mi)
- Highest elevation: 79 m (259 ft)
- Lowest elevation: 0 m (0 ft)
- Population (2021): 1,541
  - Density: 99.94/km^{2} (258.8/sq mi)
- Time zone: UTC+01:00 (CET)
  - Summer (DST): UTC+02:00 (CEST)
- Postal code: 29770
- ^{1} French Land Register data, which excludes lakes, ponds, glaciers > 1 km^{2} (0.386 sq mi or 247 acres) and river estuaries.

Esquibien (French pronunciation: [ɛskibjɛ̃]; Breton: An Eskevien) is a former French commune in the Finistère department, in the Brittany region. On January 1, 2016, it became a delegated commune within the new commune of Audierne. Esquibien and Audierne thus regained the unity they had lost after the French Revolution in 1793 (Audierne had been a trève—a subordinate parish—of the parish of Esquibien).

Esquibien was part of the Cap-Sizun Community of Communes.

== Population ==
Inhabitants of Esquibien are called in French Esquibiennois.

Historical population
Year	Pop.	±% p.a.
2006	1,556	—
2011	1,598	+0.53%
2021	1,541	−0.36%
Source: INSEE

== See also ==
- Communes of the Finistère department
