= Livry, Nièvre =

Livry
- Commune
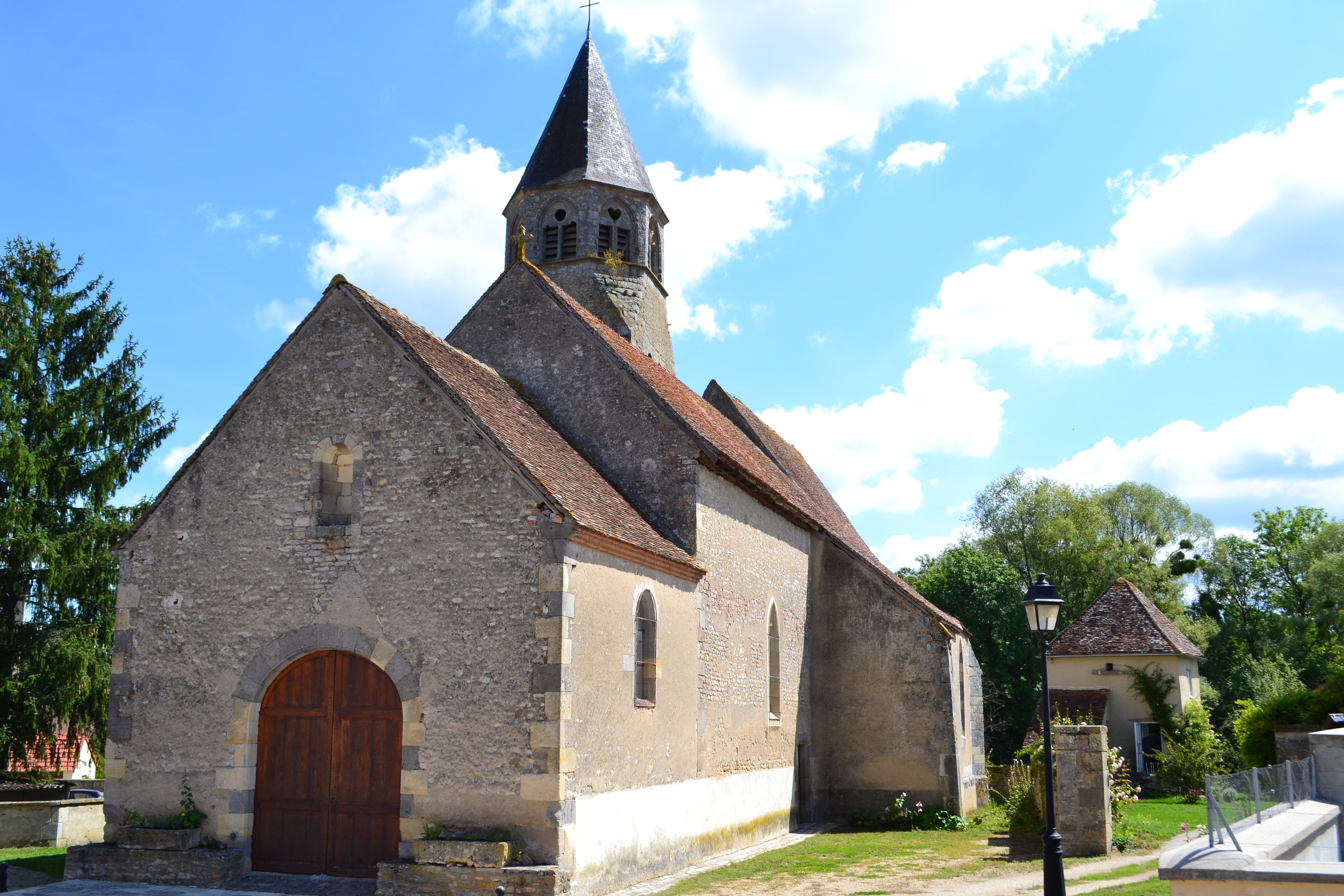
- The church in Livry
- Location of Livry
- Location within France Location within Bourgogne-Franche-Comté
- Coordinates: 46°46′32″N 3°04′27″E
- Country: France
- Region: Bourgogne-Franche-Comté
- Department: Nièvre
- Arrondissement: Nevers
- Canton: Saint-Pierre-le-Moûtier
- Intercommunality: Nivernais Bourbonnais

Government
  - Mayor (2020–2026): Adrien Aufevre
- Area^{1}: 27.62 km^{2} (10.66 sq mi)
- Highest elevation: 264 m (866 ft)
- Lowest elevation: 181 m (594 ft)
- Population (2023): 643
  - Density: 23.3/km^{2} (60.3/sq mi)
- Time zone: UTC+01:00 (CET)
  - Summer (DST): UTC+02:00 (CEST)
- INSEE/Postal code: 58144 /58240
- ^{1} French Land Register data, which excludes lakes, ponds, glaciers > 1 km^{2} (0.386 sq mi or 247 acres) and river estuaries.

Livry (French pronunciation: [livʁi]) is a commune in the Nièvre department in central France.

== See also ==
- Communes of the Nièvre department
