= Moulin de Craca =

Windmill in Plouézec, Côtes-d'Armor, France

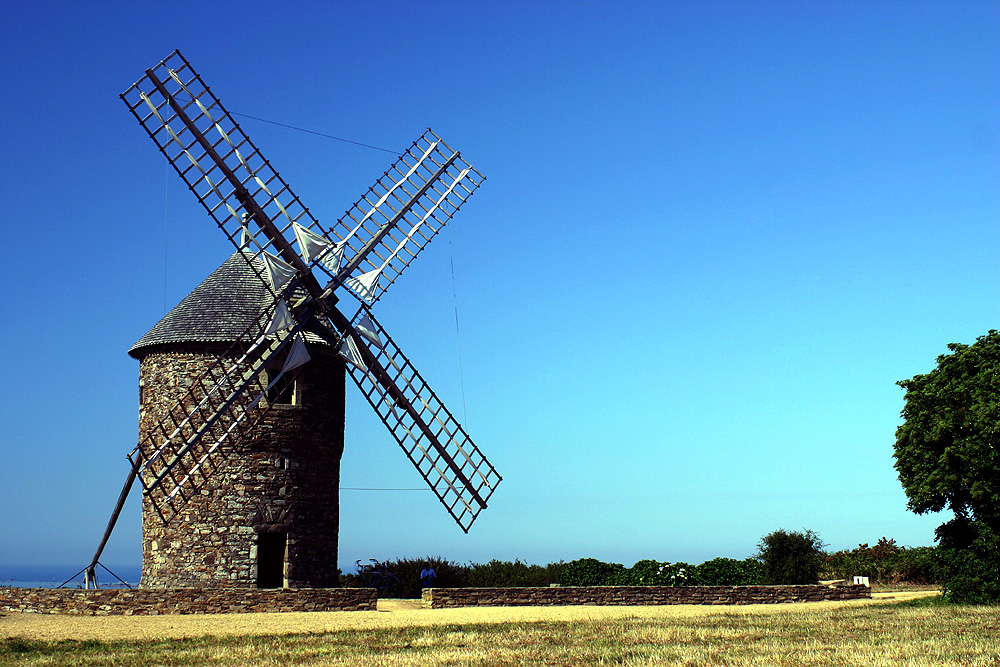
- Moulin de Craca
- Interactive map of Moulin de Craca

Origin
- Mill name: Moulin de Craca
- Mill location: Plouézec, Côtes-d'Armor
- Coordinates: 48.7608°N 2.9743°W

Information
- Purpose: Corn mill
- Type: Tower mill
- Storeys: Two storey tower
- Type of sails: Common sails
- Winding: Tailpole

Moulin de Craca is a windmill in Plouézec, Côtes-d'Armor, France. First working in 1844 it was restored from 1995. It is popular amongst both locals and tourists because of its location on top of a cliff overlooking Port Lazo.

Every August the Plouézec-Ballinamore twinning committee organises Noz Ar Vilin Fest Noz around the windmill. There is a selection of Breton and Irish music and dancing, as well as local cuisine and drinks. Amongst the specialities are Moules-Frites (Mussels and chips), Crêpes, Galettes, Breton cider, and Chouchen.

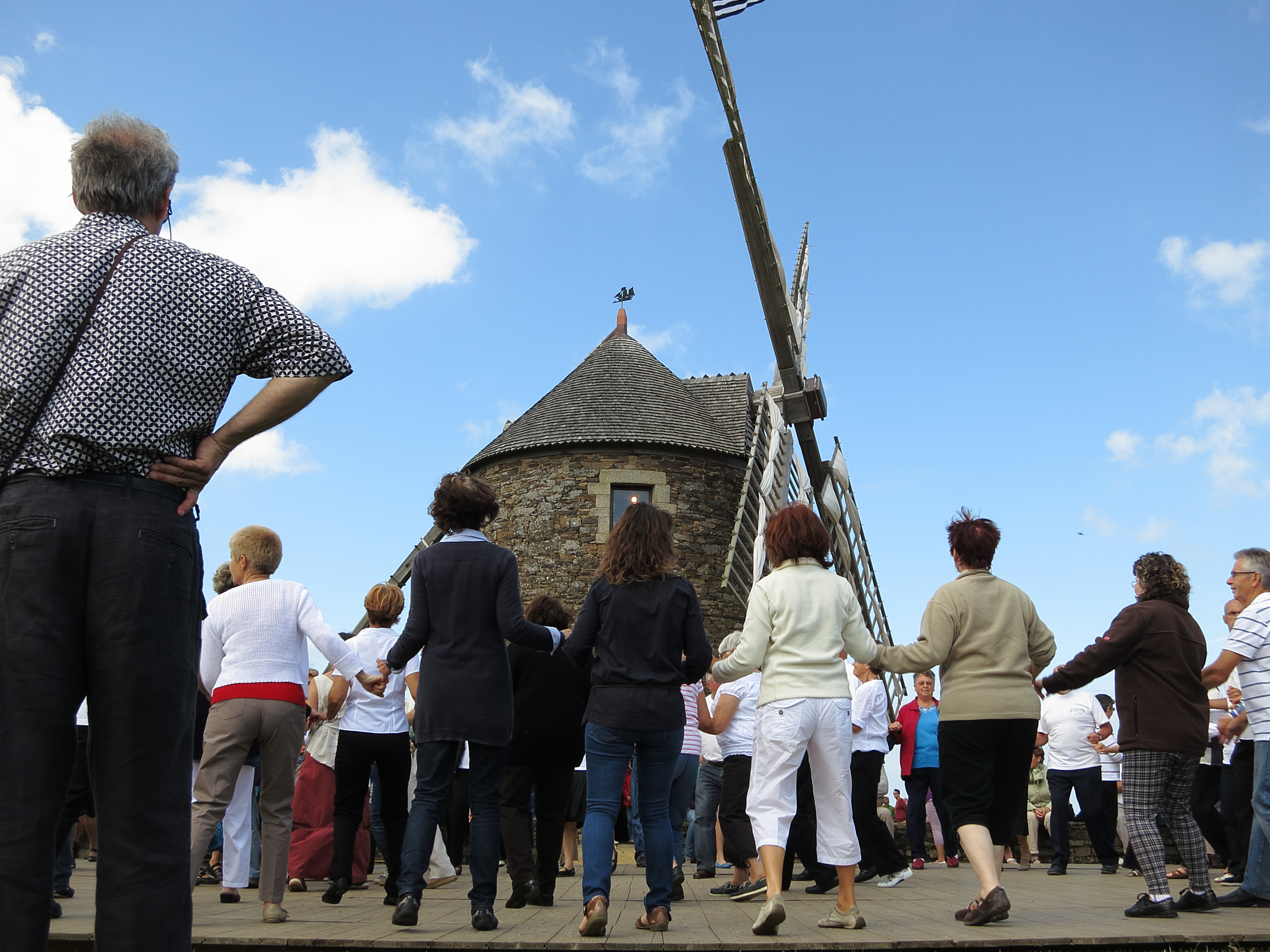
Fest-noz at the Mill of Craca

After falling into disrepair, the windmill was restored in 1993. It now contains fully operational, working replica machinery.
