= Lanleff =

Lanleff Lanleñv
- Commune
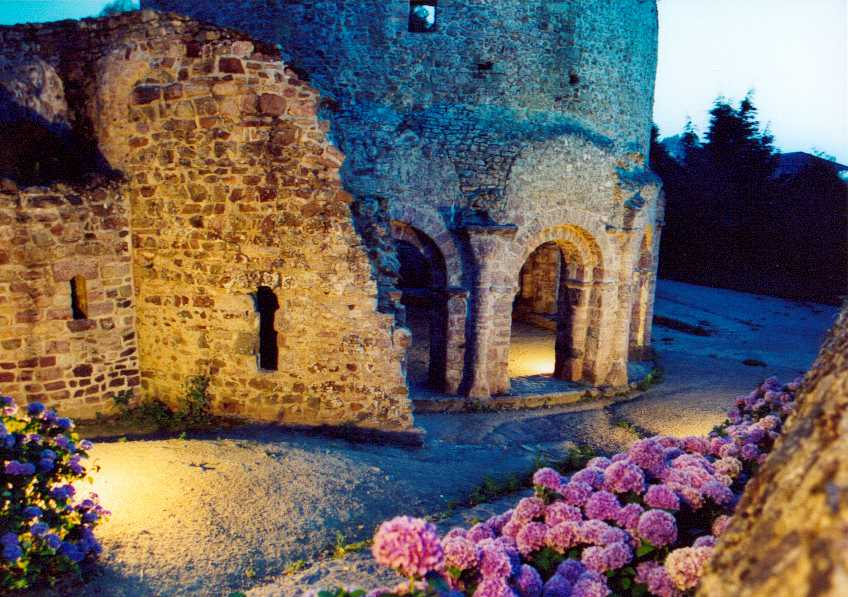
- Temple
- Location of Lanleff
- Location within France Location within Brittany
- Coordinates: 48°41′37″N 3°02′36″W
- Country: France
- Region: Brittany
- Department: Côtes-d'Armor
- Arrondissement: Guingamp
- Canton: Paimpol
- Intercommunality: Guingamp-Paimpol Agglomération

Government
  - Mayor (2020–2026): Josette Connan
- Area^{1}: 2.16 km^{2} (0.83 sq mi)
- Highest elevation: 86 m (282 ft)
- Lowest elevation: 17 m (56 ft)
- Population (2023): 121
  - Density: 56.0/km^{2} (145/sq mi)
- Time zone: UTC+01:00 (CET)
  - Summer (DST): UTC+02:00 (CEST)
- INSEE/Postal code: 22108 /22290
- ^{1} French Land Register data, which excludes lakes, ponds, glaciers > 1 km^{2} (0.386 sq mi or 247 acres) and river estuaries.

Lanleff (French pronunciation: [lɑ̃lɛf]; Breton: Lanleñv) is a commune in the Côtes-d'Armor department of Brittany in northwestern France.

== Geography ==
=== Climate ===
Lanleff has an oceanic climate (Köppen climate classification Cfb). The average annual temperature in Lanleff is 11.6 °C (52.9 °F). The average annual rainfall is 839.3 mm (33.04 in) with December as the wettest month. The temperatures are highest on average in July, at around 17.6 °C (63.7 °F), and lowest in January, at around 6.7 °C (44.1 °F). The highest temperature ever recorded in Lanleff was 37.5 °C (99.5 °F) on 19 July 2016; the coldest temperature ever recorded was −8.0 °C (17.6 °F) on 11 December 1991.

Climate data for Lanleff (1981–2010 averages, extremes 1987−present)
Month	Jan	Feb	Mar	Apr	May	Jun	Jul	Aug	Sep	Oct	Nov	Dec	Year
Record high °C (°F)	17.1 (62.8)	22.0 (71.6)	24.9 (76.8)	28.0 (82.4)	31.0 (87.8)	33.4 (92.1)	37.5 (99.5)	37.0 (98.6)	32.0 (89.6)	30.9 (87.6)	21.7 (71.1)	18.0 (64.4)	37.5 (99.5)
Mean daily maximum °C (°F)	9.5 (49.1)	10.1 (50.2)	12.3 (54.1)	13.9 (57.0)	17.3 (63.1)	20.1 (68.2)	22.2 (72.0)	22.6 (72.7)	20.2 (68.4)	16.5 (61.7)	12.3 (54.1)	9.6 (49.3)	15.6 (60.1)
Daily mean °C (°F)	6.7 (44.1)	7.0 (44.6)	8.5 (47.3)	9.6 (49.3)	12.8 (55.0)	15.3 (59.5)	17.3 (63.1)	17.6 (63.7)	15.5 (59.9)	12.7 (54.9)	9.1 (48.4)	6.8 (44.2)	11.6 (52.9)
Mean daily minimum °C (°F)	3.9 (39.0)	3.8 (38.8)	4.7 (40.5)	5.4 (41.7)	8.3 (46.9)	10.5 (50.9)	12.4 (54.3)	12.6 (54.7)	10.9 (51.6)	8.9 (48.0)	6.0 (42.8)	4.1 (39.4)	7.6 (45.7)
Record low °C (°F)	−8.0 (17.6)	−8.0 (17.6)	−3.6 (25.5)	−3.0 (26.6)	−1.4 (29.5)	2.0 (35.6)	4.2 (39.6)	4.8 (40.6)	1.9 (35.4)	−3.5 (25.7)	−5.5 (22.1)	−8.0 (17.6)	−8.0 (17.6)
Average precipitation mm (inches)	84.9 (3.34)	78.2 (3.08)	60.1 (2.37)	71.8 (2.83)	60.2 (2.37)	50.1 (1.97)	49.2 (1.94)	45.9 (1.81)	57.1 (2.25)	85.4 (3.36)	97.0 (3.82)	99.4 (3.91)	839.3 (33.04)
Average precipitation days (≥ 1.0 mm)	14.0	13.0	11.5	12.0	9.5	8.0	8.5	7.7	9.1	13.9	15.1	14.6	136.9
Source: Météo France

== Population ==
Inhabitants of Lanleff are called lanleffois in French.

Historical population
Year	Pop.	±% p.a.
1968	117	—
1975	88	−3.99%
1982	87	−0.16%
1990	101	+1.88%
1999	110	+0.95%
2007	100	−1.18%
2012	106	+1.17%
2017	121	+2.68%
2023	121	+0.00%
Source: INSEE

== See also ==
- Communes of the Côtes-d'Armor department
