= Pléhédel =

Pléhédel Plehedel
- Commune
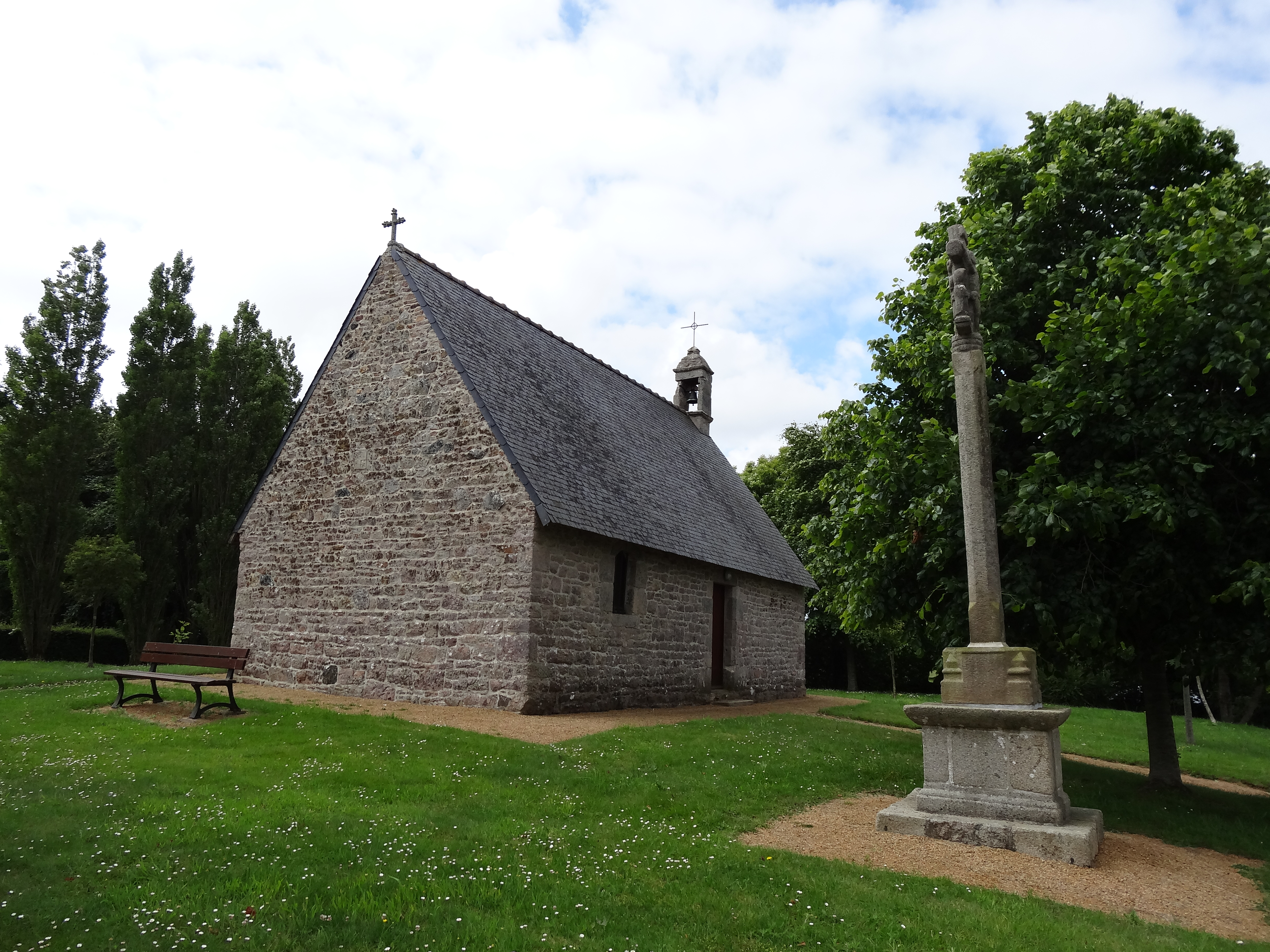
- The chapel of Saint-Michel, in Pléhédel

- Coat of arms
- Location of Pléhédel
- Location within France Location within Brittany
- Coordinates: 48°41′43″N 3°00′25″W
- Country: France
- Region: Brittany
- Department: Côtes-d'Armor
- Arrondissement: Guingamp
- Canton: Paimpol
- Intercommunality: Guingamp-Paimpol Agglomération

Government
  - Mayor (2020–2026): Daniel Ropers
- Area^{1}: 12.36 km^{2} (4.77 sq mi)
- Highest elevation: 107 m (351 ft)
- Lowest elevation: 22 m (72 ft)
- Population (2023): 1,306
  - Density: 105.7/km^{2} (273.7/sq mi)
- Time zone: UTC+01:00 (CET)
  - Summer (DST): UTC+02:00 (CEST)
- INSEE/Postal code: 22178 /22290
- ^{1} French Land Register data, which excludes lakes, ponds, glaciers > 1 km^{2} (0.386 sq mi or 247 acres) and river estuaries.

Pléhédel (French pronunciation: [ple.edɛl]; Breton: Plehedel) is a commune in the Côtes-d'Armor department of Brittany in northwestern France.

== Population ==
Historical population
Year	Pop.	±% p.a.
1968	1,134	—
1975	1,185	+0.63%
1982	1,200	+0.18%
1990	1,085	−1.25%
1999	1,122	+0.37%
2007	1,272	+1.58%
2012	1,286	+0.22%
2017	1,313	+0.42%
2023	1,306	−0.09%
Source: INSEE

Inhabitants of Pléhédel are called pléhédelais in French.

== Notable people ==
- Boisgelin Family
  - Charles Eugène, Comte de Boisgelin (1726–1791), naval officer and vicomte and governor of the town
  - Alexandre-Joseph, Marquis de Boisgelin (1770–1821), last personal bodyguard to the Queen of France and émigré officer

== See also ==
- Communes of the Côtes-d'Armor department
