= Les Pennes-Mirabeau =

Commune in Provence-Alpes-Côte d'Azur, France

- Commune
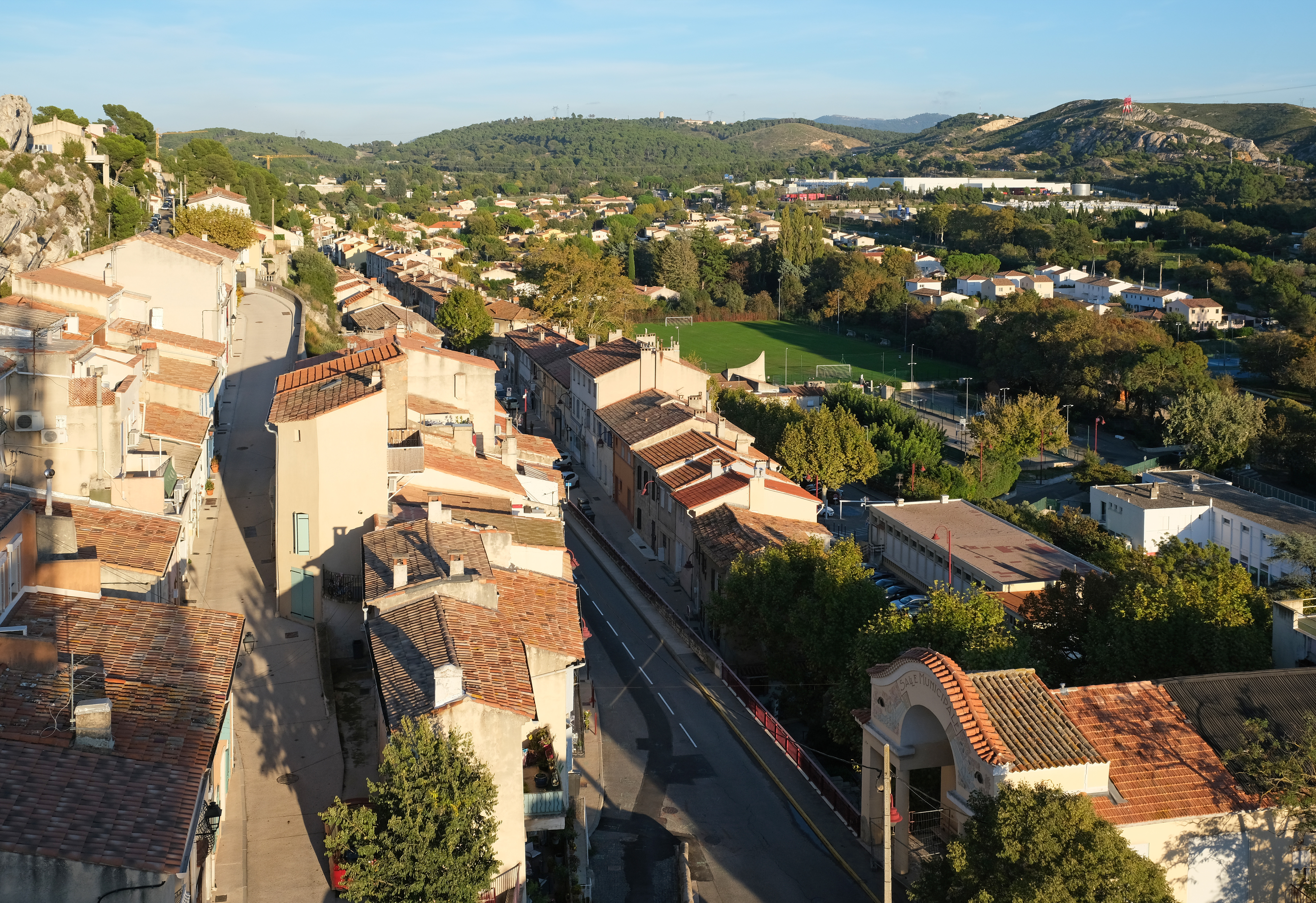

- Coat of arms
- Location of Les Pennes-Mirabeau
- Location within France Location within Provence-Alpes-Côte d'Azur
- Coordinates: 43°24′38″N 5°18′37″E
- Country: France
- Region: Provence-Alpes-Côte d'Azur
- Department: Bouches-du-Rhône
- Arrondissement: Aix-en-Provence
- Canton: Gardanne
- Intercommunality: Aix-Marseille-Provence

Government
  - Mayor (2026–32): Romain Amaro
- Area^{1}: 33.66 km^{2} (13.00 sq mi)
- Elevation: 100 m (330 ft)
- Highest elevation: 287 m (942 ft)
- Lowest elevation: 56 m (184 ft)
- Population (2023): 22,537
  - Density: 669.5/km^{2} (1,734/sq mi)
- Time zone: UTC+01:00 (CET)
  - Summer (DST): UTC+02:00 (CEST)
- INSEE/Postal code: 13071 /13170
- ^{1} French Land Register data, which excludes lakes, ponds, glaciers > 1 km^{2} (0.386 sq mi or 247 acres) and river estuaries.

Les Pennes-Mirabeau (French pronunciation: [le pɛn miʁabo]; Occitan: Lei Penas de Mirabèu) is a commune in the Bouches-du-Rhône department in southern France, located 13.5 km (8.4 mi) from Marseille. In May every year, a medieval festival attracts tens of thousands people.

== Population ==
Historical population

Year	Pop.	±% p.a.
1793	862	—
1800	908	+0.75%
1806	1,212	+4.93%
1821	1,316	+0.55%
1831	1,680	+2.47%
1836	1,626	−0.65%
1841	1,717	+1.10%
1846	1,939	+2.46%
1851	1,945	+0.06%
1856	1,935	−0.10%
1861	1,960	+0.26%
1866	2,026	+0.66%
1872	2,000	−0.22%
1876	2,015	+0.19%
1881	1,918	−0.98%
1886	1,971	+0.55%
1891	2,001	+0.30%
1896	1,992	−0.09%
1901	1,997	+0.05%

Year	Pop.	±% p.a.
1906	2,117	+1.17%
1911	2,355	+2.15%
1921	2,578	+0.91%
1926	3,181	+4.29%
1931	4,270	+6.07%
1936	4,866	+2.65%
1946	5,601	+1.42%
1954	7,097	+3.00%
1962	7,615	+0.88%
1968	10,146	+4.90%
1975	14,839	+5.58%
1982	15,691	+0.80%
1990	18,599	+2.15%
1999	19,041	+0.26%
2007	20,238	+0.77%
2012	20,279	+0.04%
2017	21,046	+0.75%
2023	22,537	+1.15%

Source: EHESS and INSEE (1968–2023)

== Twin towns – sister cities ==
Les Pennes-Mirabeau is twinned with:

- (Republic of Artsakh) Martuni (Khojavend), Nagorno-Karabakh: Les Pennes-Mirabeau and Martuni became sister cities on 11 June 2013.

== See also ==
- Communes of the Bouches-du-Rhône department
