= Kerfot =

Kerfot Kerfod
- Commune
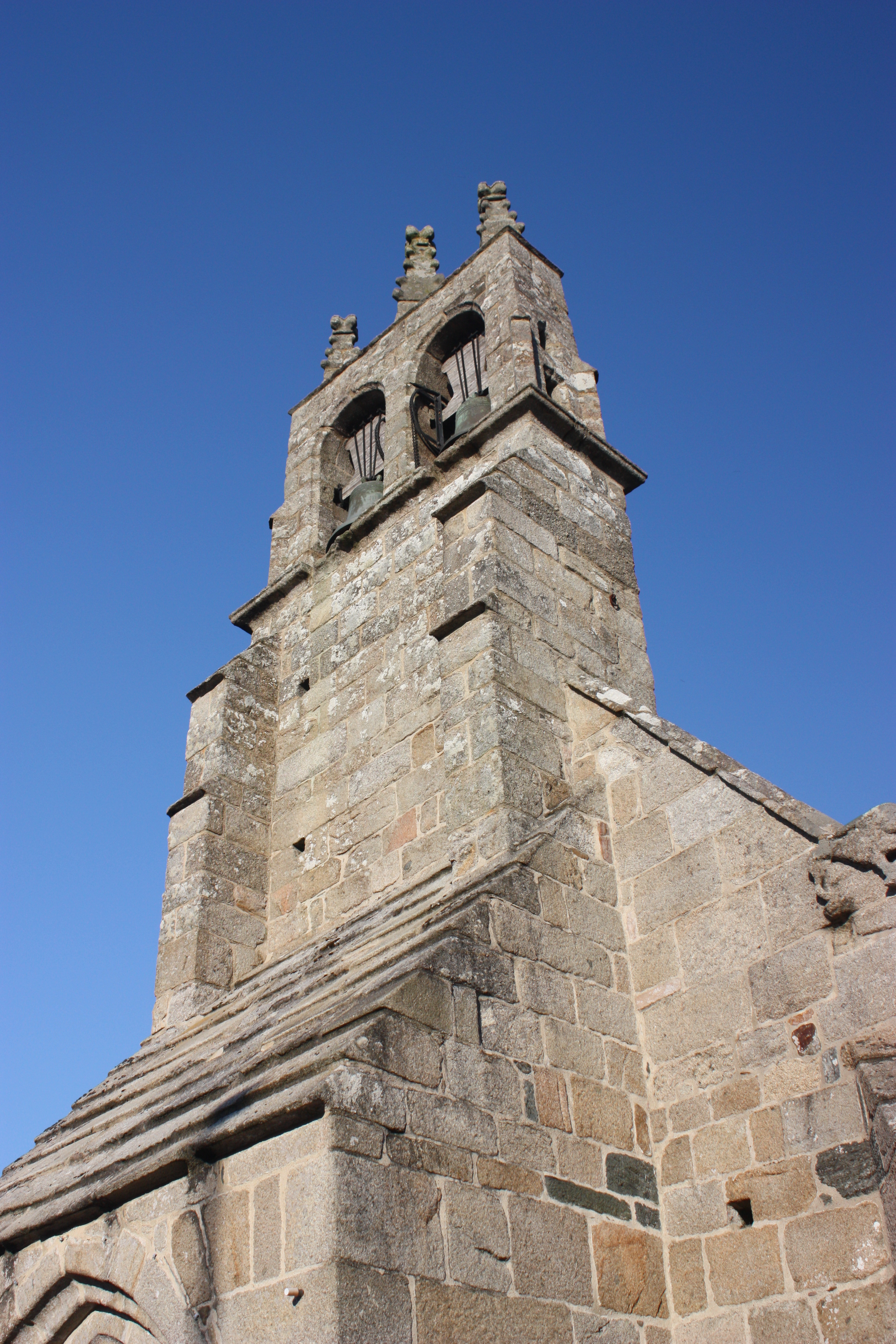
- The church of Kerfot
- Location of Kerfot
- Location within France Location within Brittany
- Coordinates: 48°44′14″N 3°01′43″W
- Country: France
- Region: Brittany
- Department: Côtes-d'Armor
- Arrondissement: Guingamp
- Canton: Paimpol
- Intercommunality: Guingamp-Paimpol Agglomération

Government
  - Mayor (2020–2026): Caroline Samson-Raoul
- Area^{1}: 5.71 km^{2} (2.20 sq mi)
- Highest elevation: 101 m (331 ft)
- Lowest elevation: 28 m (92 ft)
- Population (2023): 642
  - Density: 112/km^{2} (291/sq mi)
- Time zone: UTC+01:00 (CET)
  - Summer (DST): UTC+02:00 (CEST)
- INSEE/Postal code: 22086 /22500
- ^{1} French Land Register data, which excludes lakes, ponds, glaciers > 1 km^{2} (0.386 sq mi or 247 acres) and river estuaries.

Kerfot (French pronunciation: [kɛʁfɔt]; Breton: Kerfod) is a commune in the Côtes-d'Armor department of Brittany in northwestern France.

== Population ==
Inhabitants of Kerfot are called kerfotais in French.

Historical population
Year	Pop.	±% p.a.
1968	465	—
1975	466	+0.03%
1982	612	+3.97%
1990	617	+0.10%
1999	590	−0.50%
2007	592	+0.04%
2012	684	+2.93%
2017	695	+0.32%
2023	642	−1.31%
Source: INSEE

== See also ==
- Communes of the Côtes-d'Armor department
