= Goyen =

Goyen or Van Goyen is a surname. Notable people with the surname include:

- James Goyen (1905–1984), Australian property developer
- William Goyen (1915–1983), American novelist
- Jan van Goyen (1596–1656), Dutch painter
