= Lanloup =

Lanloup Sant-Loup
- Commune
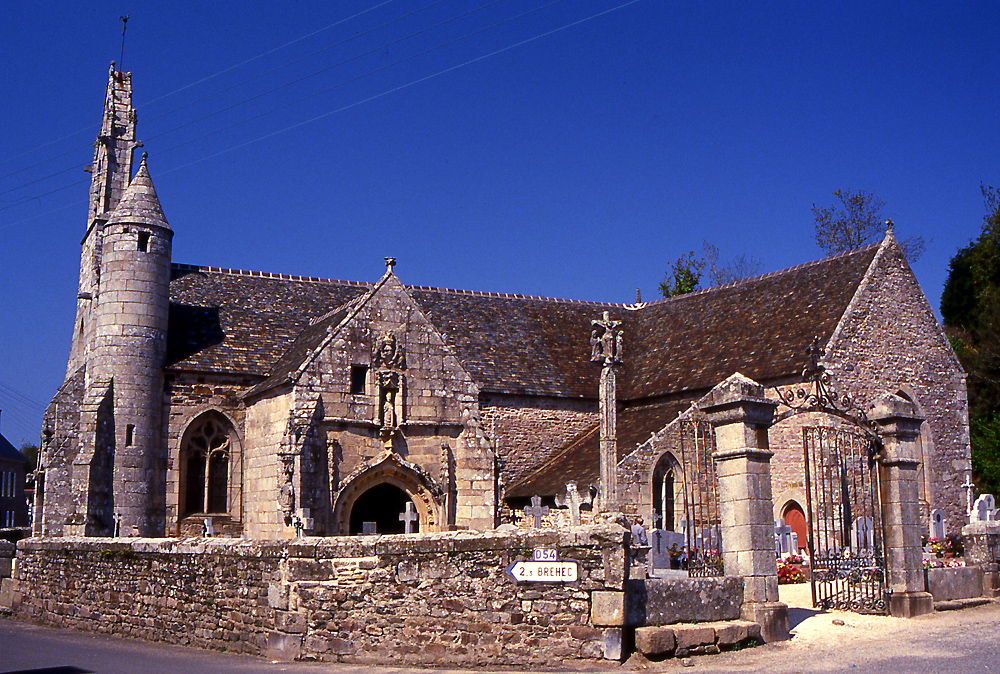
- The church of Lanloup

- Coat of arms
- Location of Lanloup
- Location within France Location within Brittany
- Coordinates: 48°42′48″N 2°57′51″W
- Country: France
- Region: Brittany
- Department: Côtes-d'Armor
- Arrondissement: Guingamp
- Canton: Paimpol
- Intercommunality: Guingamp-Paimpol Agglomération

Government
  - Mayor (2020–2026): Yannick Le Bars
- Area^{1}: 2.45 km^{2} (0.95 sq mi)
- Highest elevation: 97 m (318 ft)
- Lowest elevation: 35 m (115 ft)
- Population (2023): 252
  - Density: 103/km^{2} (266/sq mi)
- Time zone: UTC+01:00 (CET)
  - Summer (DST): UTC+02:00 (CEST)
- INSEE/Postal code: 22109 /22580
- ^{1} French Land Register data, which excludes lakes, ponds, glaciers > 1 km^{2} (0.386 sq mi or 247 acres) and river estuaries.

Lanloup (French pronunciation: [lɑ̃lu]; Breton: Sant-Loup) is a commune in the Côtes-d'Armor department of Brittany in northwestern France.

== Population ==
Historical population
Year	Pop.	±% p.a.
1968	284	—
1975	236	−2.61%
1982	209	−1.72%
1990	195	−0.86%
1999	214	+1.04%
2007	271	+3.00%
2012	264	−0.52%
2017	222	−3.41%
2023	252	+2.14%
Source: INSEE

Inhabitants of Lanloup are called lanloupais in French.

== See also ==
- Communes of the Côtes-d'Armor department
