= Plourivo =

Plourivo Plourivoù
- Commune
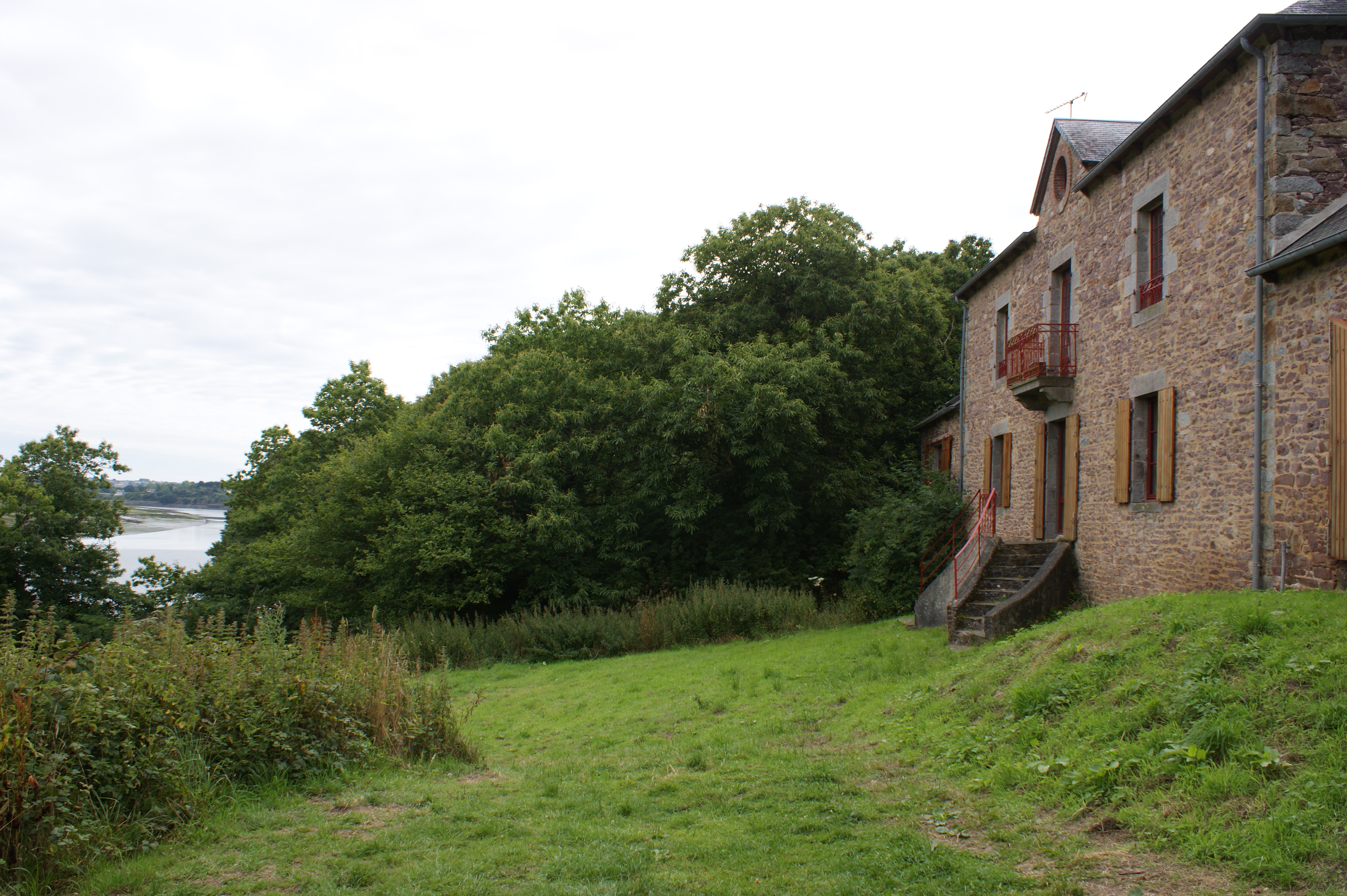
- Manor house of Traou-Nez
- Location of Plourivo
- Location within France Location within Brittany
- Coordinates: 48°44′41″N 3°04′18″W
- Country: France
- Region: Brittany
- Department: Côtes-d'Armor
- Arrondissement: Guingamp
- Canton: Paimpol
- Intercommunality: Guingamp-Paimpol Agglomération

Government
  - Mayor (2020–2026): Véronique Cadudal
- Area^{1}: 28.35 km^{2} (10.95 sq mi)
- Highest elevation: 100 m (330 ft)
- Lowest elevation: 1 m (3.3 ft)
- Population (2023): 2,270
  - Density: 80.1/km^{2} (207/sq mi)
- Time zone: UTC+01:00 (CET)
  - Summer (DST): UTC+02:00 (CEST)
- INSEE/Postal code: 22233 /22860
- ^{1} French Land Register data, which excludes lakes, ponds, glaciers > 1 km^{2} (0.386 sq mi or 247 acres) and river estuaries.

Plourivo (French pronunciation: [pluʁivo]; Breton: Plourivoù) is a commune in the Côtes-d'Armor department of Brittany in northwestern France.

== Population ==
Inhabitants of Plourivo are called plouriviens or plourivotains in French.

Historical population
Year	Pop.	±% p.a.
1968	1,869	—
1975	1,933	+0.48%
1982	1,927	−0.04%
1990	1,932	+0.03%
1999	1,973	+0.23%
2007	2,134	+0.99%
2012	2,218	+0.78%
2017	2,275	+0.51%
2023	2,270	−0.04%
Source: INSEE

== See also ==
- Communes of the Côtes-d'Armor department
