= Ploubazlanec =

Ploubazlanec Plaeraneg
- Commune
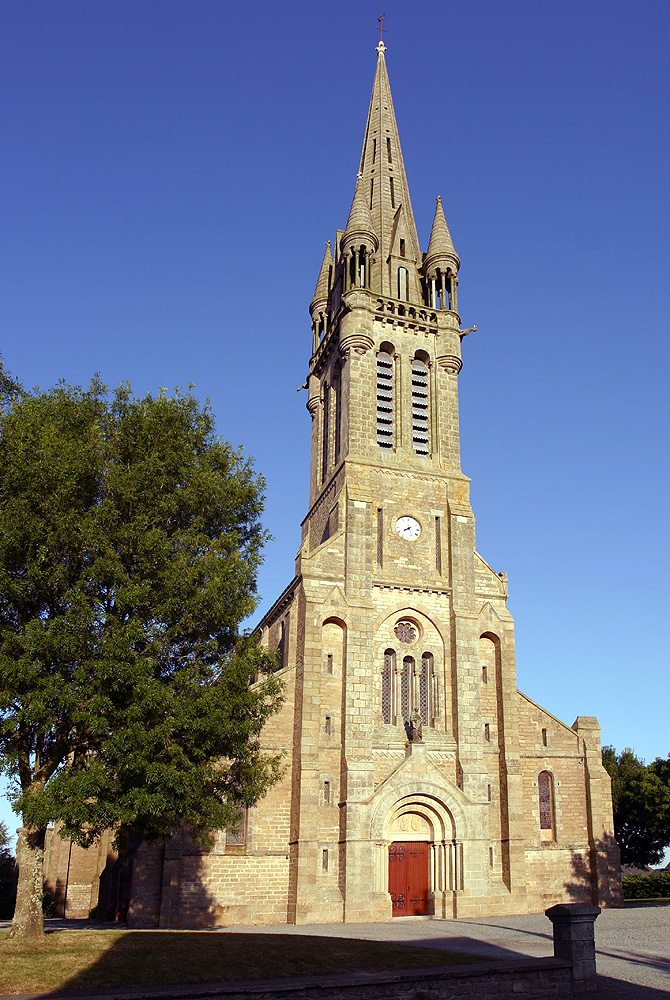
- The church of Ploubazlanec
- Location of Ploubazlanec
- Location within France Location within Brittany
- Coordinates: 48°48′05″N 3°01′56″W
- Country: France
- Region: Brittany
- Department: Côtes-d'Armor
- Arrondissement: Guingamp
- Canton: Paimpol
- Intercommunality: Guingamp-Paimpol Agglomération

Government
  - Mayor (2021–2026): Richard Vibert
- Area^{1}: 15.04 km^{2} (5.81 sq mi)
- Highest elevation: 72 m (236 ft)
- Lowest elevation: 0 m (0 ft)
- Population (2023): 2,932
  - Density: 194.9/km^{2} (504.9/sq mi)
- Time zone: UTC+01:00 (CET)
  - Summer (DST): UTC+02:00 (CEST)
- INSEE/Postal code: 22210 /22620
- ^{1} French Land Register data, which excludes lakes, ponds, glaciers > 1 km^{2} (0.386 sq mi or 247 acres) and river estuaries.

Ploubazlanec (French pronunciation: [plubazlanɛk]; Breton: Plaeraneg) is a commune in the Côtes-d'Armor department in Brittany in northwestern France.

Historically its economy relied on fishing. Fishermen in the 19th century and early 20th century went to Iceland aboard sailing ships called goelettes.

The name Ploubazlanec is typically Breton, "plou" meaning "land of". The name changed from Pleraneg, which still can be seen on road signs.

Ploubazlanec is the embarkation point for boats to the Île-de-Bréhat.

The place was made famous by the French novel by Pierre Loti, Pêcheur d'Islande.

== Population ==
Inhabitants of Ploubazlanec are called ploubazlanecains in French.

Historical population
Year	Pop.	±% p.a.
1968	3,500	—
1975	3,358	−0.59%
1982	3,653	+1.21%
1990	3,725	+0.24%
1999	3,321	−1.27%
2007	3,250	−0.27%
2012	3,125	−0.78%
2017	3,014	−0.72%
2023	2,932	−0.46%
Source: INSEE

== See also ==
- Communes of the Côtes-d'Armor department
