= Plouézec =

Plouézec Ploueg-ar-Mor
- Commune
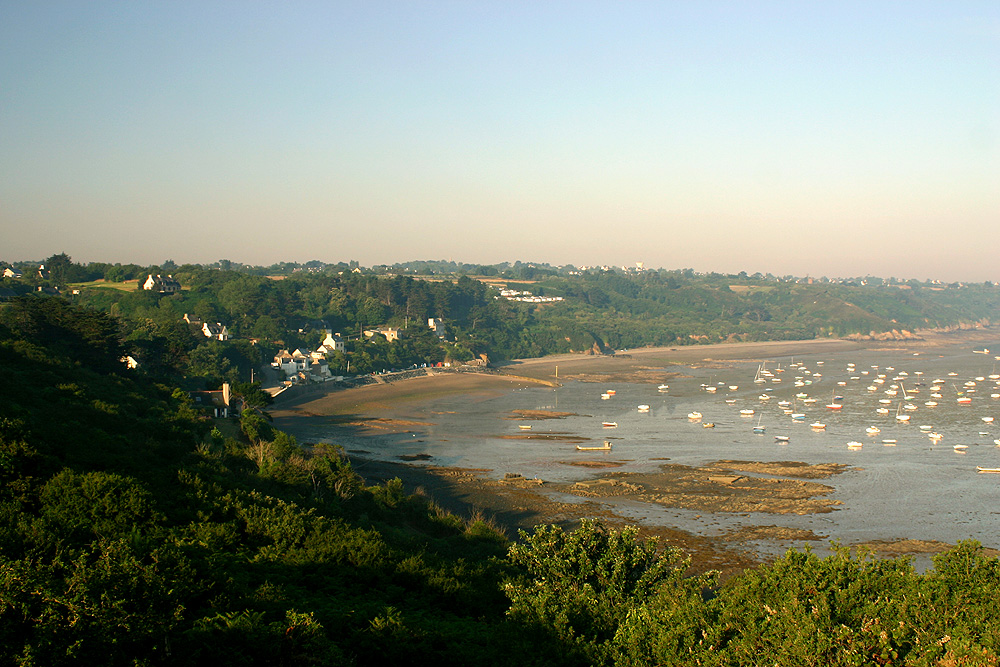
- View over Port Lazo

- Coat of arms
- Location of Plouézec
- Location within France Location within Brittany
- Coordinates: 48°44′56″N 2°59′02″W
- Country: France
- Region: Brittany
- Department: Côtes-d'Armor
- Arrondissement: Guingamp
- Canton: Paimpol
- Intercommunality: Guingamp-Paimpol Agglomération

Government
  - Mayor (2023–2026): Gilles Pagny
- Area^{1}: 27.87 km^{2} (10.76 sq mi)
- Highest elevation: 106 m (348 ft)
- Lowest elevation: 0 m (0 ft)
- Population (2023): 3,147
  - Density: 112.9/km^{2} (292.5/sq mi)
- Time zone: UTC+01:00 (CET)
  - Summer (DST): UTC+02:00 (CEST)
- INSEE/Postal code: 22214 /22470
- ^{1} French Land Register data, which excludes lakes, ponds, glaciers > 1 km^{2} (0.386 sq mi or 247 acres) and river estuaries.

Plouézec (French pronunciation: [pluezɛk]; Breton: Ploueg-ar-Mor) is a commune in the Côtes-d'Armor department in Brittany in northwestern France.

It has 17 km of rugged coastline that makes it a tourist destination all year round, with beaches such as Bréhec and Pors Pin.

Plouézec is twinned with the Irish town of Ballinamore and the twinning committee hosts a Fest Noz festival every August around the Moulin de Craca which regularly draws thousands of visitors. There is traditional Irish and Breton music, as well as food and drink available. Especially popular is the famous moules-frites, which is a dish of mussels and French fries.

It has been strongly influenced by the sea and local people often refer to themselves as enfants de la mer (children of the sea). Water-based sports such as fishing, sailing, and swimming are very popular and are practised by locals and tourists alike.

== Population ==
Inhabitants of Plouézec are called plouézécains in French.

Historical population
| Year | Pop. | ±% p.a. |
|---|---|---|
| 1968 | 3,481 | — |
| 1975 | 3,399 | −0.34% |
| 1982 | 3,124 | −1.20% |
| 1990 | 3,089 | −0.14% |
| 1999 | 3,181 | +0.33% |
| 2007 | 3,322 | +0.54% |
| 2012 | 3,296 | −0.16% |
| 2017 | 3,182 | −0.70% |
| 2023 | 3,147 | −0.18% |
Source: INSEE

== Breton language ==
The municipality launched a linguistic plan through Ya d'ar brezhoneg on 14 November 2008.

== See also ==
- Communes of the Côtes-d'Armor department
