= Saint-Sardos =

Saint-Sardos may refer to:

- Saint Sardos, Bishop Sacerdos of Limoges (d. c. 720)
- Saint-Sardos, Lot-et-Garonne, a commune in France
- Saint-Sardos, Tarn-et-Garonne, a commune in France
- Saint-Sardos VDQS, a French wine classification
