= Aucamville =

Aucamville is the name of the following communes in France:

- Aucamville, Haute-Garonne, in the Haute-Garonne department
- Aucamville, Tarn-et-Garonne, in the Tarn-et-Garonne department
