= Montbartier =

- Commune
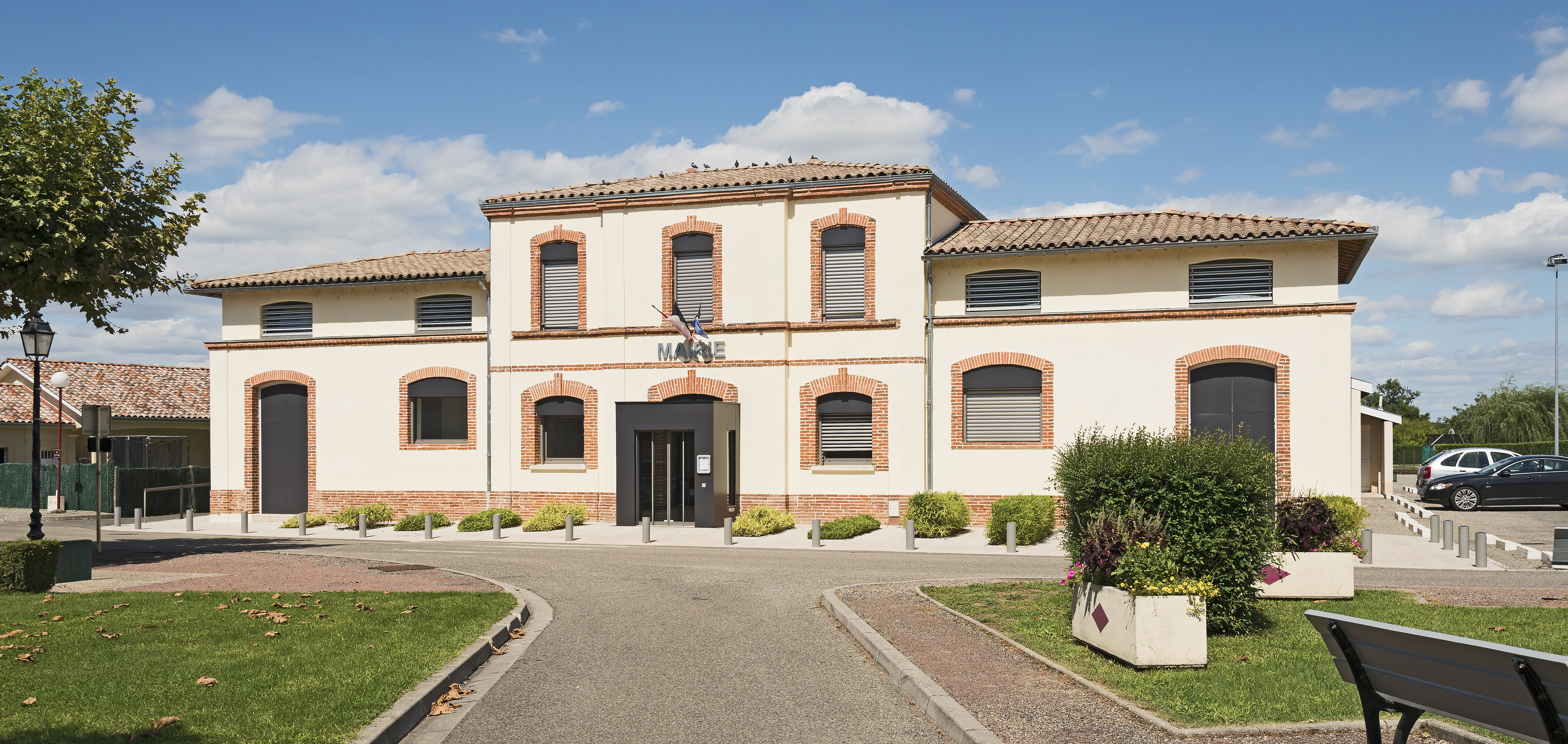
- The town hall of Montbartier

- Coat of arms
- Location of Montbartier
- Location within France Location within Occitanie
- Coordinates: 43°54′49″N 1°16′24″E
- Country: France
- Region: Occitania
- Department: Tarn-et-Garonne
- Arrondissement: Montauban
- Canton: Montech
- Intercommunality: Grand Sud Tarn et Garonne

Government
  - Mayor (2020–2026): Jean-Claude Raynal
- Area^{1}: 15.01 km^{2} (5.80 sq mi)
- Elevation: 113 m (371 ft)
- Highest elevation: 141 m (463 ft)
- Lowest elevation: 99 m (325 ft)
- Population (2023): 1,789
  - Density: 119.2/km^{2} (308.7/sq mi)
- Time zone: UTC+01:00 (CET)
  - Summer (DST): UTC+02:00 (CEST)
- INSEE/Postal code: 82123 /82700
- ^{1} French Land Register data, which excludes lakes, ponds, glaciers > 1 km^{2} (0.386 sq mi or 247 acres) and river estuaries.

Montbartier (French pronunciation: [mɔ̃baʁtje]; Occitan: Montbartièr) is a commune in the Tarn-et-Garonne department in the Occitanie region in southern France. Montbartier station has rail connections to Toulouse, Montauban and Brive-la-Gaillarde.

== Monument ==
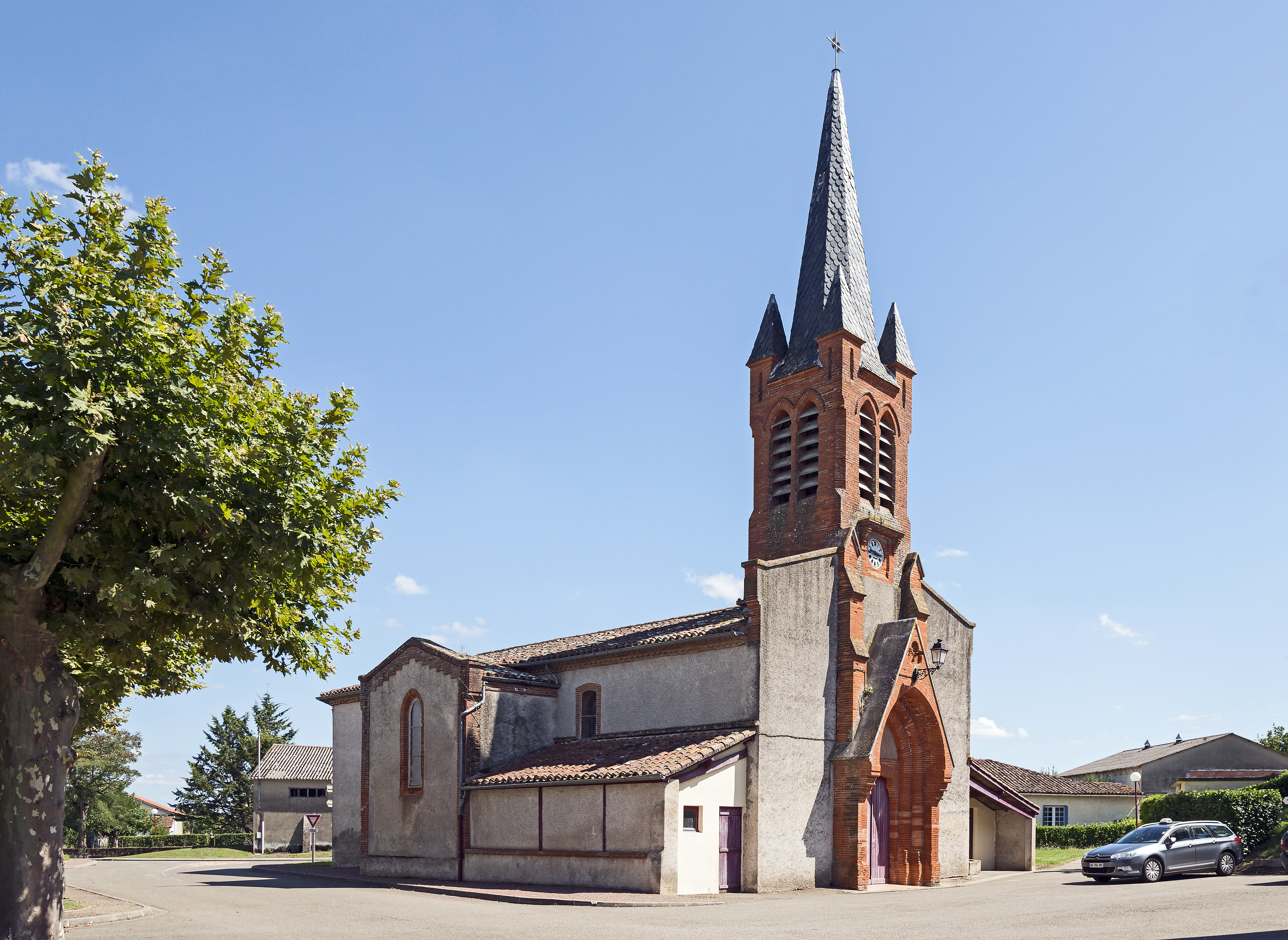
The church

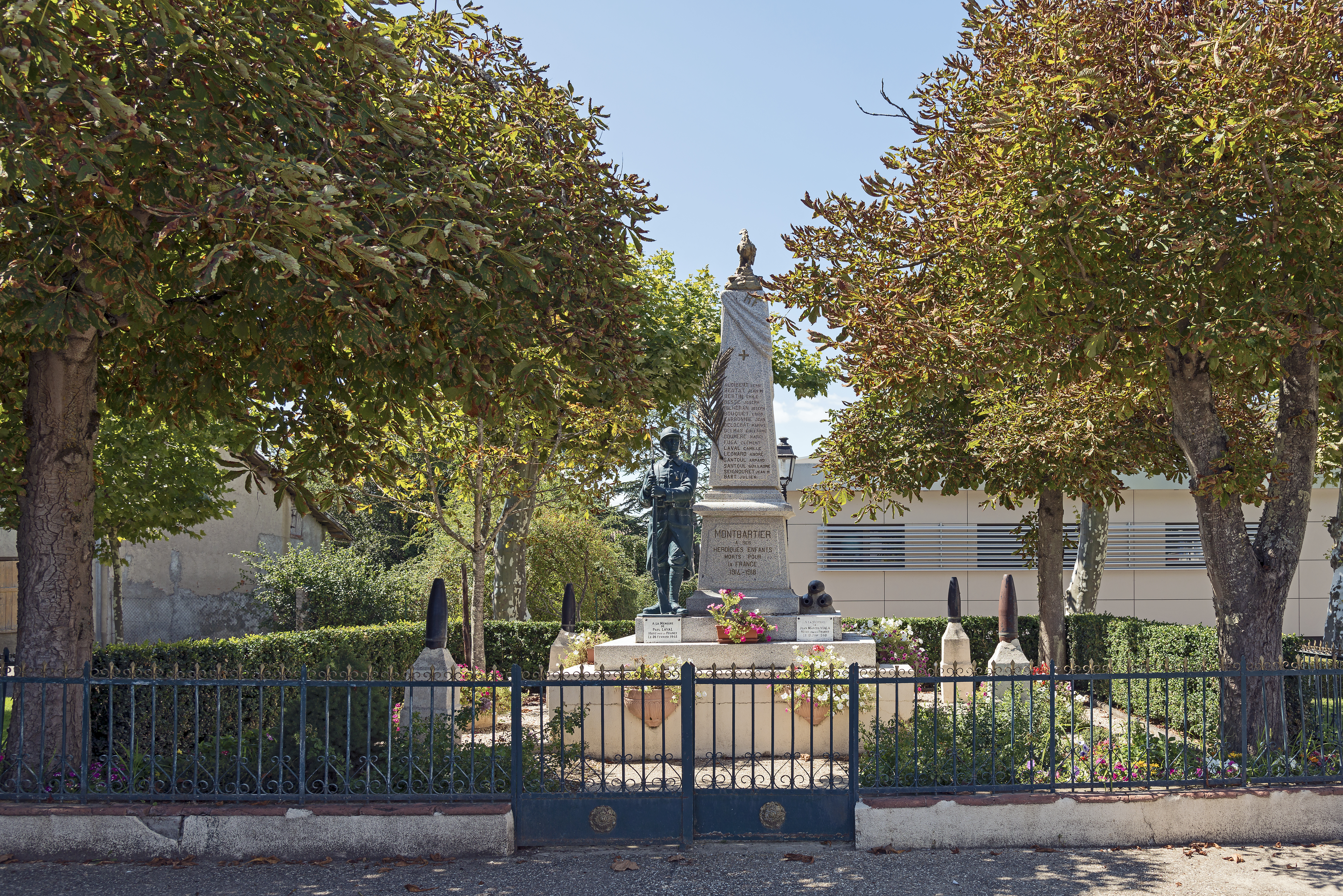
War memorial

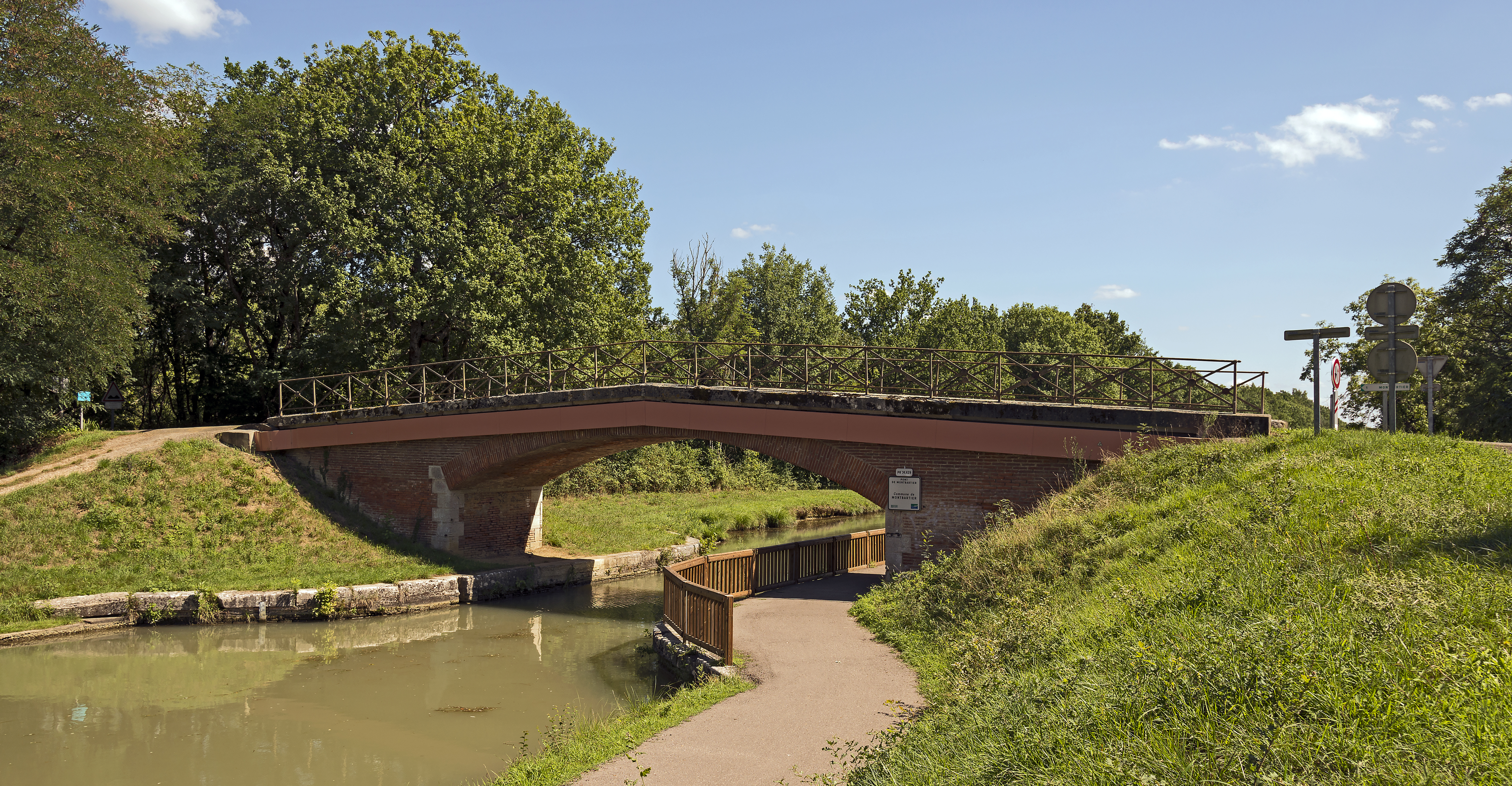
Bridge over the Canal Lateral à la Garonne, north exposure

== See also ==
- Communes of the Tarn-et-Garonne department
