= Montbartier station =

Railway station in Montbartier, France

Montbartier
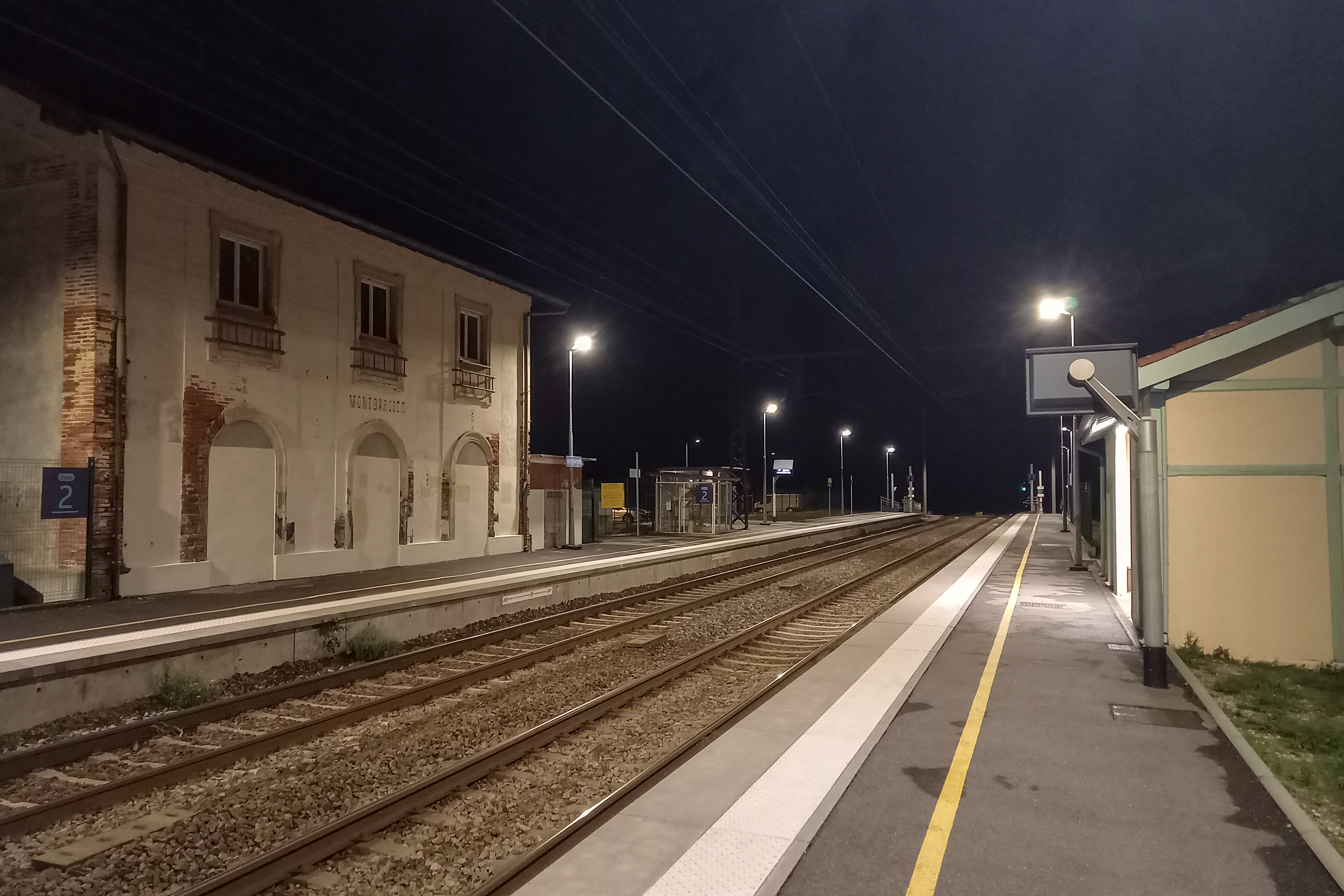
- Monbartier station taken from platform 1 (train station to Toulouse) at night

General information
- Location: Montbartier, Tarn-et-Garonne; Occitanie, France
- Coordinates: 43°55′26″N 1°15′51″E
- Line: Bordeaux–Sète railway
- Platforms: 2
- Tracks: 2

Other information
- Station code: 87611699

Services
Preceding station	TER Occitanie	Following station
Montauban towards Brive-la-Gaillarde	19	Dieupentale towards Toulouse
Location

Montbartier is a railway station in Montbartier, Occitanie, France. The station is located on the Bordeaux–Sète railway. The station is served by TER (local) services operated by SNCF.

== Train services ==
The following services currently call at Montbartier:

- local service (TER Occitanie) Brive-la-Gaillarde–Cahors–Montauban–Toulouse
- local service (TER Occitanie) Montauban–Toulouse
