= Dieupentale station =

Railway station in Dieupentale, France

Dieupentale
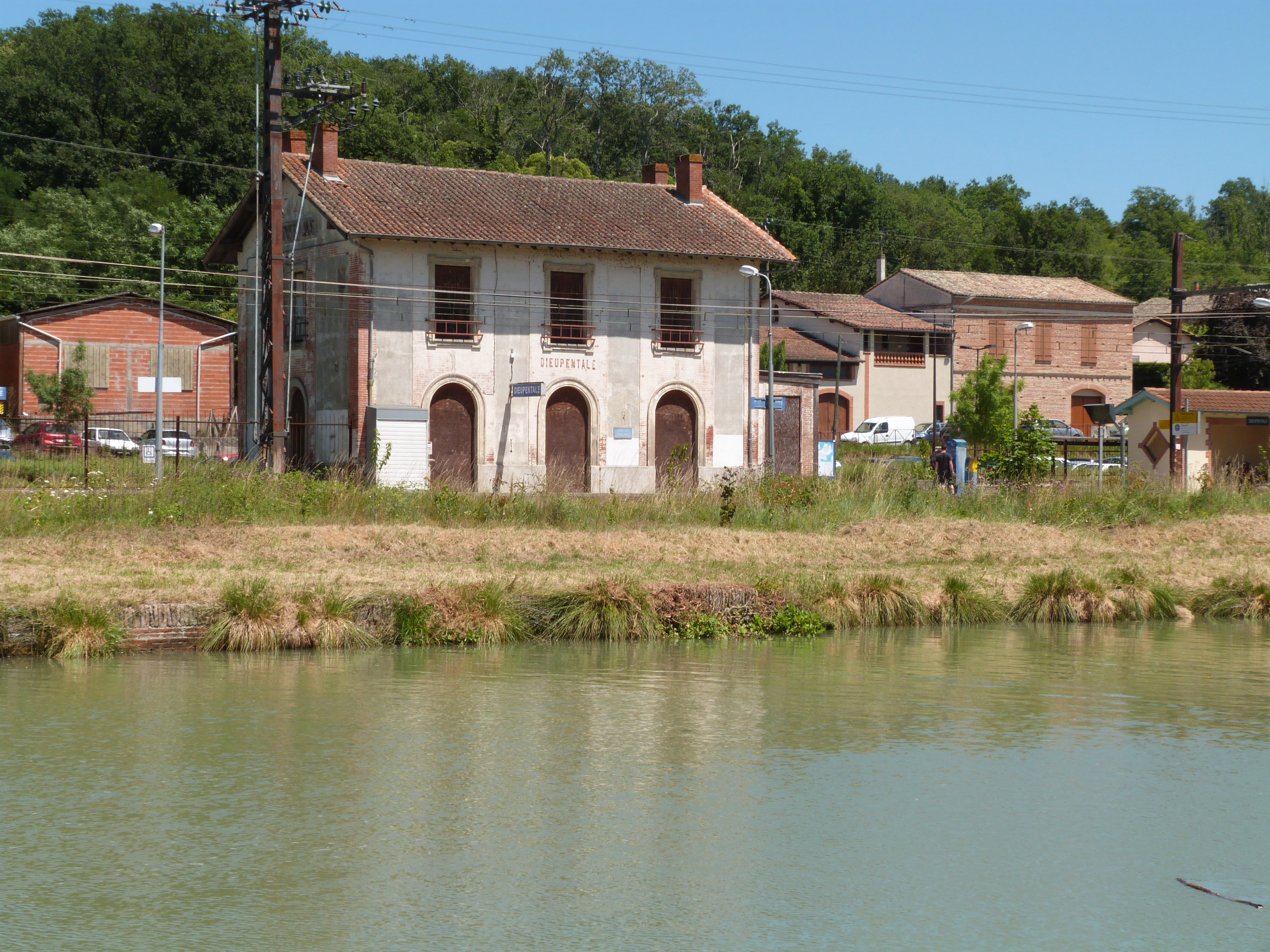
- The station in 2016.

General information
- Location: Dieupentale, Tarn-et-Garonne; Occitanie, France
- Coordinates: 43°51′56″N 1°16′33″E
- Line: Bordeaux–Sète railway
- Platforms: 2
- Tracks: 2

Other information
- Station code: 87611681

Services
Preceding station	TER Occitanie	Following station
Montbartier towards Brive-la-Gaillarde	19	Grisolles towards Toulouse
Location

Dieupentale is a railway station in Dieupentale, Occitanie, France. The station is on the Bordeaux–Sète railway. The station is served by TER (local) services operated by SNCF.

== Train services ==
The following services currently call at Dieupentale:

- local service (TER Occitanie) Brive-la-Gaillarde–Cahors–Montauban–Toulouse
- local service (TER Occitanie) Montauban–Toulouse
