= Fabas, Tarn-et-Garonne =

Fabas
- Commune
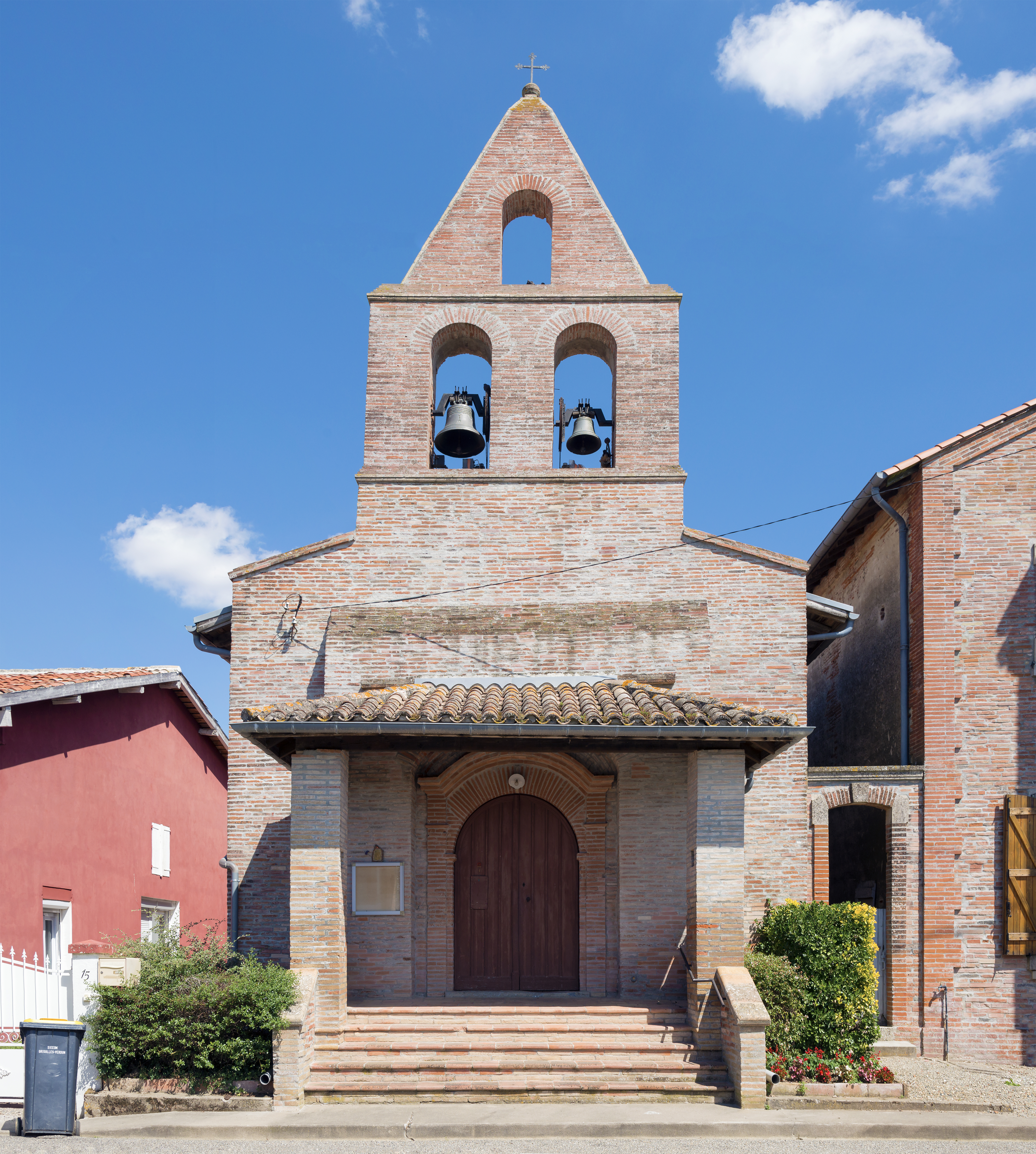
- The church of Fabas

- Coat of arms
- Location of Fabas
- Location within France Location within Occitanie
- Coordinates: 43°51′41″N 1°21′05″E
- Country: France
- Region: Occitania
- Department: Tarn-et-Garonne
- Arrondissement: Montauban
- Canton: Verdun-sur-Garonne
- Intercommunality: Grand Sud Tarn-et-Garonne

Government
  - Mayor (2020–2026): Jérôme Soursac
- Area^{1}: 6.3 km^{2} (2.4 sq mi)
- Elevation: 146 m (479 ft)
- Highest elevation: 154 m (505 ft)
- Lowest elevation: 120 m (390 ft)
- Population (2023): 714
  - Density: 110/km^{2} (290/sq mi)
- Time zone: UTC+01:00 (CET)
  - Summer (DST): UTC+02:00 (CEST)
- INSEE/Postal code: 82057 /82170
- ^{1} French Land Register data, which excludes lakes, ponds, glaciers > 1 km^{2} (0.386 sq mi or 247 acres) and river estuaries.

Fabas is a commune in the Tarn-et-Garonne department in the Occitanie region in southern France.

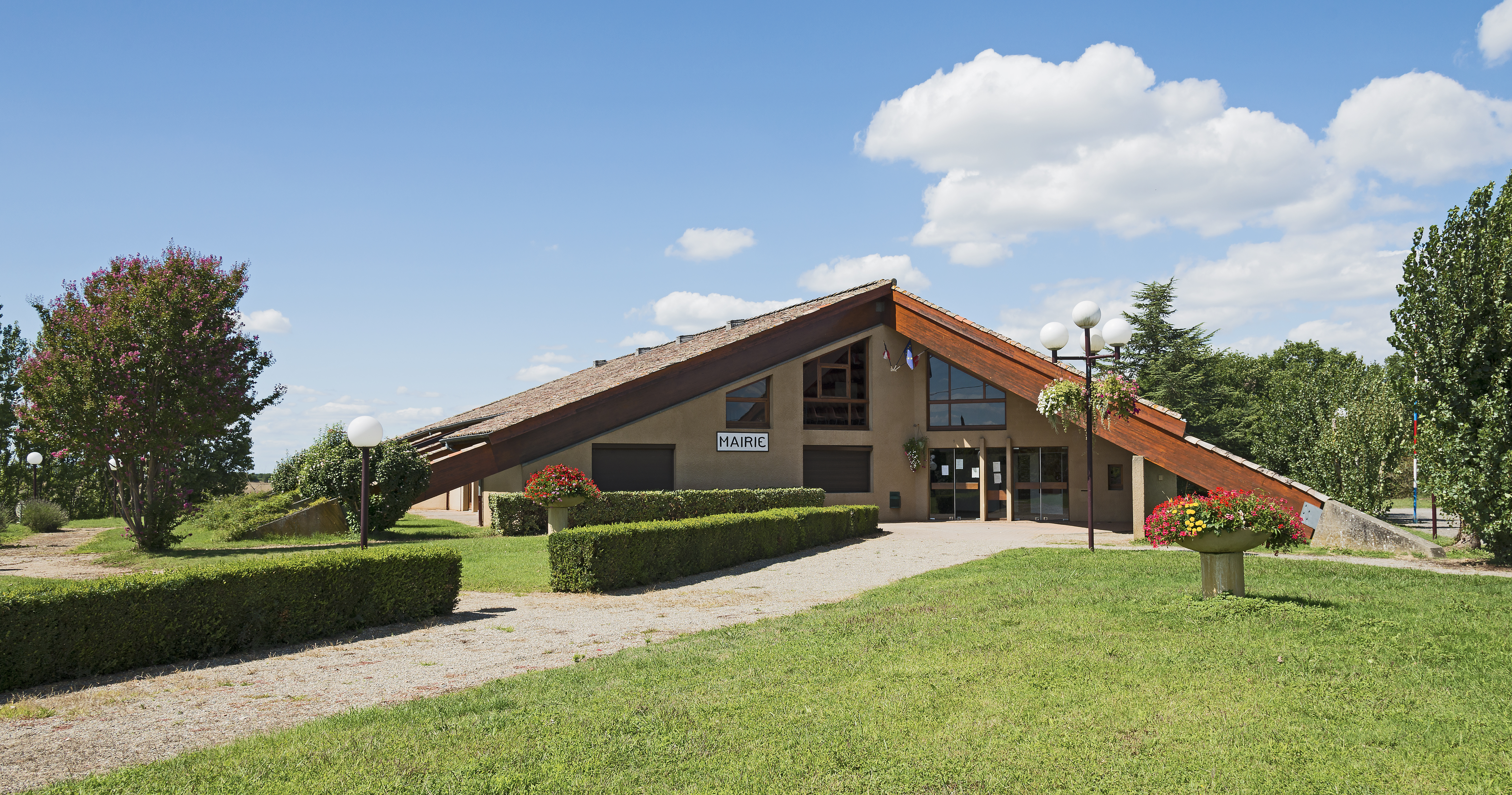
Town hall

== Population ==
Historical population
Year	Pop.	±% p.a.
1968	230	—
1975	210	−1.29%
1982	218	+0.54%
1990	314	+4.67%
1999	322	+0.28%
2007	464	+4.67%
2012	569	+4.16%
2017	621	+1.76%
2023	714	+2.35%
Source: INSEE

== See also ==
- Communes of the Tarn-et-Garonne department
