= Beaupuy, Tarn-et-Garonne =

Beaupuy
- Commune
- Location of Beaupuy
- Location within France Location within Occitanie
- Coordinates: 43°49′19″N 1°07′06″E
- Country: France
- Region: Occitania
- Department: Tarn-et-Garonne
- Arrondissement: Montauban
- Canton: Verdun-sur-Garonne

Government
  - Mayor (2020–2026): Denis Rey
- Area^{1}: 11.81 km^{2} (4.56 sq mi)
- Elevation: 212 m (696 ft)
- Highest elevation: 246 m (807 ft)
- Lowest elevation: 145 m (476 ft)
- Population (2023): 273
  - Density: 23.1/km^{2} (59.9/sq mi)
- Time zone: UTC+01:00 (CET)
  - Summer (DST): UTC+02:00 (CEST)
- INSEE/Postal code: 82014 /82600
- ^{1} French Land Register data, which excludes lakes, ponds, glaciers > 1 km^{2} (0.386 sq mi or 247 acres) and river estuaries.

Beaupuy (French pronunciation: [bopɥi]; Occitan: Bèlpuèg) is a commune in the Tarn-et-Garonne department in the Occitanie region in southern France.

== See also ==
- Communes of the Tarn-et-Garonne department
