= Dieupentale =

- Commune
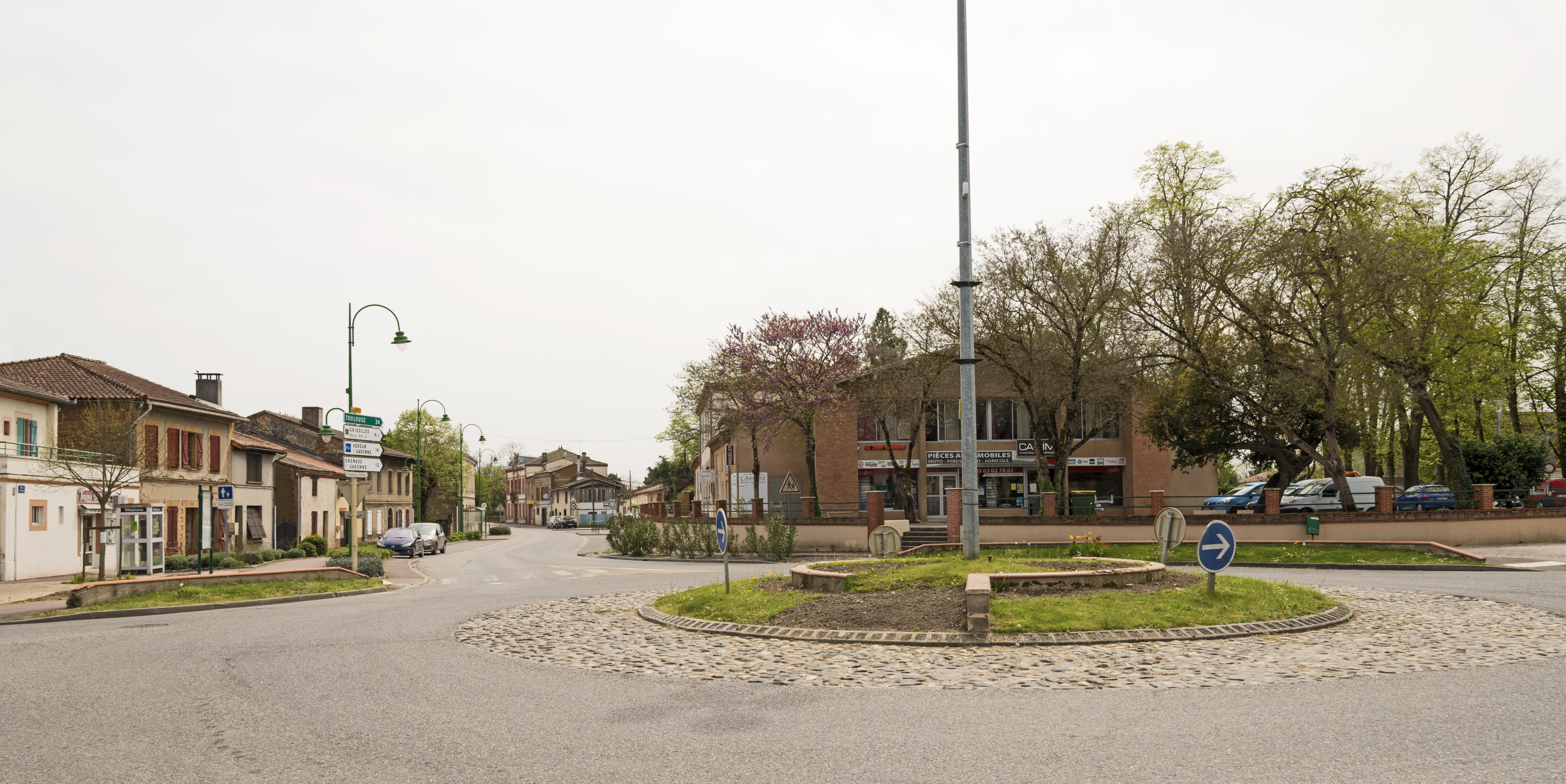
- The roundabout on the Route de Toulouse

- Coat of arms
- Location of Dieupentale
- Location within France Location within Occitanie
- Coordinates: 43°51′48″N 1°16′12″E
- Country: France
- Region: Occitania
- Department: Tarn-et-Garonne
- Arrondissement: Montauban
- Canton: Verdun-sur-Garonne

Government
  - Mayor (2020–2026): Dominique Julien
- Area^{1}: 6.14 km^{2} (2.37 sq mi)
- Elevation: 108 m (354 ft)
- Highest elevation: 154 m (505 ft)
- Lowest elevation: 95 m (312 ft)
- Population (2023): 1,655
  - Density: 270/km^{2} (698/sq mi)
- Time zone: UTC+01:00 (CET)
  - Summer (DST): UTC+02:00 (CEST)
- INSEE/Postal code: 82048 /82170
- ^{1} French Land Register data, which excludes lakes, ponds, glaciers > 1 km^{2} (0.386 sq mi or 247 acres) and river estuaries.

Dieupentale (French pronunciation: [djøpɛ̃tal]; Occitan: Diupentala) is a commune in the Tarn-et-Garonne department in the Occitanie region in southern France. Dieupentale station has rail connections to Toulouse, Montauban and Brive-la-Gaillarde.

== Heraldry ==
Dieupentale	Paly against paly of gules and argent of four pieces.

== Monuments ==
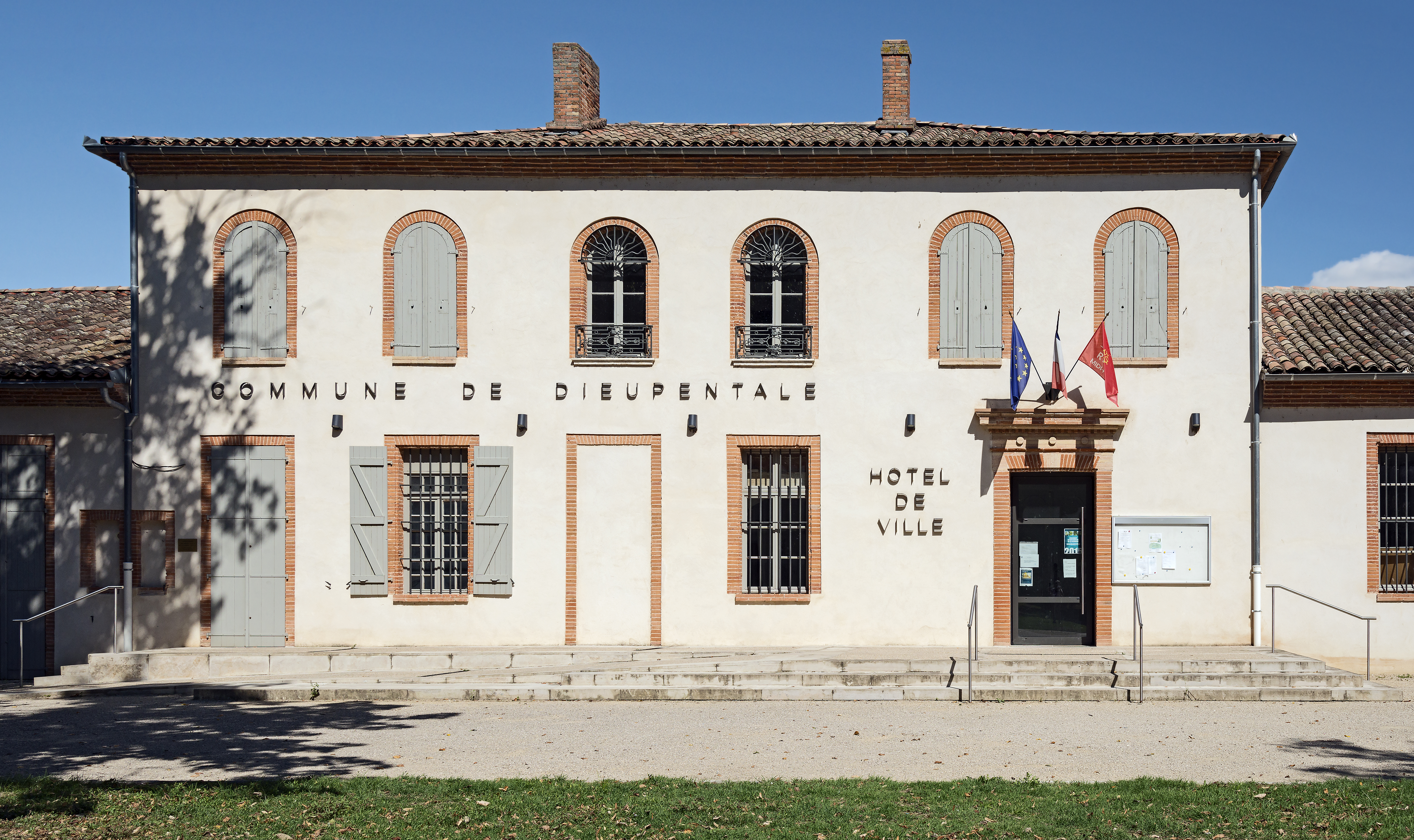
The town hall.

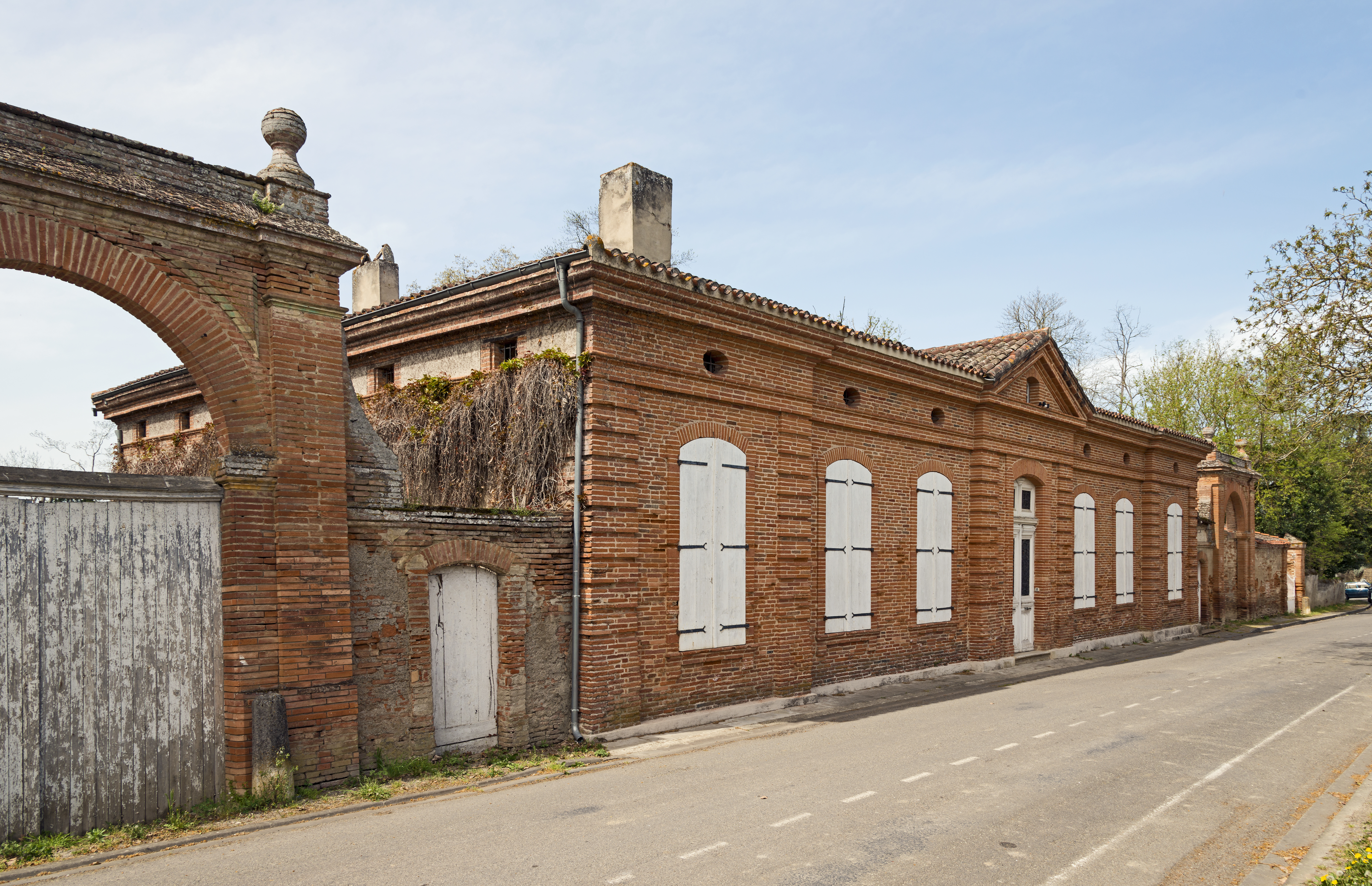
Castle de Laparre Saint-Sernin.

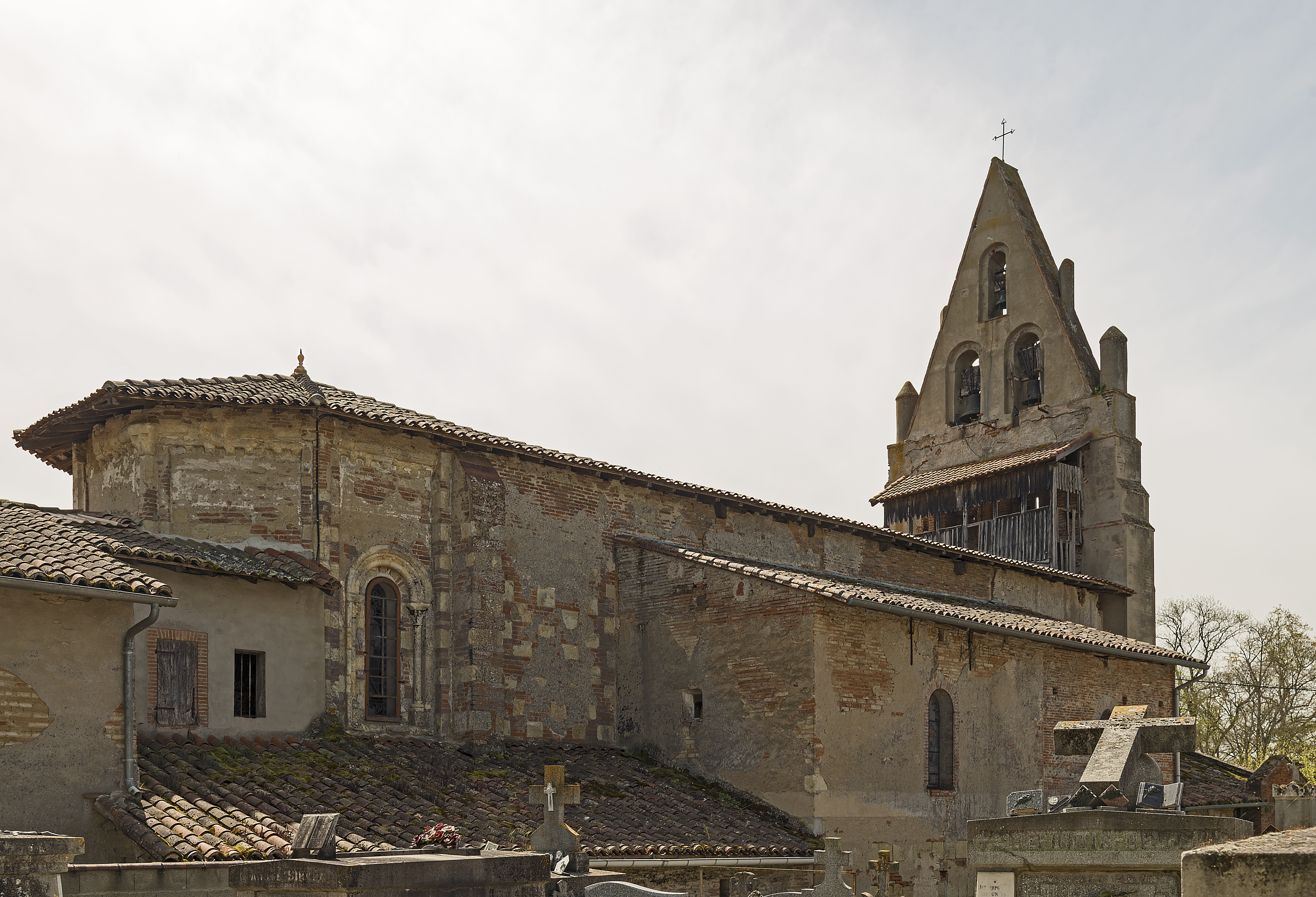
The Church.

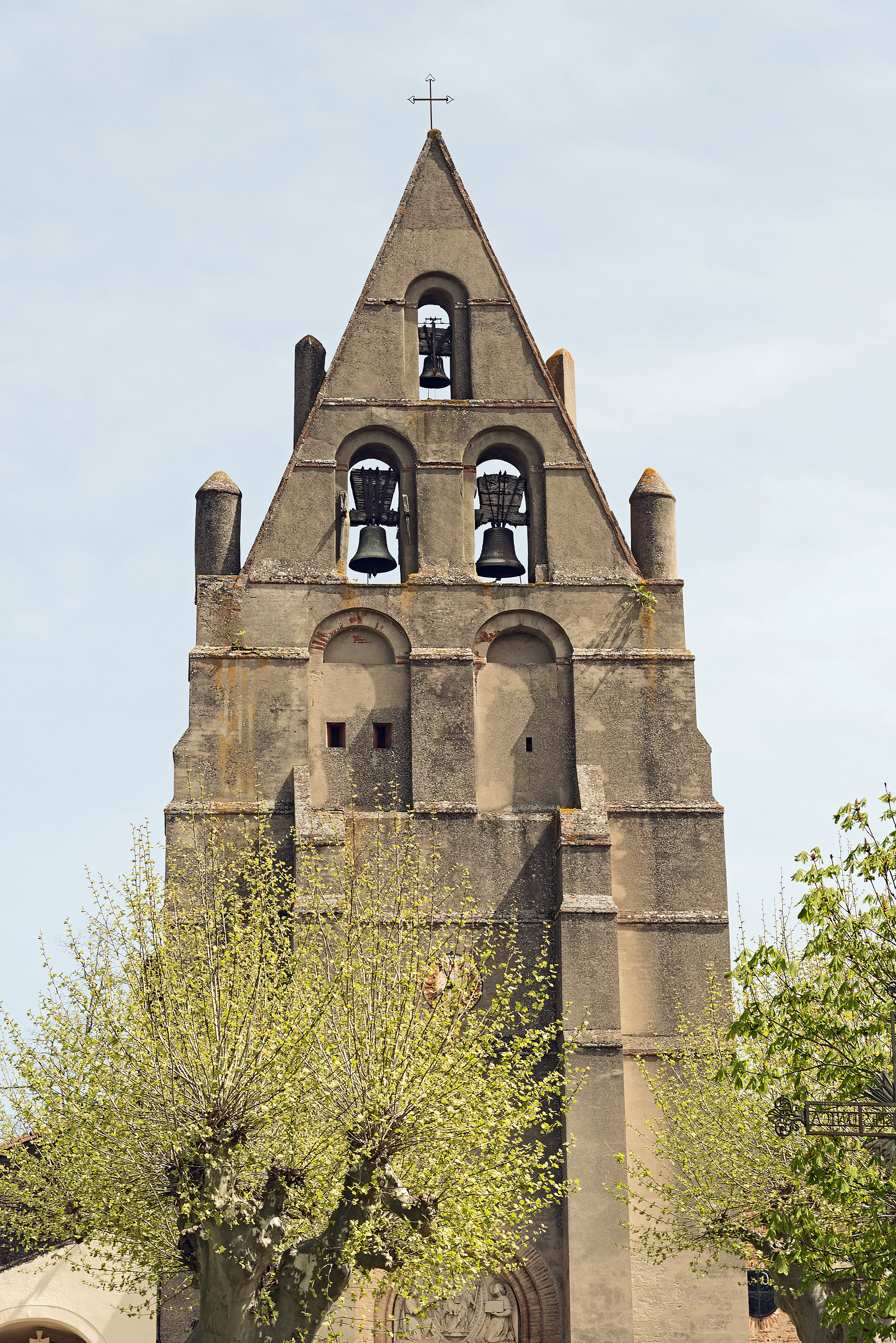
The bell tower.

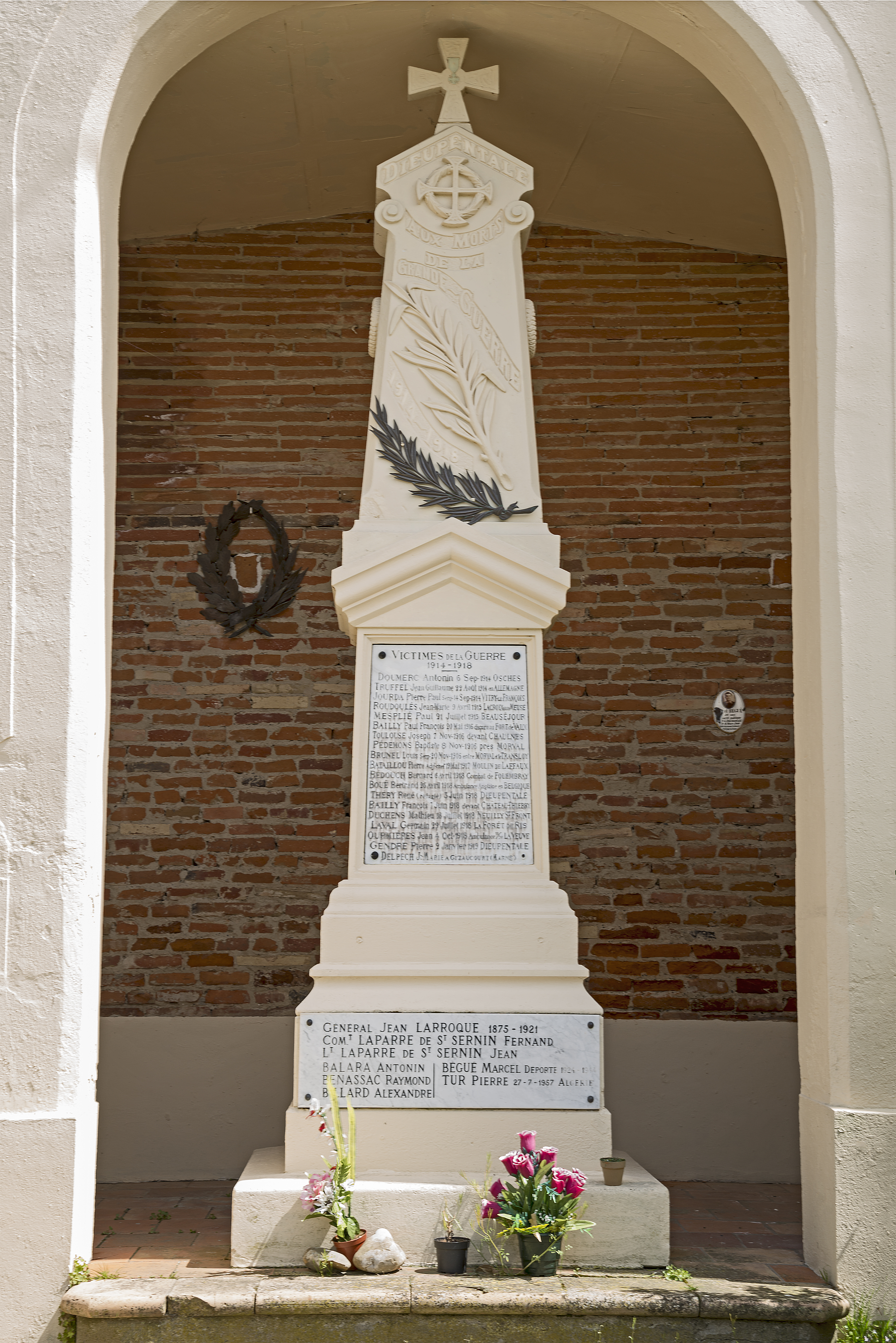
War memorial.

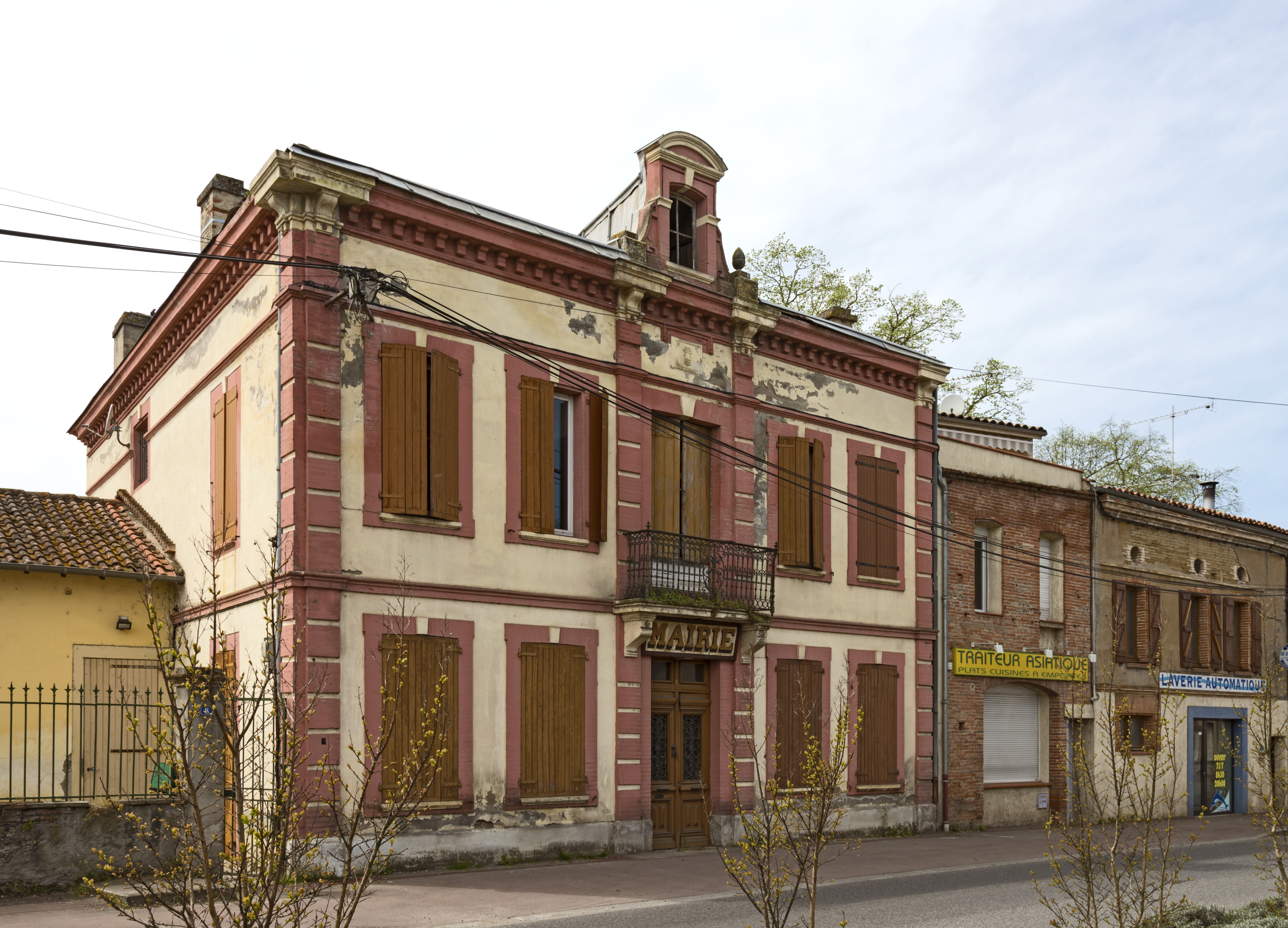
The old town hall.

== See also ==
- Communes of the Tarn-et-Garonne department
