= Canton of Verdun-sur-Garonne =

Coordinates: 43.85°N 1.23°E

The canton of Verdun-sur-Garonne is an administrative division of the Tarn-et-Garonne department, in southern France. At the French canton reorganisation which came into effect in March 2015, it was expanded from 9 to 13 communes. Its seat is in Verdun-sur-Garonne.

It consists of the following communes:

1. Aucamville
2. Beaupuy
3. Bouillac
4. Campsas
5. Canals
6. Dieupentale
7. Fabas
8. Grisolles
9. Mas-Grenier
10. Pompignan
11. Saint-Sardos
12. Savenès
13. Verdun-sur-Garonne
