= Bouillac, Tarn-et-Garonne =

Bouillac
- Commune
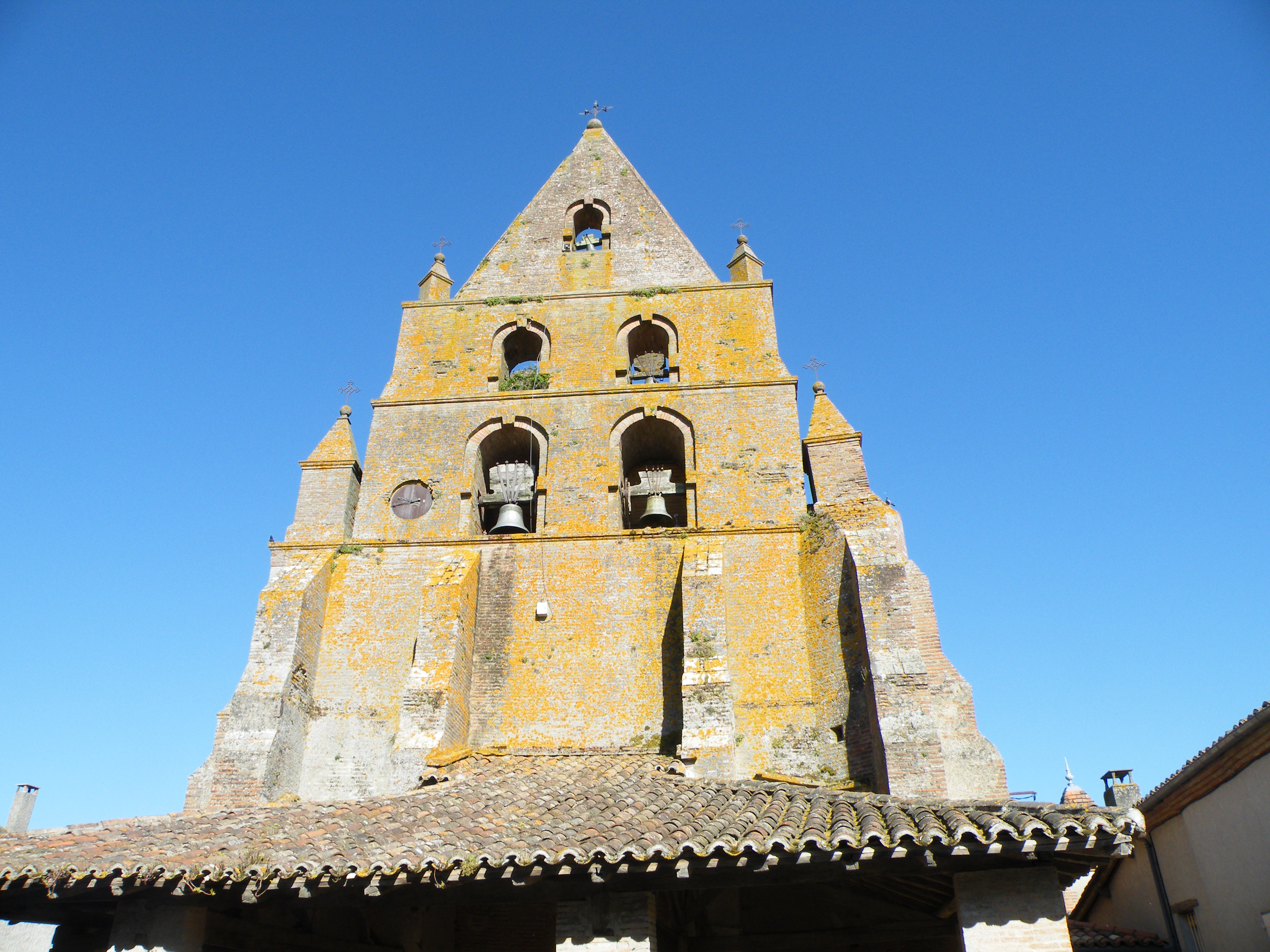
- The bell tower of the church, in Bouillac
- Location of Bouillac
- Location within France Location within Occitanie
- Coordinates: 43°50′36″N 1°07′10″E
- Country: France
- Region: Occitania
- Department: Tarn-et-Garonne
- Arrondissement: Montauban
- Canton: Verdun-sur-Garonne

Government
  - Mayor (2020–2026): Jean-Michel Valette
- Area^{1}: 30.45 km^{2} (11.76 sq mi)
- Elevation: 212 m (696 ft)
- Highest elevation: 253 m (830 ft)
- Lowest elevation: 115 m (377 ft)
- Population (2023): 584
  - Density: 19.2/km^{2} (49.7/sq mi)
- Time zone: UTC+01:00 (CET)
  - Summer (DST): UTC+02:00 (CEST)
- INSEE/Postal code: 82020 /82600
- ^{1} French Land Register data, which excludes lakes, ponds, glaciers > 1 km^{2} (0.386 sq mi or 247 acres) and river estuaries.

Bouillac (French pronunciation: [bujak]; Occitan: Bolhac) is a commune in the Tarn-et-Garonne department in the Occitanie region in southern France.

== See also ==
- Communes of the Tarn-et-Garonne department
