= Canals, Tarn-et-Garonne =

Canals
- Commune
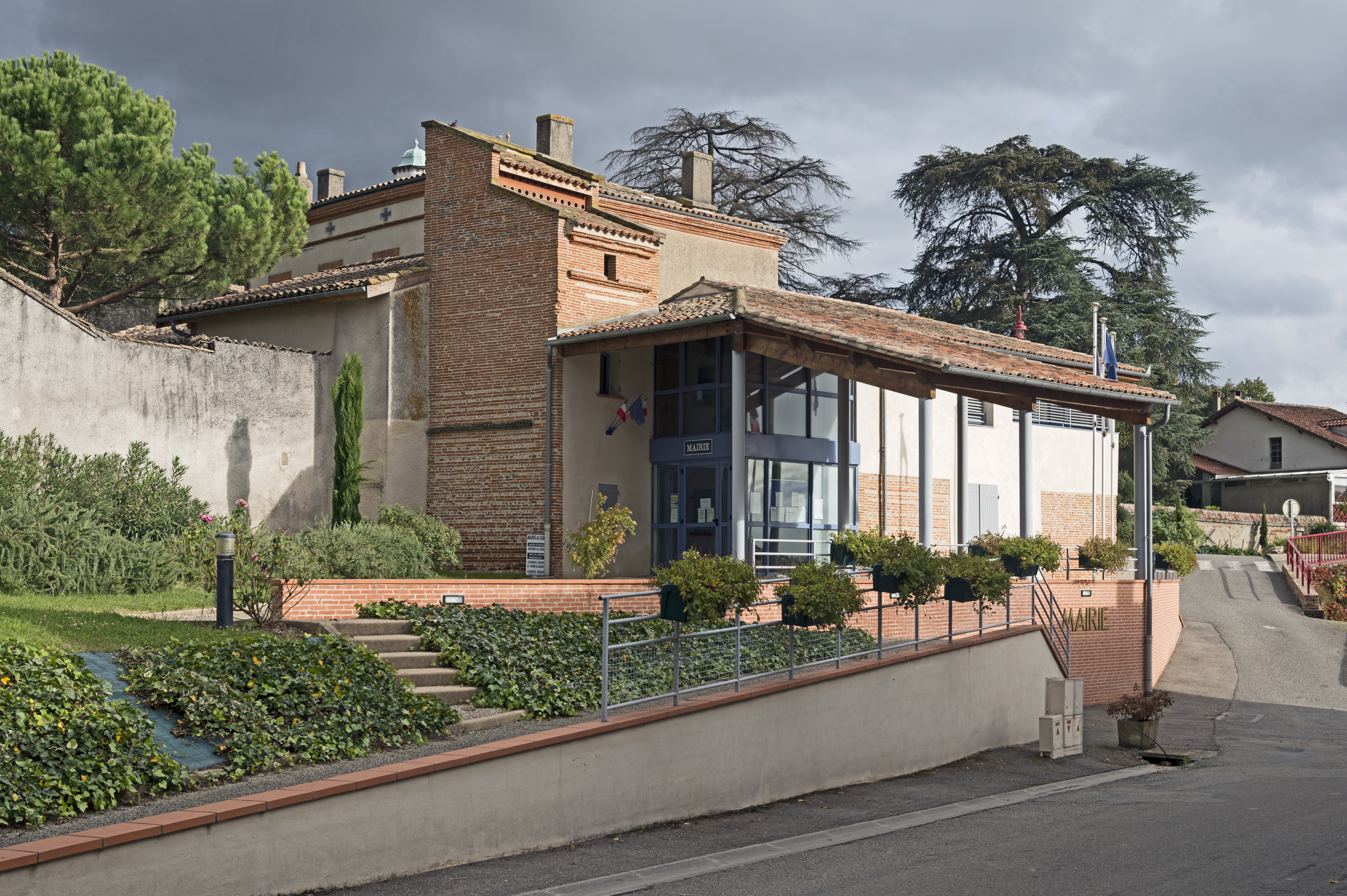
- The town hall of Canals

- Coat of arms
- Location of Canals
- Location within France Location within Occitanie
- Coordinates: 43°51′09″N 1°17′34″E
- Country: France
- Region: Occitania
- Department: Tarn-et-Garonne
- Arrondissement: Montauban
- Canton: Verdun-sur-Garonne

Government
  - Mayor (2021–2026): Sylvie Borel
- Area^{1}: 7.35 km^{2} (2.84 sq mi)
- Elevation: 135 m (443 ft)
- Highest elevation: 159 m (522 ft)
- Lowest elevation: 102 m (335 ft)
- Population (2023): 798
  - Density: 109/km^{2} (281/sq mi)
- Time zone: UTC+01:00 (CET)
  - Summer (DST): UTC+02:00 (CEST)
- INSEE/Postal code: 82028 /82170
- ^{1} French Land Register data, which excludes lakes, ponds, glaciers > 1 km^{2} (0.386 sq mi or 247 acres) and river estuaries.

Canals (French pronunciation: [kanal]) is a commune in the Tarn-et-Garonne department in the Occitanie region in southern France.

== Monument ==
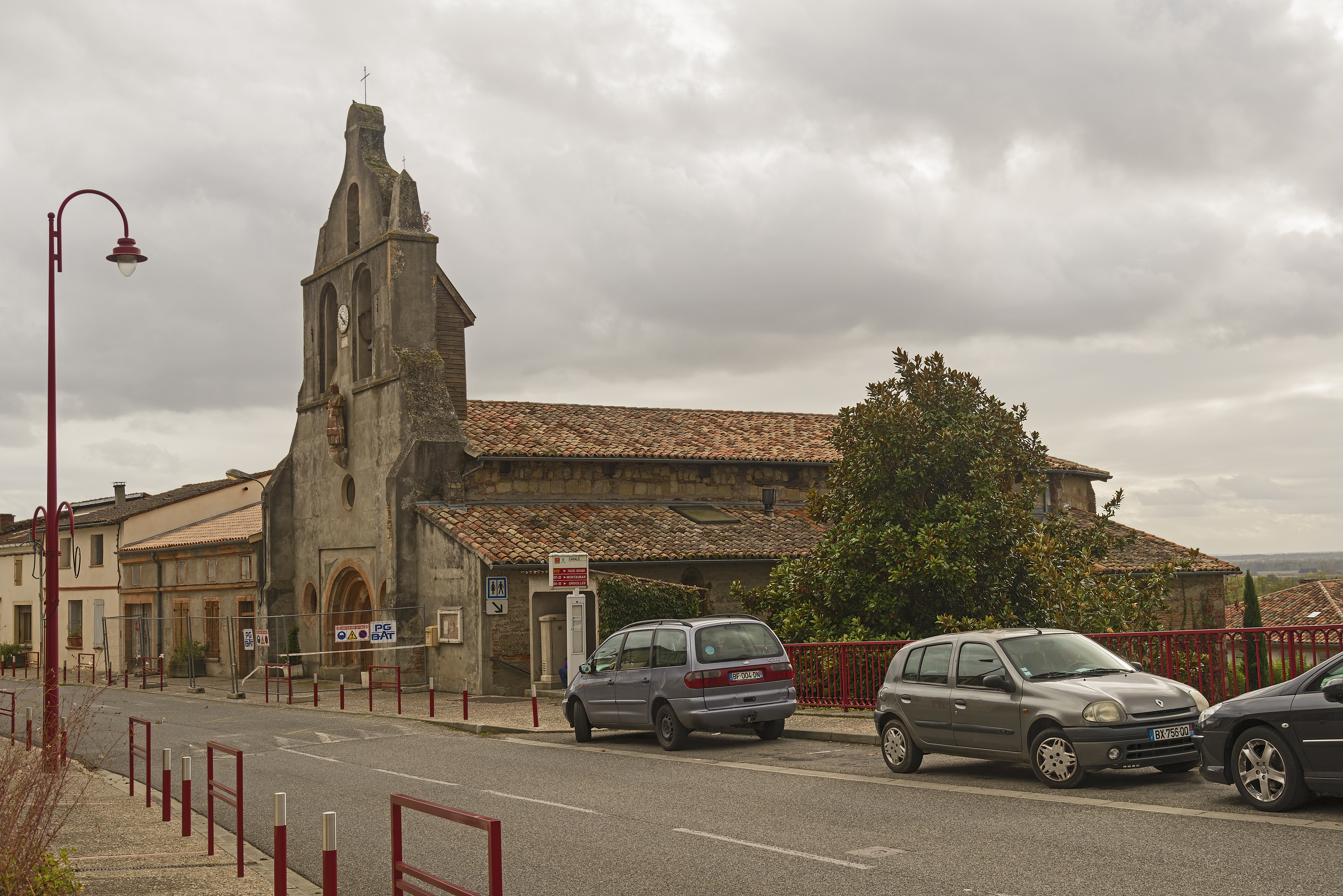
St. Laurent Church

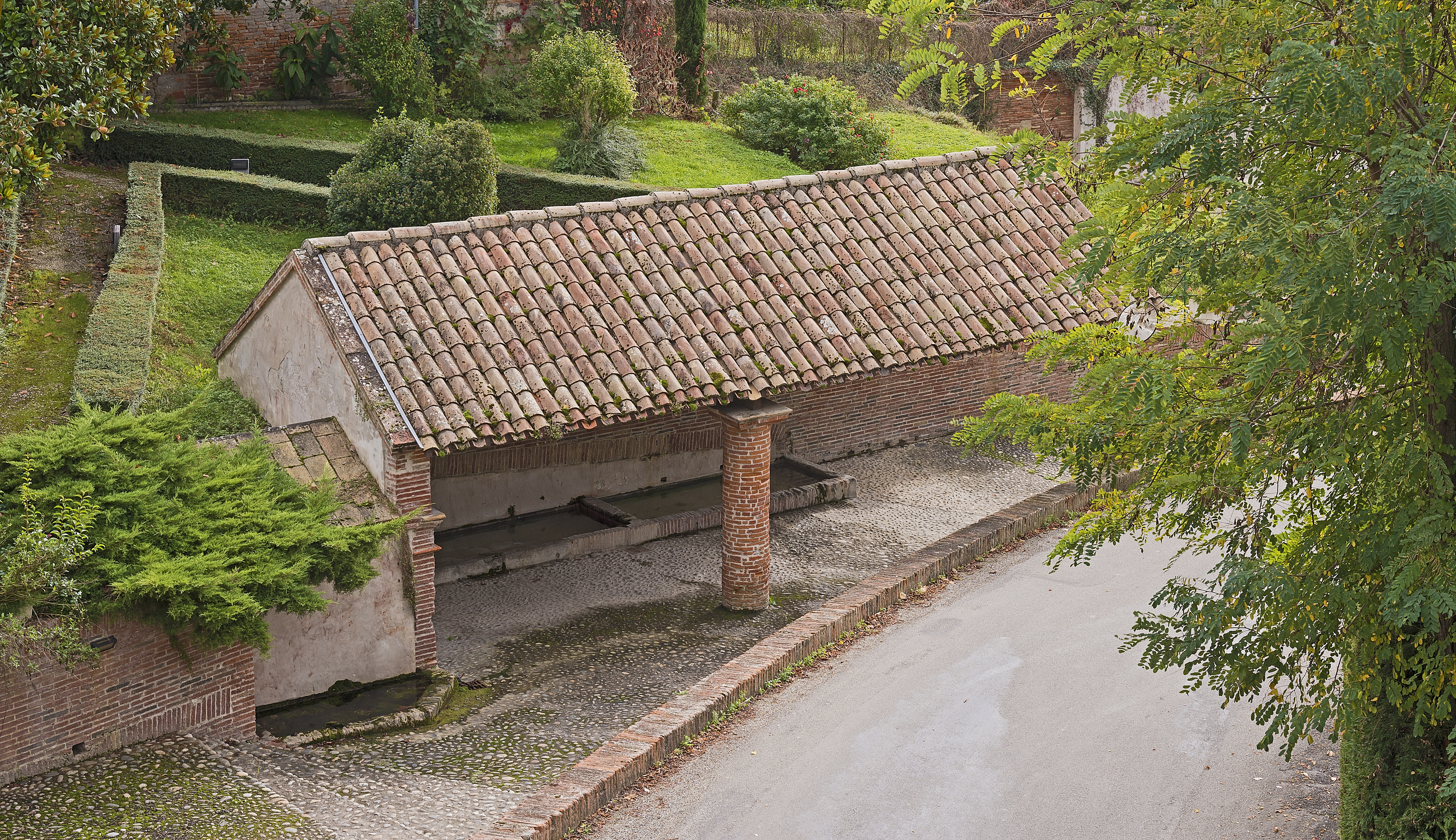
Laundry

== See also ==
- Communes of the Tarn-et-Garonne department
