= Savenès =

- Commune
- Location of Savenès
- Location within France Location within Occitanie
- Coordinates: 43°49′51″N 1°12′05″E
- Country: France
- Region: Occitania
- Department: Tarn-et-Garonne
- Arrondissement: Montauban
- Canton: Verdun-sur-Garonne

Government
  - Mayor (2020–2026): Marie-Christine Coulon
- Area^{1}: 22.57 km^{2} (8.71 sq mi)
- Elevation: 152 m (499 ft)
- Highest elevation: 168 m (551 ft)
- Lowest elevation: 110 m (360 ft)
- Population (2023): 810
  - Density: 36/km^{2} (93/sq mi)
- Time zone: UTC+01:00 (CET)
  - Summer (DST): UTC+02:00 (CEST)
- INSEE/Postal code: 82178 /82600
- ^{1} French Land Register data, which excludes lakes, ponds, glaciers > 1 km^{2} (0.386 sq mi or 247 acres) and river estuaries.

Savenès (French pronunciation: [savnɛs]) is a commune in the Tarn-et-Garonne department in the Occitanie region in southern France.

== See also ==
- Communes of the Tarn-et-Garonne department
