= Verdun-sur-Garonne =

- Commune
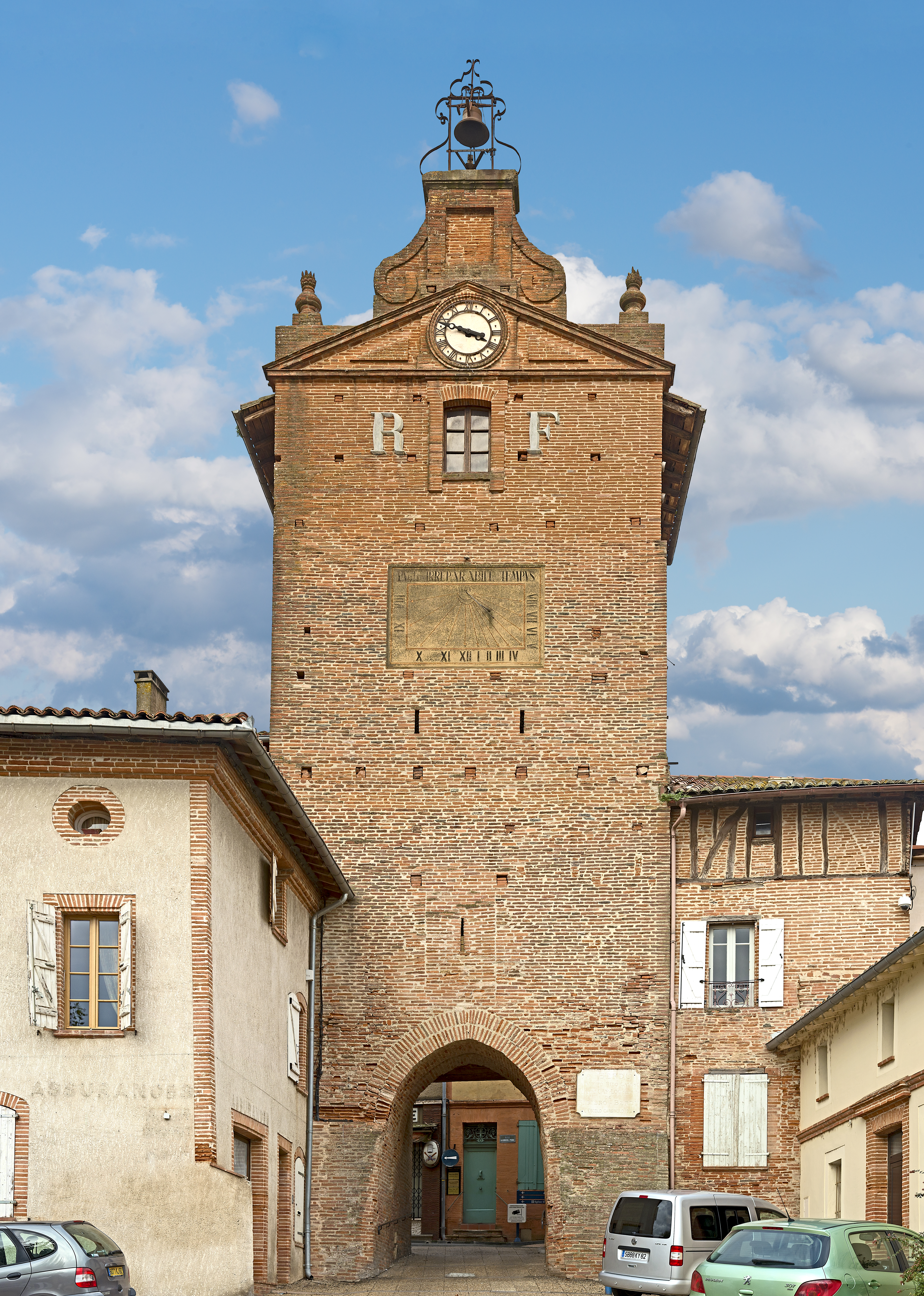
- The clock tower in Verdun-sur-Garonne

- Coat of arms
- Location of Verdun-sur-Garonne
- Location within France Location within Occitanie
- Coordinates: 43°51′14″N 1°14′11″E
- Country: France
- Region: Occitania
- Department: Tarn-et-Garonne
- Arrondissement: Montauban
- Canton: Verdun-sur-Garonne
- Intercommunality: Grand Sud Tarn et Garonne

Government
  - Mayor (2020–2026): Stéphane Tuyeres
- Area^{1}: 36.26 km^{2} (14.00 sq mi)
- Elevation: 110 m (360 ft)
- Highest elevation: 166 m (545 ft)
- Lowest elevation: 90 m (300 ft)
- Population (2023): 4,961
  - Density: 136.8/km^{2} (354.4/sq mi)
- Time zone: UTC+01:00 (CET)
  - Summer (DST): UTC+02:00 (CEST)
- INSEE/Postal code: 82190 /82600
- ^{1} French Land Register data, which excludes lakes, ponds, glaciers > 1 km^{2} (0.386 sq mi or 247 acres) and river estuaries.

Verdun-sur-Garonne (French pronunciation: [vɛʁdœ̃ syʁ ɡaʁɔn], literally Verdun on Garonne; Occitan: Verdun de Garona) is a commune in the Tarn-et-Garonne department in the Occitanie region in southern France.

== Population ==
Historical population
| Year | Pop. | ±% p.a. |
|---|---|---|
| 1968 | 2,370 | — |
| 1975 | 2,353 | −0.10% |
| 1982 | 2,510 | +0.93% |
| 1990 | 2,872 | +1.70% |
| 1999 | 3,067 | +0.73% |
| 2007 | 3,910 | +3.08% |
| 2012 | 4,394 | +2.36% |
| 2017 | 4,764 | +1.63% |
| 2023 | 4,961 | +0.68% |
Source: INSEE

== Monuments ==
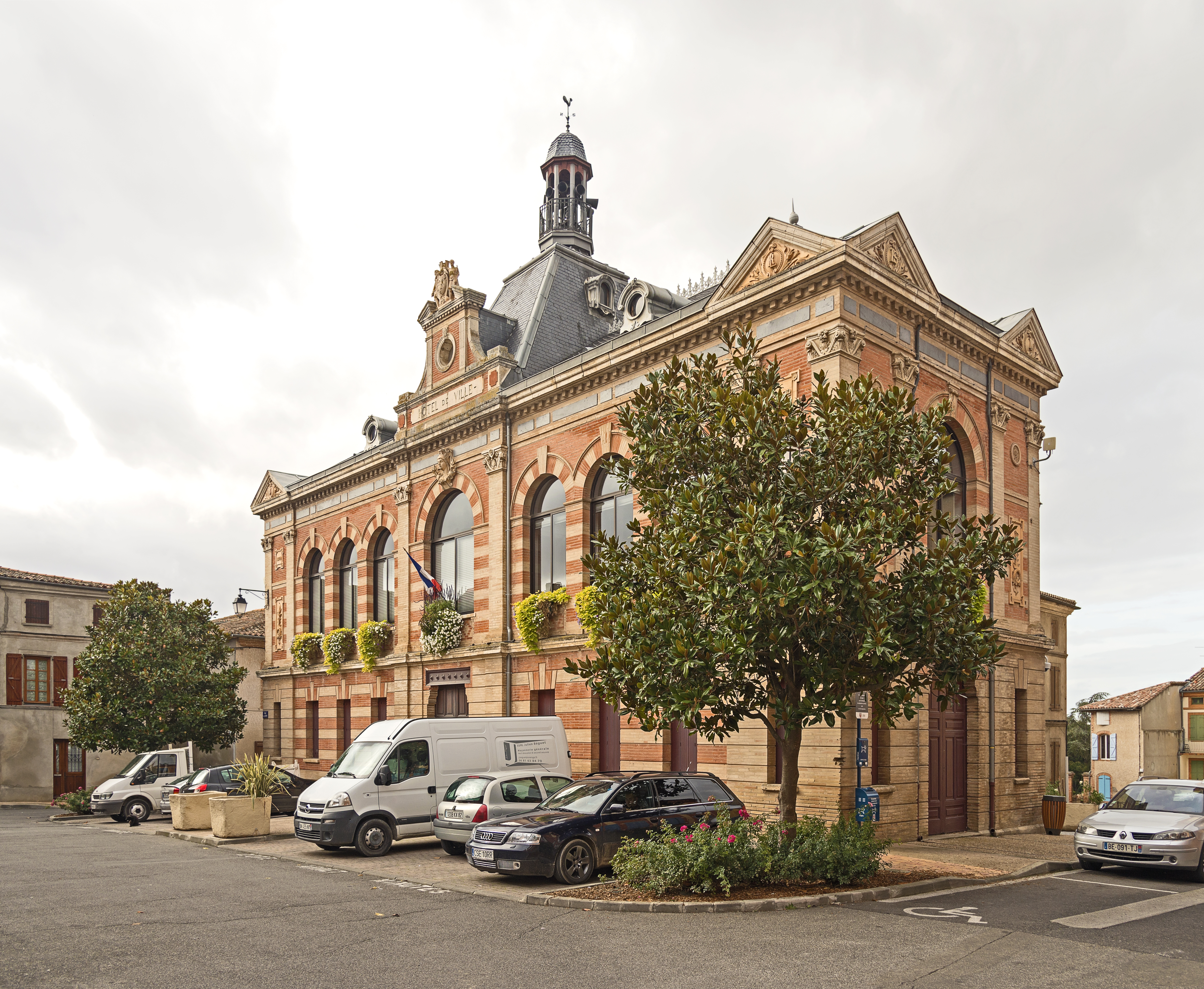
Town Hall

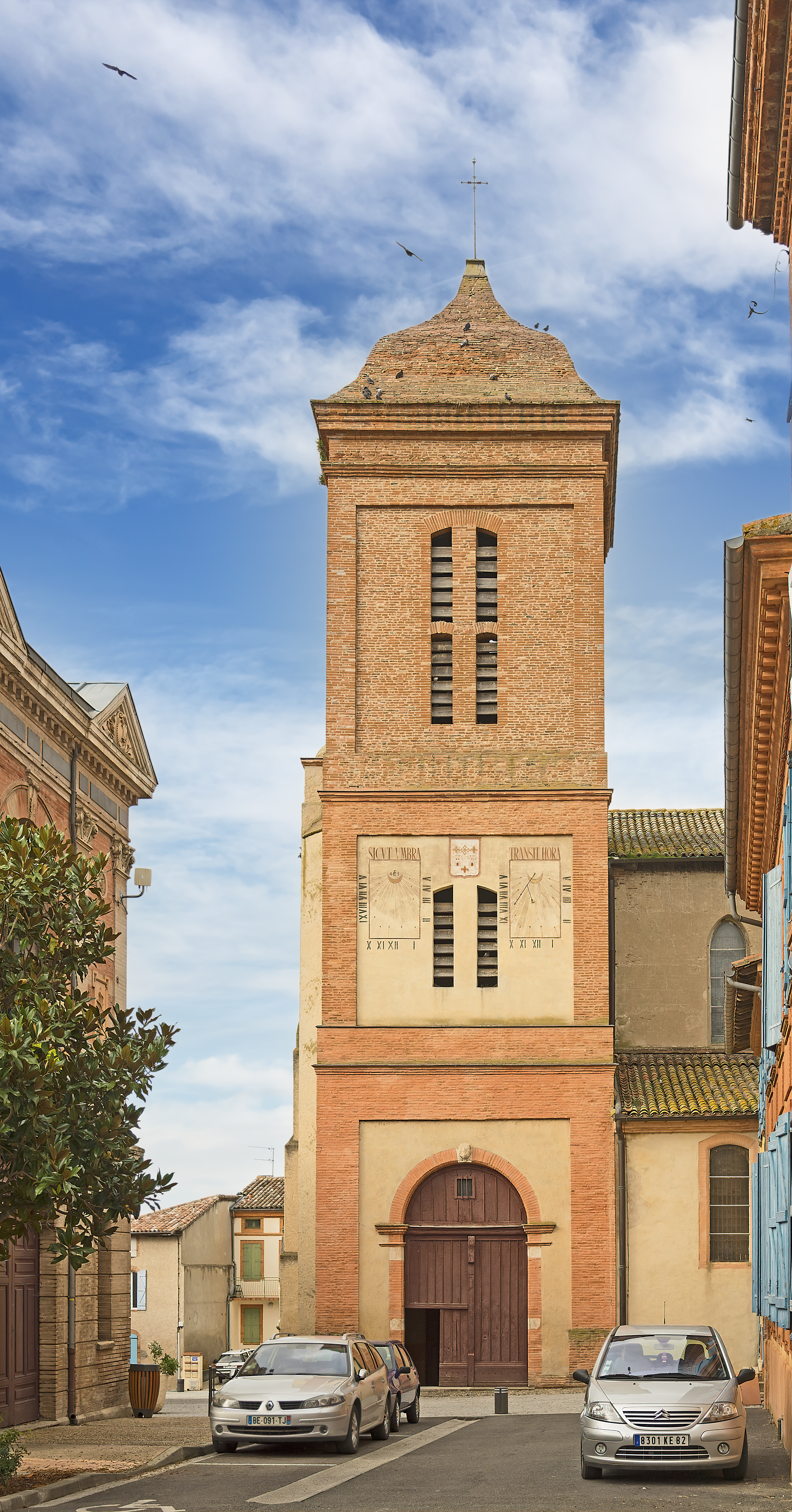
St. Michel Church

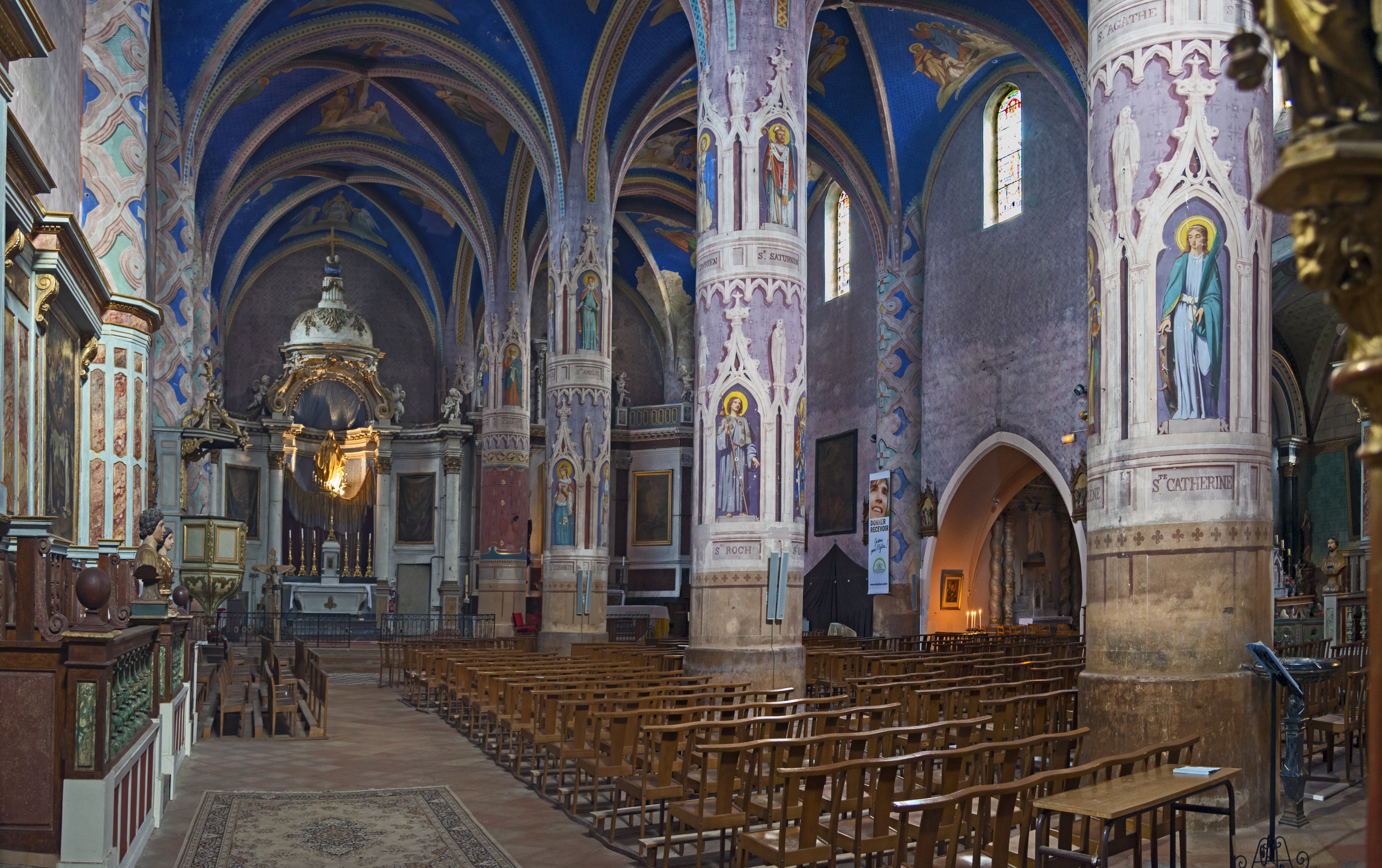
St. Michel Church

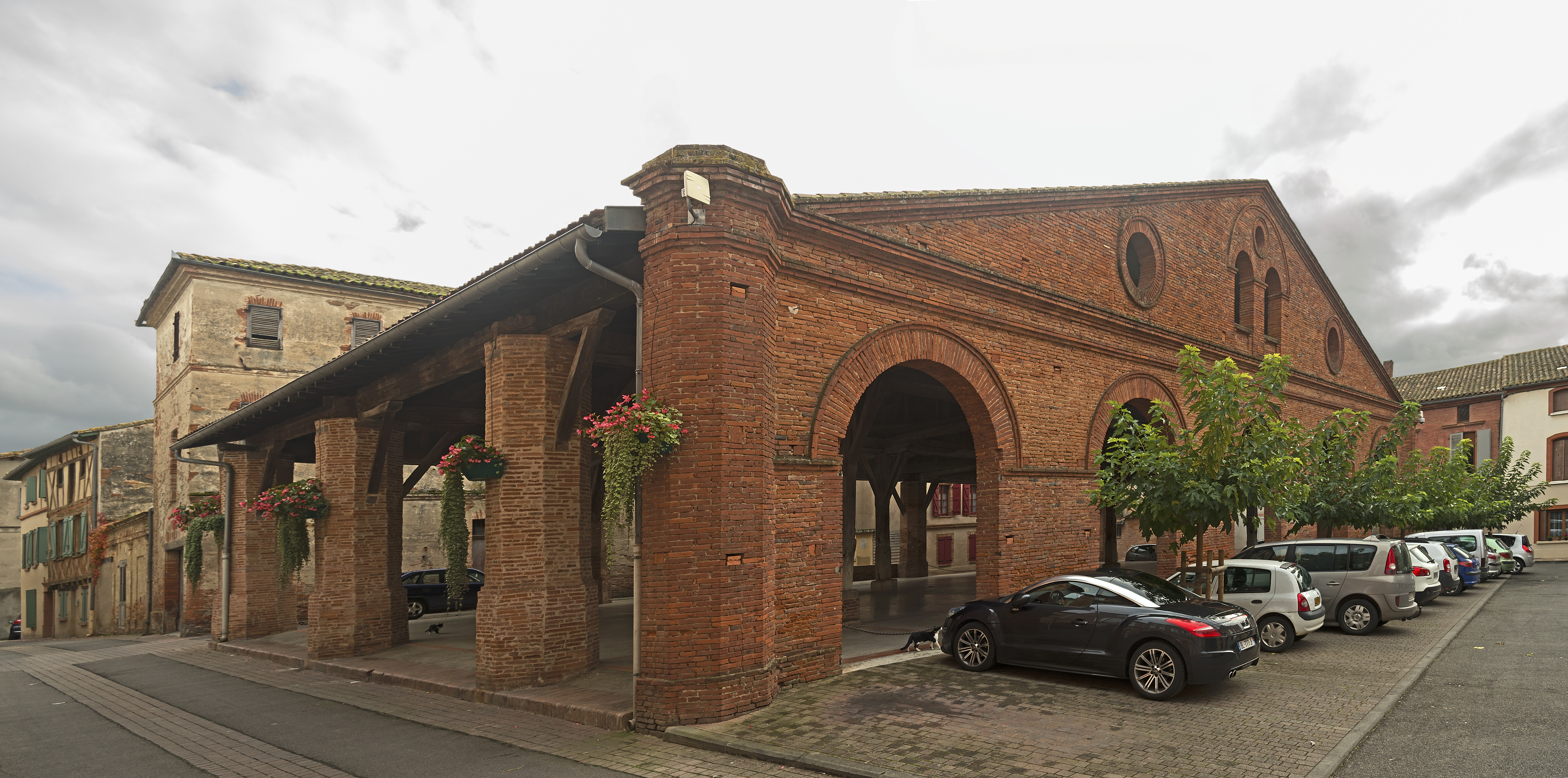
The Market hall.

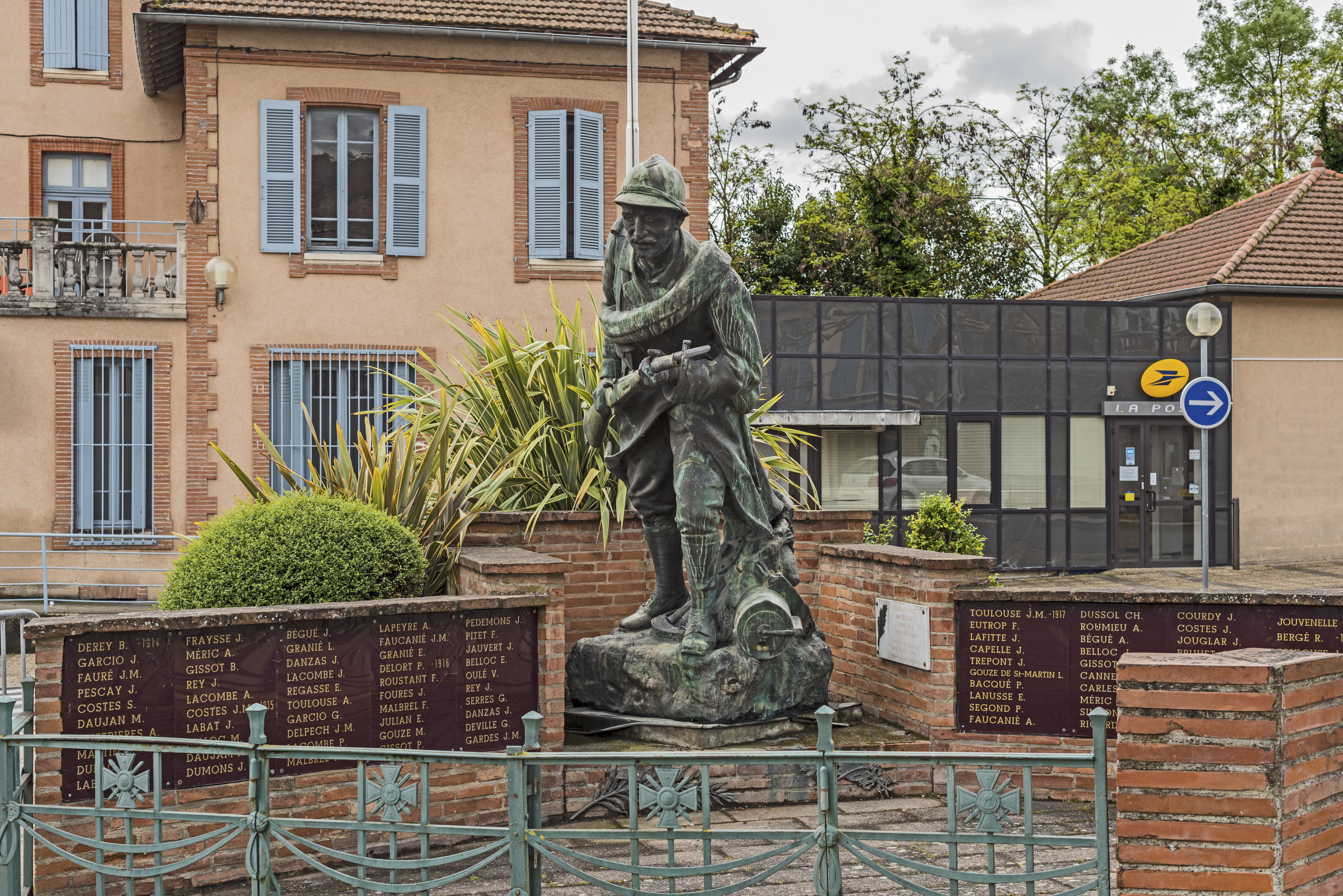
War memorial

== See also ==
- Communes of the Tarn-et-Garonne department
