= Mas-Grenier =

- Commune
- Coat of arms
- Location of Mas-Grenier
- Location within France Location within Occitanie
- Coordinates: 43°53′29″N 1°11′50″E
- Country: France
- Region: Occitania
- Department: Tarn-et-Garonne
- Arrondissement: Montauban
- Canton: Verdun-sur-Garonne
- Intercommunality: CC Grand-Sud Tarn-et-Garonne

Government
  - Mayor (2020–2026): Bernadette Prouet
- Area^{1}: 24.66 km^{2} (9.52 sq mi)
- Elevation: 108 m (354 ft)
- Highest elevation: 174 m (571 ft)
- Lowest elevation: 84 m (276 ft)
- Population (2023): 1,282
  - Density: 51.99/km^{2} (134.6/sq mi)
- Time zone: UTC+01:00 (CET)
  - Summer (DST): UTC+02:00 (CEST)
- INSEE/Postal code: 82105 /82600
- ^{1} French Land Register data, which excludes lakes, ponds, glaciers > 1 km^{2} (0.386 sq mi or 247 acres) and river estuaries.

Mas-Grenier (French pronunciation: [ma(s) ɡʁənje]; Occitan: Le Mas Granièr) is a commune in the Tarn-et-Garonne department in the Occitanie region in southern France.

== See also ==
- Communes of the Tarn-et-Garonne department
