= Aucamville, Tarn-et-Garonne =

Aucamville
- Commune
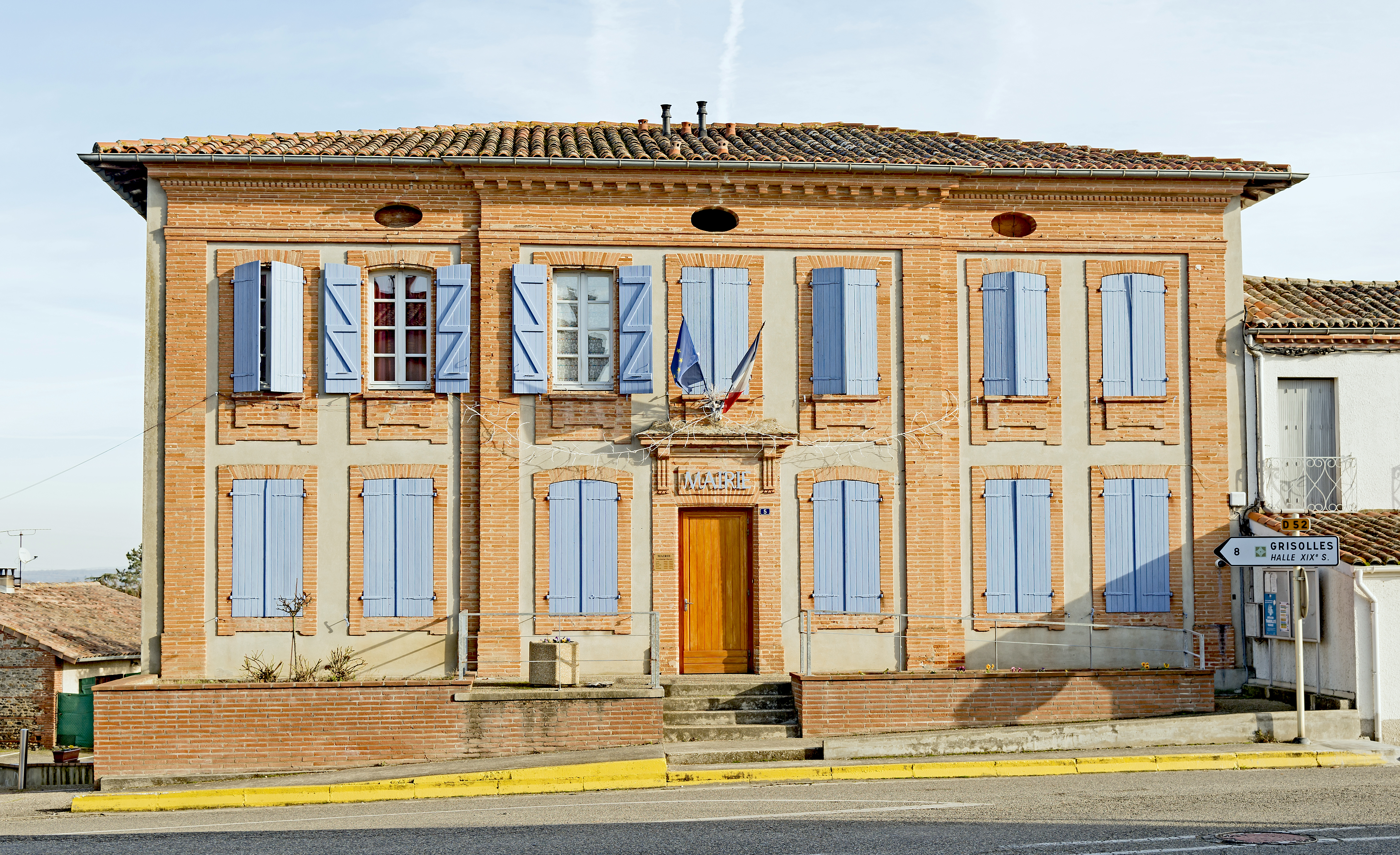
- The town hall of Aucamville

- Coat of arms
- Location of Aucamville
- Location within France Location within Occitanie
- Coordinates: 43°48′14″N 1°12′57″E
- Country: France
- Region: Occitania
- Department: Tarn-et-Garonne
- Arrondissement: Montauban
- Canton: Verdun-sur-Garonne
- Intercommunality: CC Grand Sud Tarn-et-Garonne

Government
  - Mayor (2020–2026): Eric Fraysse
- Area^{1}: 22.91 km^{2} (8.85 sq mi)
- Elevation: 148 m (486 ft)
- Highest elevation: 168 m (551 ft)
- Lowest elevation: 97 m (318 ft)
- Population (2023): 1,562
  - Density: 68.18/km^{2} (176.6/sq mi)
- Time zone: UTC+01:00 (CET)
  - Summer (DST): UTC+02:00 (CEST)
- INSEE/Postal code: 82005 /82600
- ^{1} French Land Register data, which excludes lakes, ponds, glaciers > 1 km^{2} (0.386 sq mi or 247 acres) and river estuaries.

Aucamville (French pronunciation: [okɑ̃vil]; Occitan: Aucamvila) is a commune in the Tarn-et-Garonne department in the Occitanie region in southern France.

== Monuments ==
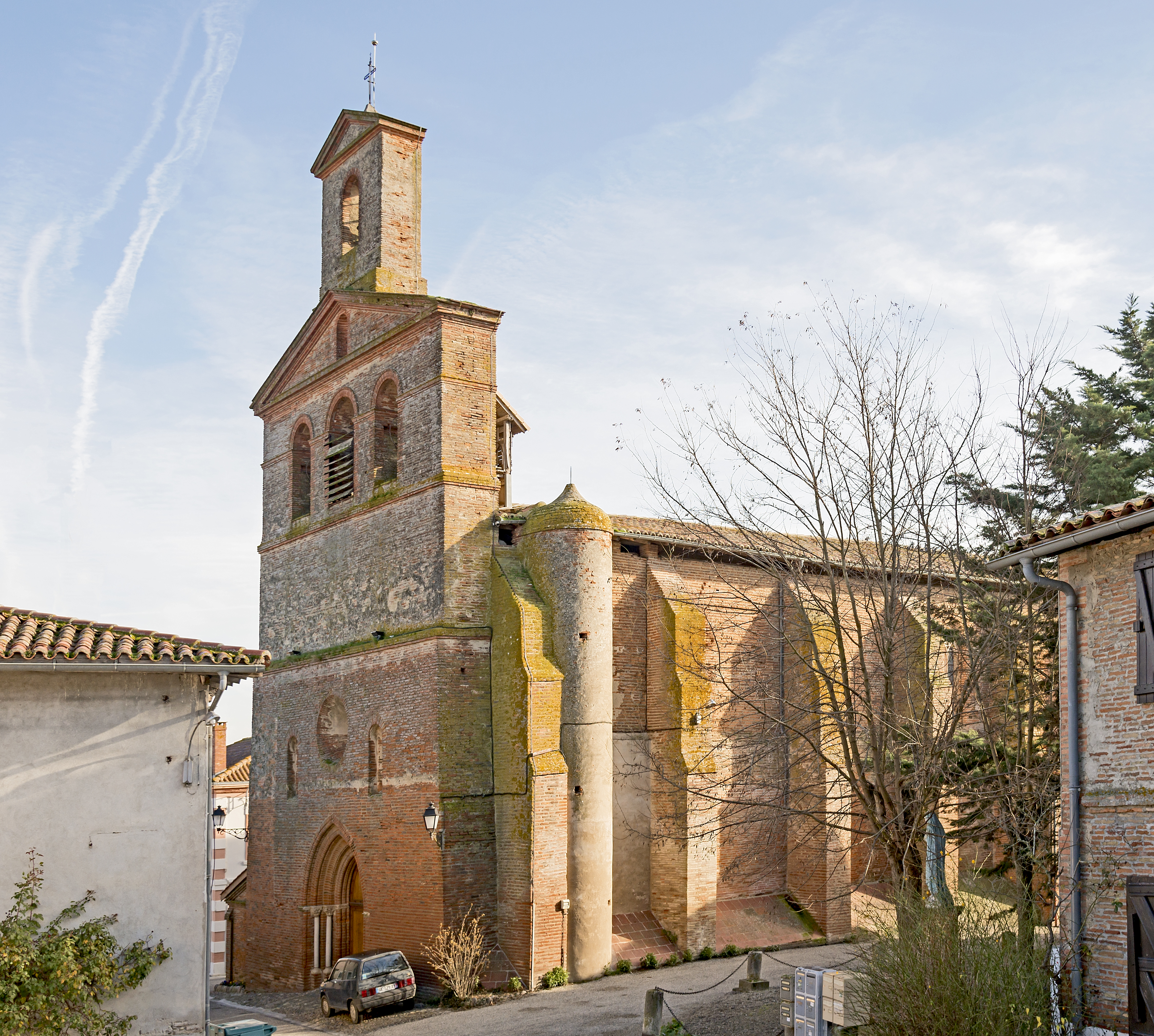
St. Martin church

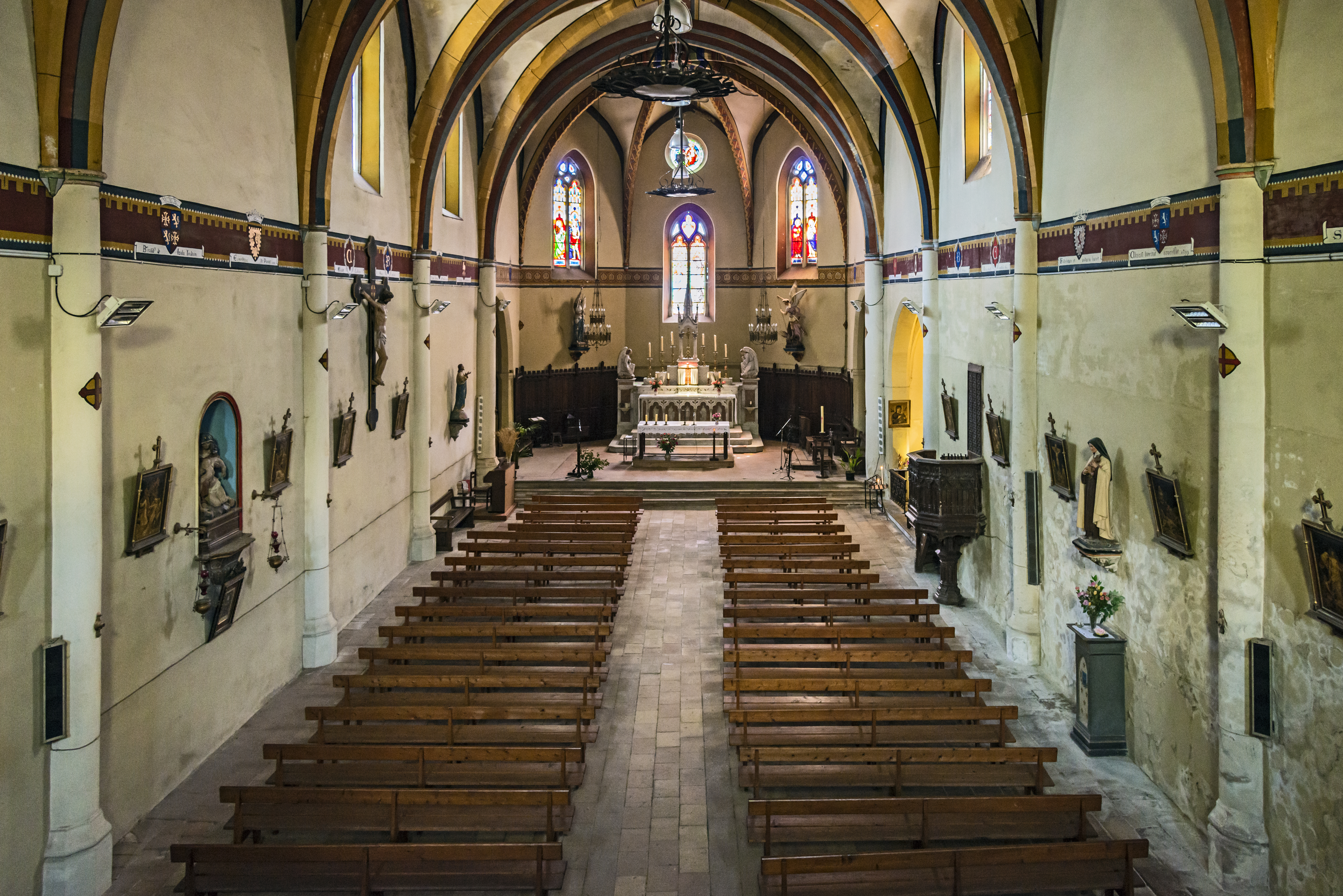
St. Martin church interior

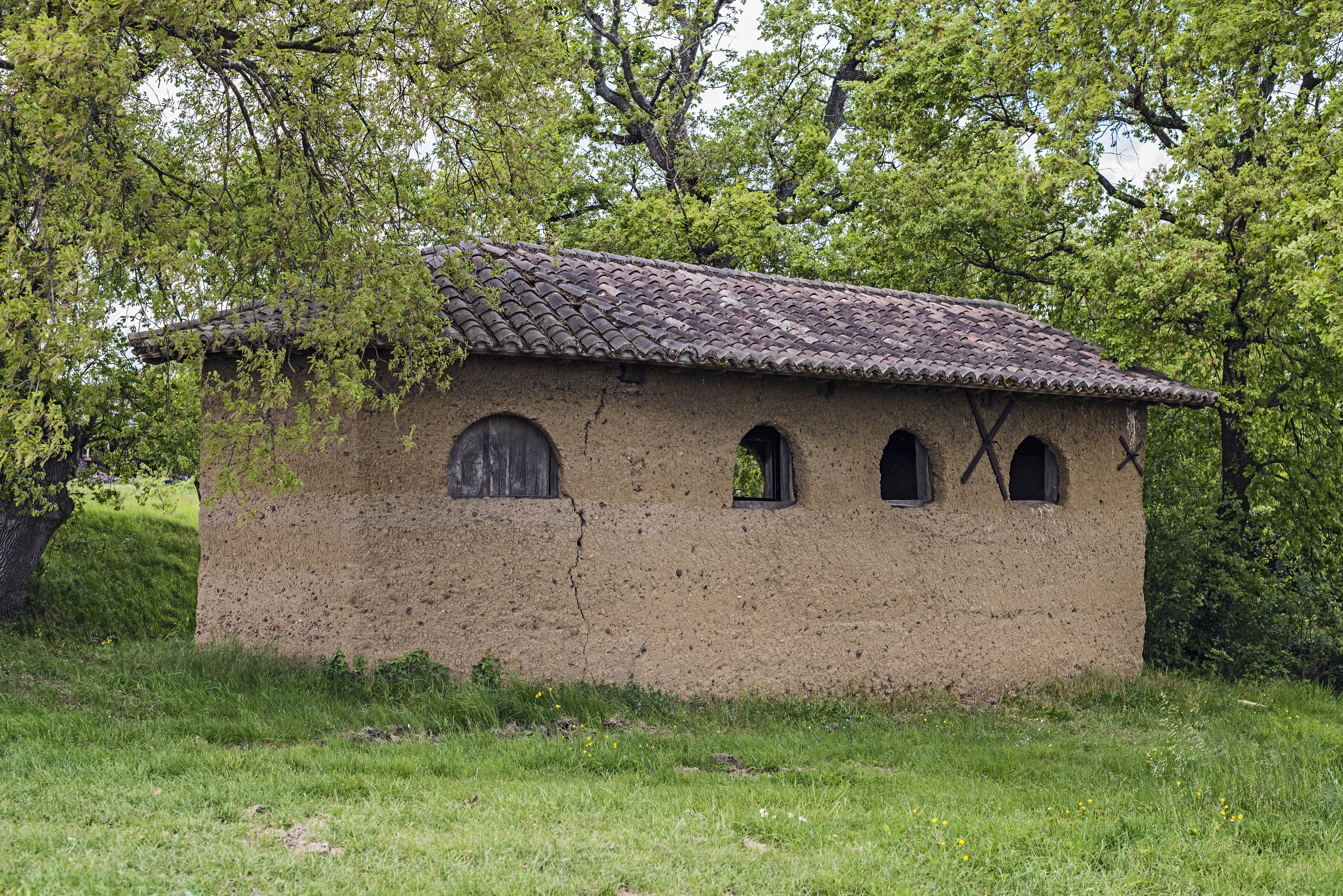
St. John the Baptist chapel.

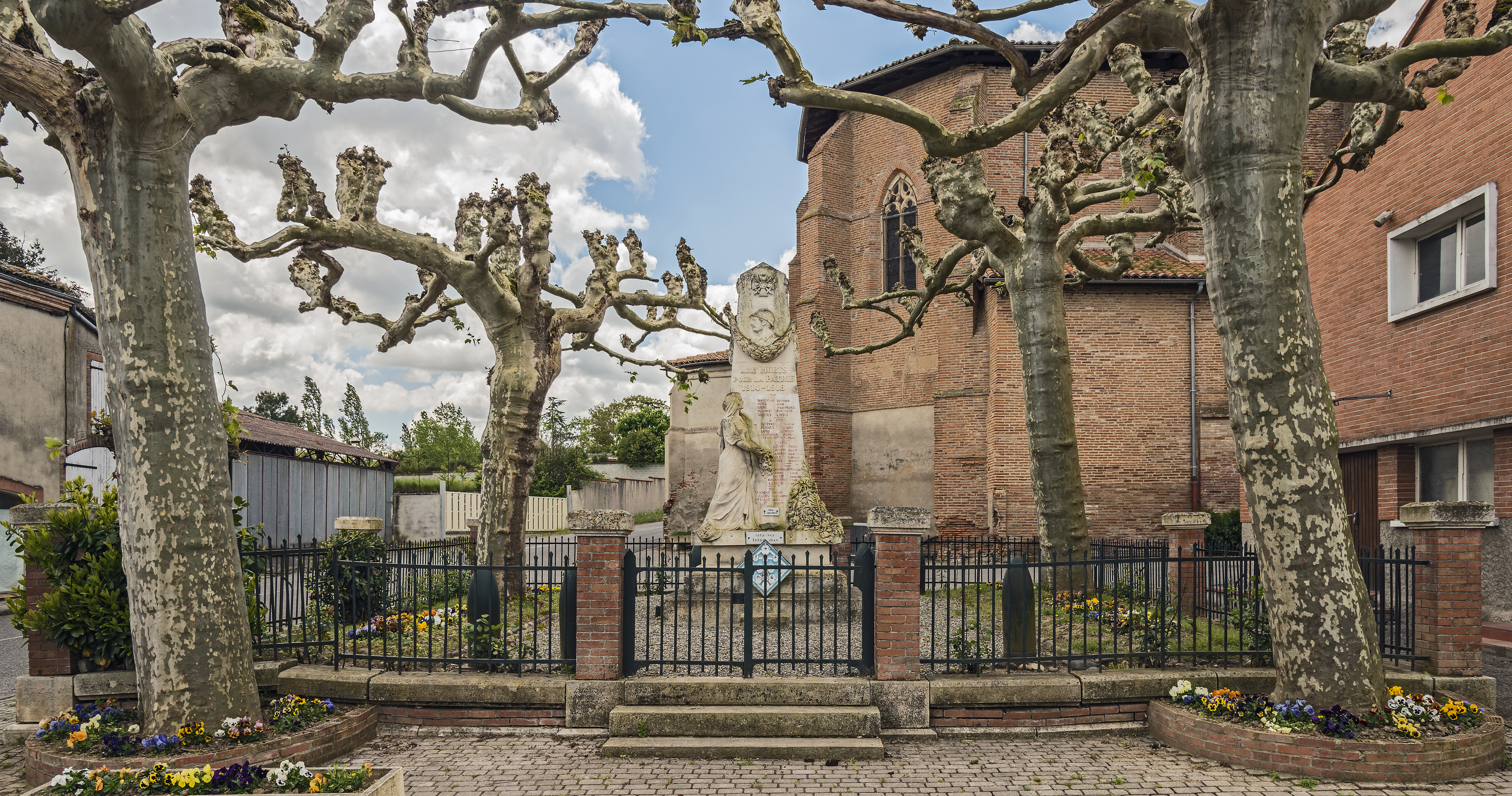
War memorial

== See also ==
- Communes of the Tarn-et-Garonne department
