= Saint-Sardos, Tarn-et-Garonne =

Saint-Sardos
- Commune
- Location of Saint-Sardos
- Location within France Location within Occitanie
- Coordinates: 43°54′03″N 1°08′06″E
- Country: France
- Region: Occitania
- Department: Tarn-et-Garonne
- Arrondissement: Montauban
- Canton: Verdun-sur-Garonne
- Intercommunality: Grand Sud Tarn et Garonne

Government
  - Mayor (2020–2026): Gérard Fénié
- Area^{1}: 26.56 km^{2} (10.25 sq mi)
- Elevation: 145 m (476 ft)
- Highest elevation: 212 m (696 ft)
- Lowest elevation: 99 m (325 ft)
- Population (2023): 1,120
  - Density: 42.2/km^{2} (109/sq mi)
- Time zone: UTC+01:00 (CET)
  - Summer (DST): UTC+02:00 (CEST)
- INSEE/Postal code: 82173 /82600
- ^{1} French Land Register data, which excludes lakes, ponds, glaciers > 1 km^{2} (0.386 sq mi or 247 acres) and river estuaries.

Saint-Sardos (French pronunciation: [sɛ̃ saʁdɔs]; Occitan: Sent Sardòs) is a commune in the Tarn-et-Garonne department in the Occitanie region in southern France.

== See also ==
- Communes of the Tarn-et-Garonne department
