= Canton of Gaillon-Campagne =

Former canton in Upper Normandy

Gaillon-Campagne
- Former canton
- Location of the Canton of Gaillon-Campagne in the Arrondissement of Les Andelys
- Coordinates: 49.14°N 1.26°E
- Country: France
- Region: Normandy
- Department: Eure
- No. of communes: {{{nbcomm}}}
- Established: 1985
- Disbanded: 2015
- Population (2012): 14,587

The Canton of Gaillon-Campagne is a former French canton located in the Eure department in the former region of Upper Normandy (now part of Normandy). It had 14,587 inhabitants (2012). It was established in 1985 as a part of the canton of Gaillon. Its seat was the town Gaillon, itself not part of the canton.

== History ==
List of successive departmental councilors
Period		Name	Party	Other mandates	References
1985	1987 (death)	Bernard Chandelier	DVD - app.UDF	Former resistant Mayor of Aubevoye	
1987	1994	Jacques Davoust	PS then DVG	Assistant Deputy mayor of La Croix-Saint-Leufroy; Municipal councilor of Berson	
1994	2008	Claude Nachtergaele	DVG	Mayor of Saint-Aubin-sur-Gaillon; Vice-president of the General Council	
2008	2015	Jean-Remi Ermont	PS	Secondary school teacher Mayor of Fontaine-Heudebourg	

== Composition ==
The canton comprised the following communes:

- Ailly
- Autheuil-Authouillet
- Bernieres-sur-Seine
- Cailly-sur-Eure
- Champenard
- La Croix-Saint-Leufroy
- Écardenville-sur-Eure
- Fontaine-Bellenger
- Fontaine-Heudebourg
- Heudreville-sur-Eure
- Saint-Aubin-sur-Gaillon
- Saint-Étienne-sous-Bailleul
- Saint-Julien-de-la-Liègue
- Saint-Pierre-de-Bailleul
- Saint-Pierre-la-Garenne
- Sainte-Barbe-sur-Gaillon
- Tosny
- Venables
- Vieux-Villez
- Villers-sur-le-Roule

== Demography ==
Historical population
Year	Pop.	±%
1962	6,453	—
1968	6,913	+7.1%
1975	7,763	+12.3%
1982	9,497	+22.3%
1990	11,128	+17.2%
1999	12,122	+8.9%
2006	13,416	+10.7%
2011	14,406	+7.4%
2012	14,587	+1.3%

== See also ==
- Cantons of the Eure department
