= Paul-Jean-Baptiste Poret de Morvan =

French general during the Napoleonic Wars (1777–1834)

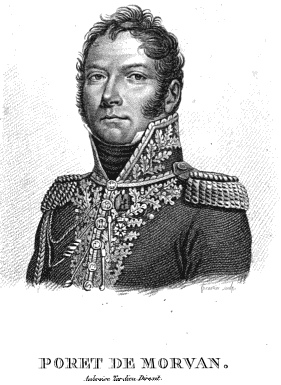
- General Baron Poret de Morvan.
- Born: 14 April 1777; Saint-Étienne-sous-Bailleul, France
- Died: 17 February 1834 (aged 56); Chartres, France
- Burial place: Père Lachaise Cemetery in Paris
- Military career
- Allegiance: (France) French First Republic, (France) First French Empire, Bourbon Restoration
- Branch: Artillery, then Infantry
- Service years: 1793–1829
- Rank: General of Brigade
- Conflicts: French Revolutionary Wars; Napoleonic Wars
- Awards: Knight, later Baron of the Empire
- Other work: General Inspector for Infantry

Paul-Jean-Baptiste Poret de Morvan (French pronunciation: [pɔl ʒɑ̃ batist pɔʁɛ də mɔʁvɑ̃]; 14 April 1777 – 17 February 1834), baron of the Empire, was a French officer during the French Revolutionary Wars and Napoleonic Wars, who rose to the rank of general.

== Early career during the Revolutionary Wars ==
Joining the army as a volunteer artillerist during the War of the First Coalition, age sixteen, Poret de Morvan was subsequently commissioned to the French revolutionary "Army of Italy" (1799). Holding the rank of adjutant, he received a first combat wound at the battle of Sassello, on April 15, 1800. He was promoted to second lieutenant, before being sent to serve in the Santo Domingo expeditionary corps, where he fought against the Santo Domingo rebellion and was wounded in action. After the death of the expeditionary corps commander, general of division Charles Leclerc, Poret de Morvan was among the men who accompanied the general's body back to France. Promoted to the rank of first lieutenant in 1803, he was integrated in the Foot Grenadier Guards regiment of the then Consular, later Imperial Guard.

== Napoleonic Wars ==
Pursuing his career in the foot grenadier guards, Poret de Morvan took part to the 1805-1807 campaigns of the Grande Armée during the War of the Third Coalition and War of the Fourth Coalition, then fought in the 1809 campaign against Austria during the War of the Fifth Coalition. He was sent to Spain in 1810, where he remained until the next year. He was created a knight of the Empire at the beginning of 1812 and was made a baron one year later. A general of brigade from August 1813, he fought with distinction at Bautzen and played a significant part at the battle of Leipzig, covering the retreat of the army. Back in France in 1814, Poret de Morvan was entrusted with the mission of creating a "Young Guard" division, then took part to the fighting in Champagne, where he was wounded again. Later that year he took part to the defense of Paris against the forces of the Sixth Coalition.

During the "Hundred Days", Poret de Morvan rallied to Napoleon and was given command of the 3rd Foot Grenadier Guards regiment, two battalions, with a complement of 1,164 officers and men. Poret de Morvan led his men in combat at the battle of Ligny. He directly led his 1st battalion during the final attack of the Guard at the Battle of Waterloo. Placed in the front line during this epic action, Poret de Morvan and his men were noted for their gallantry but were also exposed to the most murderous fire from enemy artillery and musketry, resulting in losses of 58% for the entire regiment during this battle.

After the 1815 Bourbon Restoration, he was imprisoned for joining Napoleon during the "Hundred Days", but was released under an amnesty in 1817. In 1829, he was given the position of general inspector for infantry.

== Recognition ==
General Poret de Morvan died on February 17, 1834, aged 56 and is buried at the Père Lachaise Cemetery in Paris.

The name Poret de Morvan is inscribed under the Arc de Triomphe in Paris.

== Sources ==
- (in French) Fierro, Alfredo; Palluel-Guillard, André; Tulard, Jean - "Histoire et Dictionnaire du Consulat et de l'Empire”, Éditions Robert Laffont, ISBN 2-221-05858-5
- (in French) Sokolov, Oleg. L'armée de Napoléon, Éditions Commios, ISBN 2-9518364-1-4
- (in French) Tulard, Jean - "Dictionnaire Napoléon”; volume 2, Librairie Artème Fayard, 1999, ISBN 2-213-60485-1
