= Écardenville =

Écardenville may refer to two communes in the Eure department in northern France:

- Écardenville-la-Campagne
- Écardenville-sur-Eure
