= Venables, Eure =

Venables
- Part of Les Trois Lacs

- Coat of arms
- Location of Venables
- Location within France Location within Normandy
- Coordinates: 49°12′00″N 1°17′47″E
- Country: France
- Region: Normandy
- Department: Eure
- Arrondissement: Les Andelys
- Canton: Gaillon
- Commune: Les Trois Lacs
- Area^{1}: 14.86 km^{2} (5.74 sq mi)
- Elevation: 125 m (410 ft)
- Highest elevation: 138 m (453 ft)
- Lowest elevation: 8 m (26 ft)
- Population (2025): 850
  - Density: 57/km^{2} (150/sq mi)
- Time zone: UTC+01:00 (CET)
  - Summer (DST): UTC+02:00 (CEST)
- Postal code: 27940
- ^{1} French Land Register data, which excludes lakes, ponds, glaciers > 1 km^{2} (0.386 sq mi or 247 acres) and river estuaries.

Venables (French pronunciation: [vənabl]) is a former commune of the Eure department in Normandy in northern France. On 1 January 2017, in a merge with Tosny and Bernières-sur-Seine (the seat of the commune) it became part of the new commune Les Trois Lacs.

== History ==
The village of Venables dates back about 7,000 years. It is situated at the northernmost point of the Madrie Plateau, at an altitude of 124 meters above sea level. The soil consists of alluvium, white chalk, clay, and sand. It overlooks the meandering of the Seine River and is built at the crossroads coming from Les Andelysto the north, Gaillon to the east, Louviers to the south, while the western border of the village is protected by the banks of the Seine.

Venables comprises the main village and several hamlets within an area of 14.87 km^{2} (5.74 sq mi). The main village is located at the top of the hill and centers around the town church. It contains the village elementary school and La Mairie (town hall). The hamlets include La Mare (Hamlet of the pond) located in the valley below the main village; La Rive (Hamlet on the River Bank) located along the banks of the Seine; Lormais which is nestled between the Seine and the hills; Moulin a Vent (Hamlet of the Windmill) located at the edge of the Madrie Plateau; Val d'Ailly (Hamlet of the Ailly Valley) where only a 16th-century manor house and its surrounding farm remain which was a residence of the Charadas families and Mangin (a French naval officer at the turn of the century); and lastly Fontaine-La-Verte (Hamlet of the Green Fountain) which derives its name from the many springs which flow through the flowering ground cover.

== Population ==
Historical population

Year	Pop.	±% p.a.
1793	880	—
1800	807	−1.23%
1806	876	+1.38%
1821	839	−0.29%
1831	803	−0.44%
1836	827	+0.59%
1841	842	+0.36%
1846	796	−1.12%
1851	746	−1.29%
1856	696	−1.38%
1861	674	−0.64%
1866	646	−0.85%
1872	629	−0.44%
1876	602	−1.09%
1881	578	−0.81%
1886	548	−1.06%
1891	493	−2.09%
1896	478	−0.62%

Year	Pop.	±% p.a.
1901	453	−1.07%
1906	465	+0.52%
1911	389	−3.51%
1921	356	−0.88%
1926	343	−0.74%
1931	302	−2.51%
1936	347	+2.82%
1946	350	+0.09%
1954	370	+0.70%
1962	346	−0.83%
1968	400	+2.45%
1975	419	+0.67%
1982	587	+4.93%
1990	702	+2.26%
1999	708	+0.09%
2006	776	+1.32%
2018	782	+0.06%

Source: EHESS and INSEE

Église Notre-Dame, Rue de l'Êglise, Venables

Mairie de Venables (town hall), 1 Place de la Libéracion, Venables

== See also ==
- Communes of the Eure department
