= Riffaud =

Riffaud is a surname. Notable people with the surname include:

- Madeleine Riffaud (1924–2024), French poet
- René Riffaud (1898–2007), French WWI soldier
