= Clef Vallée d'Eure =

- Commune
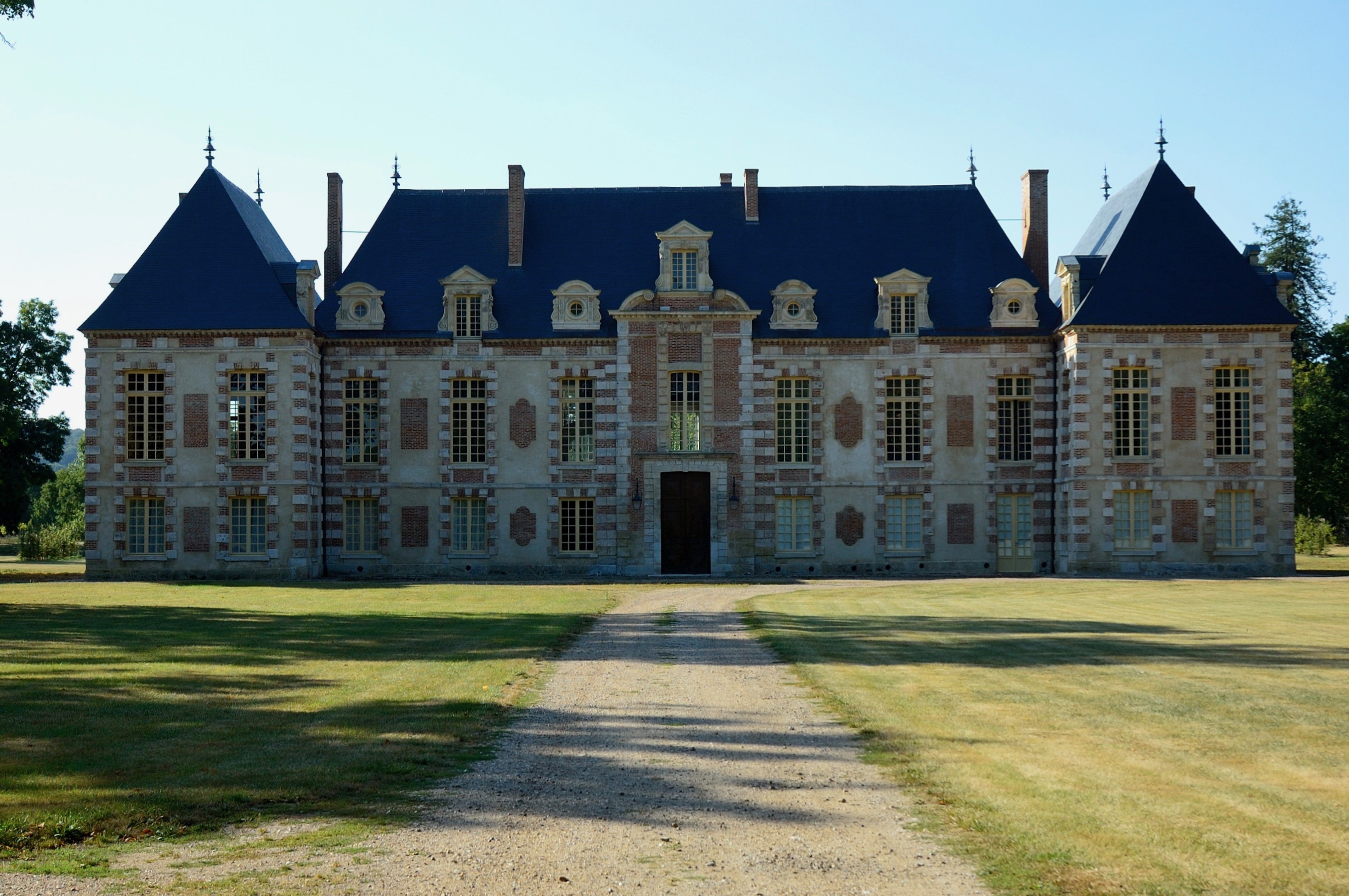
- The chateau of La Croix-Saint-Leufroy
- Location of Clef Vallée d'Eure
- Location within France Location within Normandy
- Coordinates: 49°06′32″N 1°14′35″E
- Country: France
- Region: Normandy
- Department: Eure
- Arrondissement: Les Andelys
- Canton: Gaillon
- Intercommunality: CA Seine-Eure

Government
  - Mayor (2023–2026): Ollivier Lepinteur
- Area^{1}: 25.59 km^{2} (9.88 sq mi)
- Population (2023): 2,490
  - Density: 97.3/km^{2} (252/sq mi)
- Time zone: UTC+01:00 (CET)
  - Summer (DST): UTC+02:00 (CEST)
- INSEE/Postal code: 27191 /27490
- ^{1} French Land Register data, which excludes lakes, ponds, glaciers > 1 km^{2} (0.386 sq mi or 247 acres) and river estuaries.

Clef Vallée d'Eure (French pronunciation: [kle vale dœʁ]) is a commune in the department of Eure, northern France. The municipality was established on 1 January 2016 by merger of the former communes of La Croix-Saint-Leufroy, Écardenville-sur-Eure and Fontaine-Heudebourg.

== Population ==
Population data refer to the commune in its geography as of January 2025.

Historical population
Year	Pop.	±% p.a.
1968	1,174	—
1975	1,245	+0.84%
1982	1,685	+4.42%
1990	1,864	+1.27%
1999	2,108	+1.38%
2007	2,254	+0.84%
2012	2,376	+1.06%
2017	2,533	+1.29%
2023	2,490	−0.28%
Source: INSEE

== See also ==
- Communes of the Eure department
