= Bernières-sur-Seine =

- Part of Les Trois Lacs
- Location of Bernières-sur-Seine
- Location within France Location within Normandy
- Coordinates: 49°14′02″N 1°20′30″E
- Country: France
- Region: Normandy
- Department: Eure
- Arrondissement: Les Andelys
- Canton: Gaillon
- Commune: Les Trois Lacs
- Area^{1}: 6.65 km^{2} (2.57 sq mi)
- Elevation: 15 m (49 ft)
- Highest elevation: 37 m (121 ft)
- Lowest elevation: 7 m (23 ft)
- Population (2018): 371
  - Density: 55.8/km^{2} (144/sq mi)
- Time zone: UTC+01:00 (CET)
  - Summer (DST): UTC+02:00 (CEST)
- Postal code: 27700
- ^{1} French Land Register data, which excludes lakes, ponds, glaciers > 1 km^{2} (0.386 sq mi or 247 acres) and river estuaries.

Bernières-sur-Seine (French pronunciation: [bɛʁnjɛʁ syʁ sɛn]; lit. 'Bernières-on-Seine') is a former commune in the Eure department in Normandy in northern France. On 1 January 2017, it was merged into the new commune Les Trois Lacs.

== See also ==
- Communes of the Eure department
