= Les Trois Lacs =

- Commune
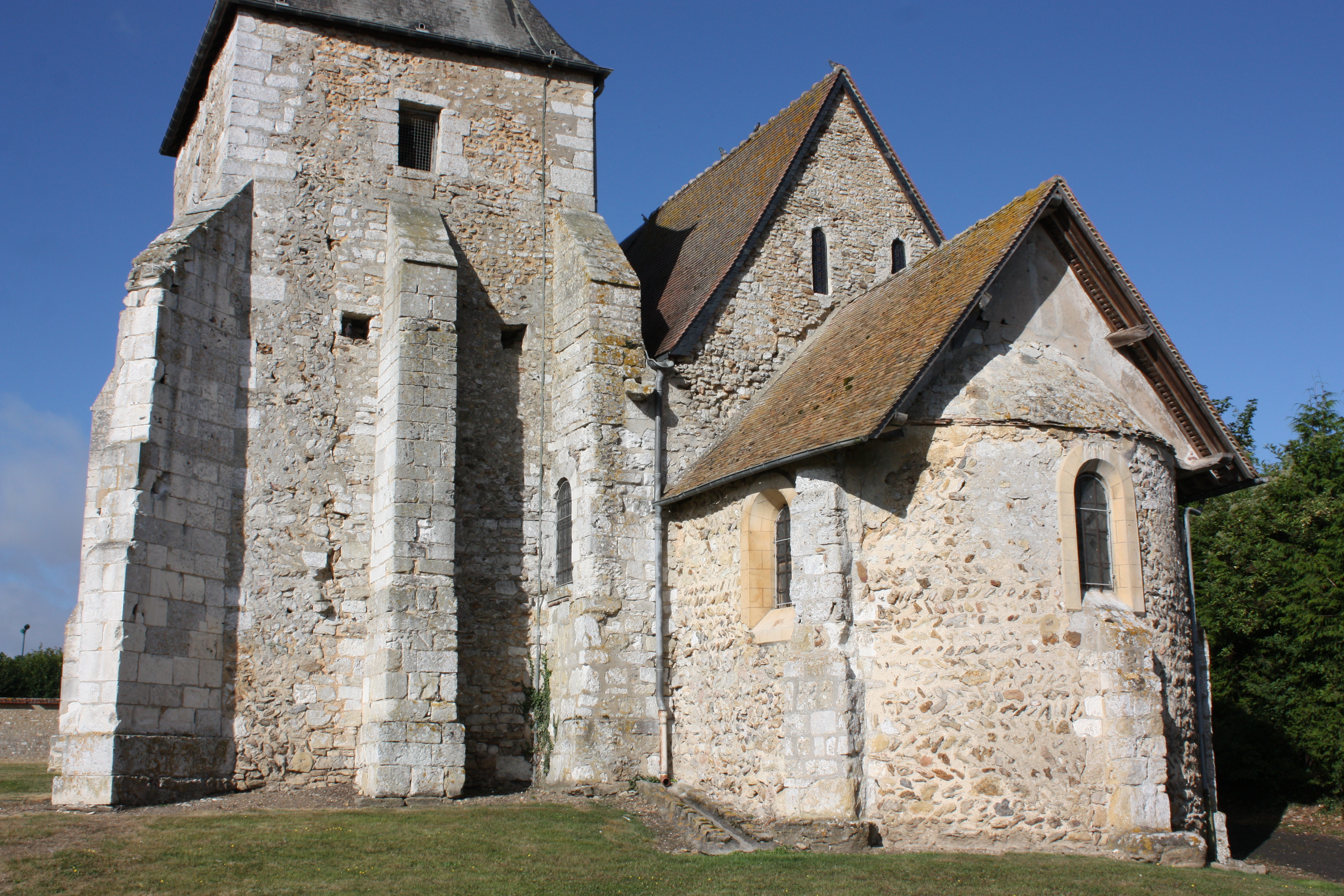
- The church in Venables
- Location of Les Trois Lacs
- Location within France Location within Normandy
- Coordinates: 49°12′00″N 1°17′46″E
- Country: France
- Region: Normandy
- Department: Eure
- Arrondissement: Les Andelys
- Canton: Gaillon
- Intercommunality: CA Seine-Eure

Government
  - Mayor (2020–2026): Joris Benier
- Area^{1}: 36.53 km^{2} (14.10 sq mi)
- Population (2023): 1,735
  - Density: 47.50/km^{2} (123.0/sq mi)
- Time zone: UTC+01:00 (CET)
  - Summer (DST): UTC+02:00 (CEST)
- INSEE/Postal code: 27058 /27940
- ^{1} French Land Register data, which excludes lakes, ponds, glaciers > 1 km^{2} (0.386 sq mi or 247 acres) and river estuaries.

Les Trois Lacs (French pronunciation: [le tʁwɑ lak]; lit. 'The Three Lakes') is a commune in the department of Eure, northern France. The municipality was established on 1 January 2017 in a merge of the former communes of Venables, Bernières-sur-Seine (the seat), and Tosny.

== See also ==
- Communes of the Eure department
