= Saint-Aubin-sur-Gaillon =

- Commune
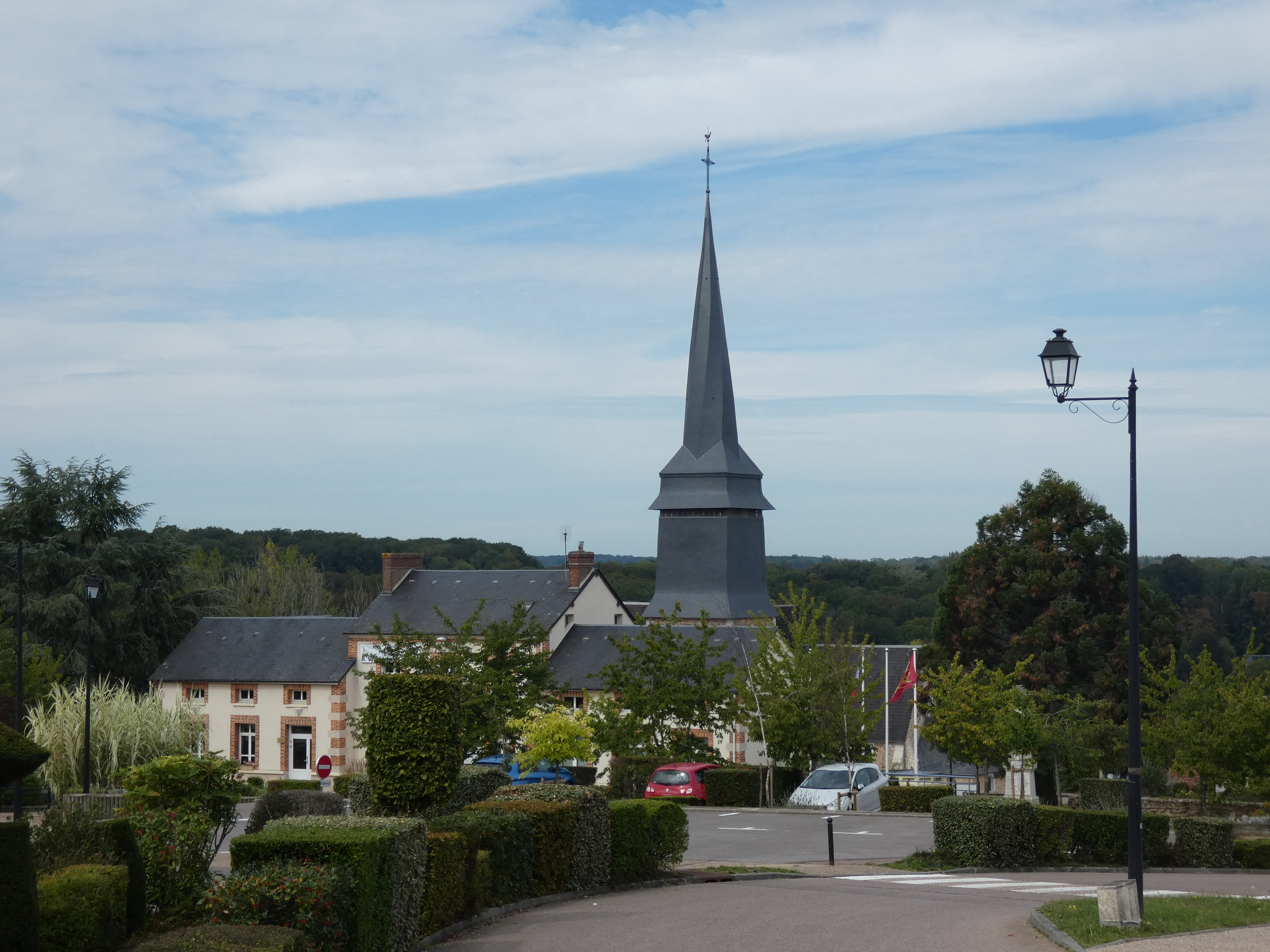
- The church in Saint-Aubin-sur-Gaillon
- Location of Saint-Aubin-sur-Gaillon
- Location within France Location within Normandy
- Coordinates: 49°08′53″N 1°19′49″E
- Country: France
- Region: Normandy
- Department: Eure
- Arrondissement: Les Andelys
- Canton: Gaillon
- Intercommunality: CA Seine-Eure

Government
  - Mayor (2020–2026): Philippe Doom
- Area^{1}: 19.46 km^{2} (7.51 sq mi)
- Elevation: 130 m (430 ft)
- Highest elevation: 143 m (469 ft)
- Lowest elevation: 16 m (52 ft)
- Population (2023): 2,153
  - Density: 110.6/km^{2} (286.5/sq mi)
- Time zone: UTC+01:00 (CET)
  - Summer (DST): UTC+02:00 (CEST)
- INSEE/Postal code: 27517 /27600
- ^{1} French Land Register data, which excludes lakes, ponds, glaciers > 1 km^{2} (0.386 sq mi or 247 acres) and river estuaries.

Saint-Aubin-sur-Gaillon (French pronunciation: [sɛ̃t‿obɛ̃ syʁ ɡajɔ̃], literally Saint-Aubin on Gaillon) is a commune in the Eure department in Normandy in northern France.

== Population ==
Historical population
Year	Pop.	±% p.a.
1968	662	—
1975	888	+4.29%
1982	1,135	+3.57%
1990	1,249	+1.20%
1999	1,403	+1.30%
2007	1,631	+1.90%
2012	1,782	+1.79%
2017	1,989	+2.22%
2023	2,153	+1.33%
Source: INSEE

== See also ==
- Communes of the Eure department
