= Aubevoye =

- Part of Le Val-d'Hazey
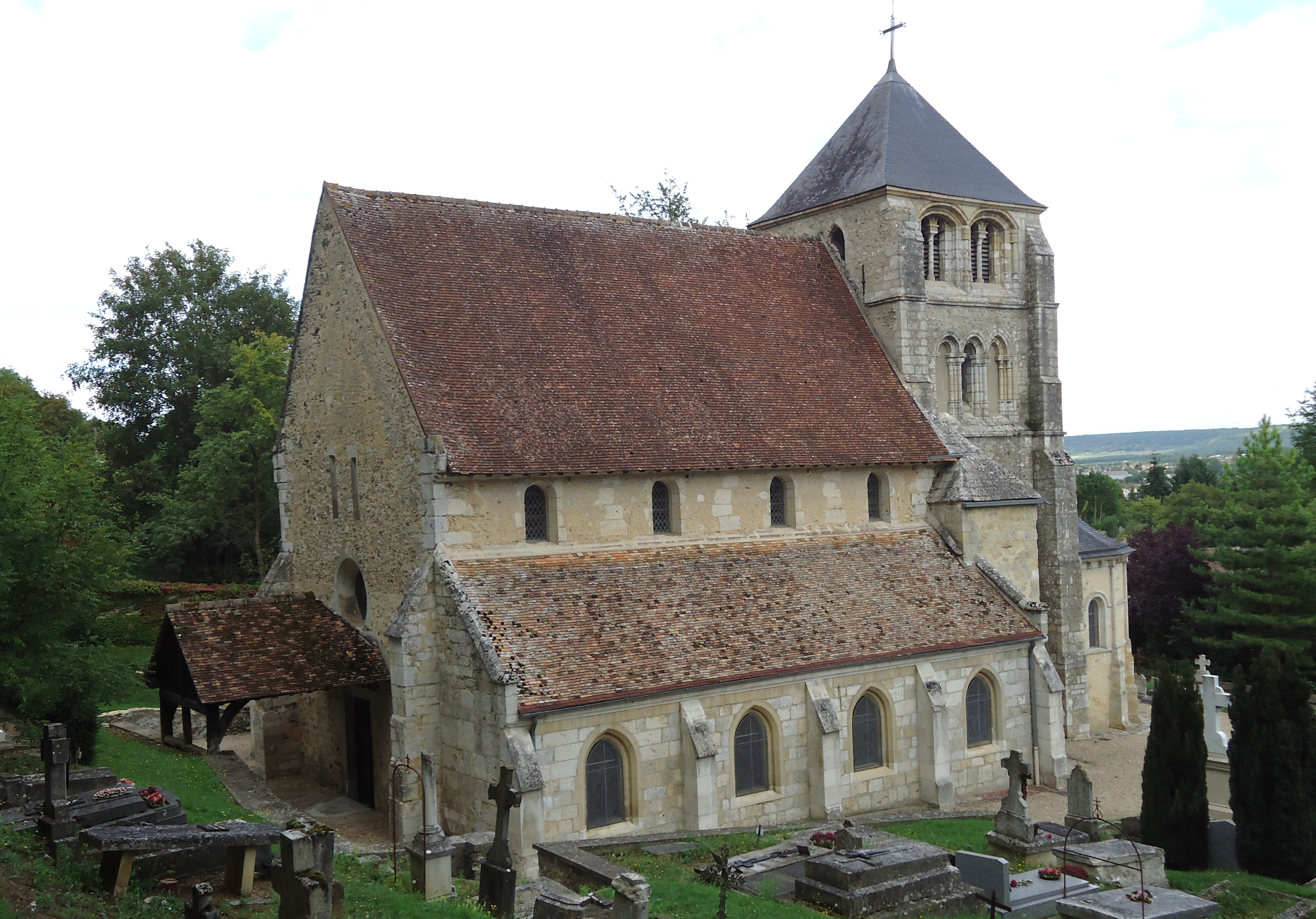

- Coat of arms
- Location of Aubevoye
- Location within France Location within Normandy
- Coordinates: 49°10′28″N 1°20′07″E
- Country: France
- Region: Normandy
- Department: Eure
- Arrondissement: Les Andelys
- Canton: Gaillon
- Commune: Le Val-d'Hazey
- Area^{1}: 7.63 km^{2} (2.95 sq mi)
- Elevation: 20 m (66 ft)
- Highest elevation: 129 m (423 ft)
- Lowest elevation: 8 m (26 ft)
- Population (2022): 4,670
  - Density: 612/km^{2} (1,590/sq mi)
- Time zone: UTC+01:00 (CET)
  - Summer (DST): UTC+02:00 (CEST)
- Postal code: 27940
- ^{1} French Land Register data, which excludes lakes, ponds, glaciers > 1 km^{2} (0.386 sq mi or 247 acres) and river estuaries.

Aubevoye (French pronunciation: [obvwa]) is a former commune in the Eure department in Normandy in northern France. On 1 January 2016, it was merged into the new commune of Le Val-d'Hazey.

== Population ==
Historical population

| Year | Pop. | ±% p.a. |
|---|---|---|
| 1793 | 660 | — |
| 1800 | 581 | −1.80% |
| 1806 | 536 | −1.33% |
| 1821 | 513 | −0.29% |
| 1831 | 473 | −0.81% |
| 1836 | 516 | +1.76% |
| 1841 | 523 | +0.27% |
| 1846 | 552 | +1.09% |
| 1851 | 523 | −1.07% |
| 1856 | 506 | −0.66% |
| 1861 | 556 | +1.90% |
| 1866 | 550 | −0.22% |
| 1872 | 505 | −1.41% |
| 1876 | 507 | +0.10% |
| 1881 | 506 | −0.04% |
| 1886 | 487 | −0.76% |
| 1891 | 500 | +0.53% |
| 1896 | 587 | +3.26% |

| Year | Pop. | ±% p.a. |
|---|---|---|
| 1901 | 586 | −0.03% |
| 1906 | 633 | +1.55% |
| 1911 | 651 | +0.56% |
| 1921 | 772 | +1.72% |
| 1926 | 931 | +3.82% |
| 1931 | 1,124 | +3.84% |
| 1936 | 1,090 | −0.61% |
| 1946 | 1,214 | +1.08% |
| 1954 | 1,345 | +1.29% |
| 1962 | 1,671 | +2.75% |
| 1968 | 1,707 | +0.36% |
| 1975 | 2,188 | +3.61% |
| 1982 | 2,632 | +2.67% |
| 1990 | 3,879 | +4.97% |
| 1999 | 3,819 | −0.17% |
| 2006 | 4,325 | +1.79% |
| 2022 | 4,670 | +0.48% |

Source: EHESS and INSEE

== See also ==
- Communes of the Eure department
