= Sainte-Barbe-sur-Gaillon =

- Part of Le Val-d'Hazey
- Coat of arms
- Location of Sainte-Barbe-sur-Gaillon
- Location within France Location within Normandy
- Coordinates: 49°10′02″N 1°19′14″E
- Country: France
- Region: Normandy
- Department: Eure
- Arrondissement: Les Andelys
- Canton: Gaillon
- Commune: Le Val-d'Hazey
- Area^{1}: 4.18 km^{2} (1.61 sq mi)
- Elevation: 135 m (443 ft)
- Highest elevation: 146 m (479 ft)
- Lowest elevation: 45 m (148 ft)
- Population (2023): 301
  - Density: 72.0/km^{2} (187/sq mi)
- Time zone: UTC+01:00 (CET)
  - Summer (DST): UTC+02:00 (CEST)
- Postal code: 27600
- ^{1} French Land Register data, which excludes lakes, ponds, glaciers > 1 km^{2} (0.386 sq mi or 247 acres) and river estuaries.

Sainte-Barbe-sur-Gaillon (French pronunciation: [sɛ̃t baʁb syʁ ɡajɔ̃], literally Sainte-Barbe on Gaillon) is a former commune in the Eure department and Normandy region of France. On 1 January 2016, it was merged into the new commune of Le Val-d'Hazey.

== See also ==
- Communes of the Eure department
