= Combatant's Cross =

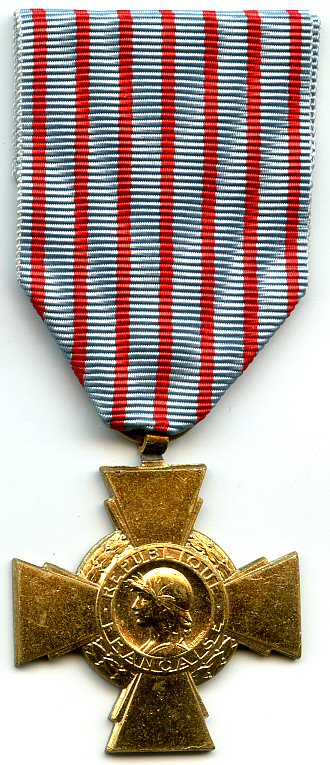
- Obverse of the Combatant's Cross
- Awarded for: Combat service to France
- Presented by: France
- Established: 19 December 1926
- Ribbon of the Combatant's Cross

Precedence
- Next (higher): Aeronautical Medal
- Next (lower): Medal of French Gratitude

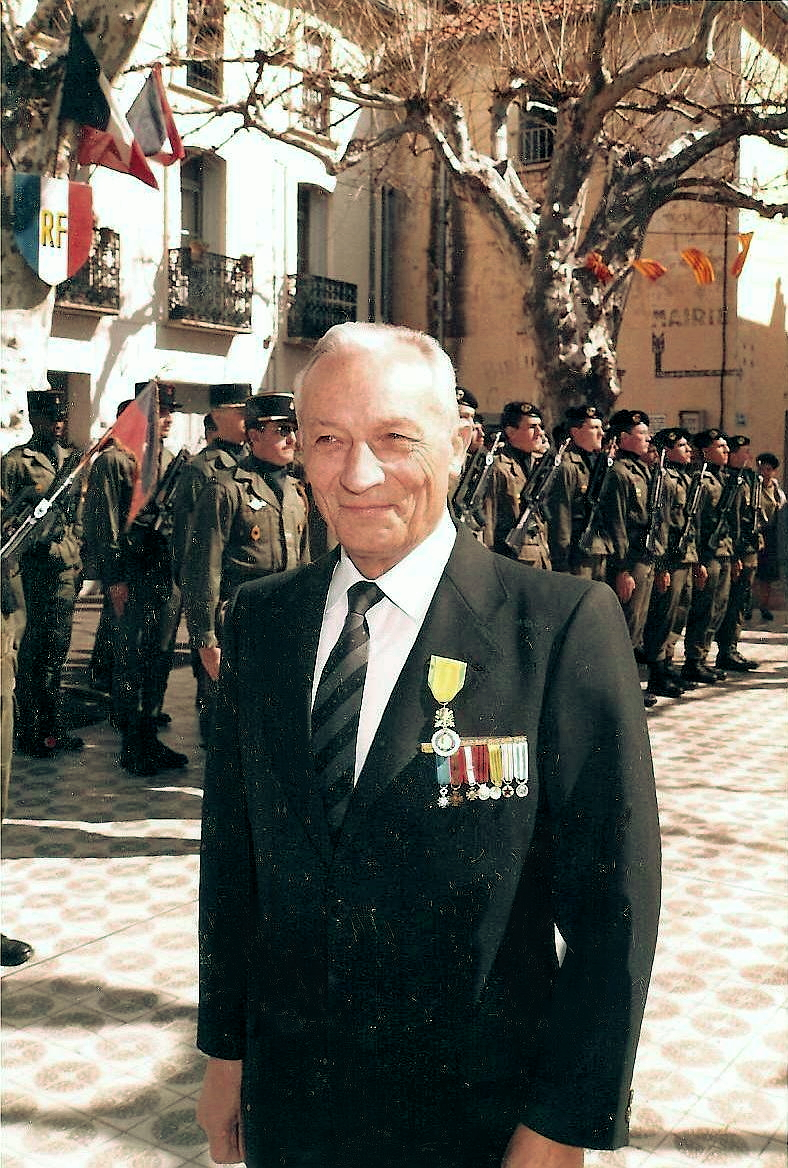
André Daugnac, a recipient of the Combatant's Cross

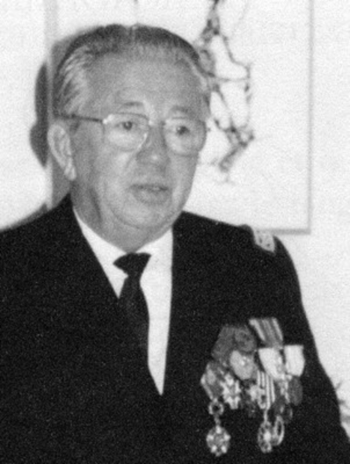
Doctor Edmond Reboul, a recipient of the Combatant's Cross

The Combatant's Cross (French: "Croix du combattant") is a French decoration that recognizes, as its name implies, those who fought in combat for France. The Poilus (French combat soldiers) of World War I worked toward recognition by the government, of a special status to those who had participated in the bitter fighting of 1914–1918 (as opposed to those who served behind the lines). The law of 19 December 1926 created la "carte du combatant", or combatant's card, for veterans of 1914–1918, as well as for the veterans of the Franco-Prussian War (1870–1871) and colonial wars before the First World War. The decoration was created only three years later by the law of 28 June 1930.

A decree of January 29, 1948 states that the provisions of the 1930 Act relating to the allocation of the combatant's card and the Combatant's Cross were applicable to participants of the 1939–1945 war. The law of 18 July 1952 extended the benefit of the award of the Croix du combattant for Indochina and Korea.

The law of December 9, 1974 extended the award of the Combatant's Cross to operations in North Africa between 1 January 1952 and July 2, 1962. More recently, a decree of January 12, 1994 opened le carte du combattant holder (hence of the Combatant's Cross) to those who participated in operations in Cambodia, Cameroon, Persian Gulf, Lebanon, Madagascar, the Suez Canal, Somalia, Central African Republic, Chad, Yugoslavia, Zaire and Iraq.

== Award statute ==
There is a particular set of requirements for each conflict or military operation in regards to the granting of the combatant card.

The Cross is awarded in different cases:

- for service with a unit asserted as combattant unit (front-line service) by the Ministry of Defense : ninety days of service or a wound or illness received or contracted during service, or ninety days of detention by the enemy.
- for service with any unit : mention in dispatches for valor, or direct participation in five fire engagements, or a wound in action, or detention by the enemy without application of the Geneva Convention

== Award description ==
A 36 mm wide bronze cross pattée with a laurel wreath between the arms 36 mm across.

On the obverse at center, the effigy of the Republic wearing an Adrian's helmet crowned with laurel leaves surrounded by the relief inscription REPUBLIQUE FRANCAISE (FRENCH REPUBLIC).

On the reverse the relief inscription CROIX DU COMBATTANT (COMBATANT'S CROSS) along the lower circumference framing a vertical sword pointing down, rays protruding horizontally and up from the hilt in a 180° arc.

== Noteworthy recipients (partial list) ==
- Resistance fighter André Girard
- General Jeannou Lacaze
- General Marcel Letestu
- General Pierre Garbay
- General Antoine Béthouart
- Brigadier General Charles de Gaulle
- Private René Riffaud
- Private Ramire Rosan
- Military interpreter Robert Merle
- Private Léon Weil
- Resistance fighter René-Georges Laurin
- Commander Philippe Kieffer
- Squadron leader René Mouchotte
- Sergeant Eugene Bullard
- Sergeant Dominique Venner
- Henri d'Orléans, Count of Paris

== See also ==
- Ribbons of the French military and civil awards
