= Vieux-Villez =

- Part of Le Val-d'Hazey
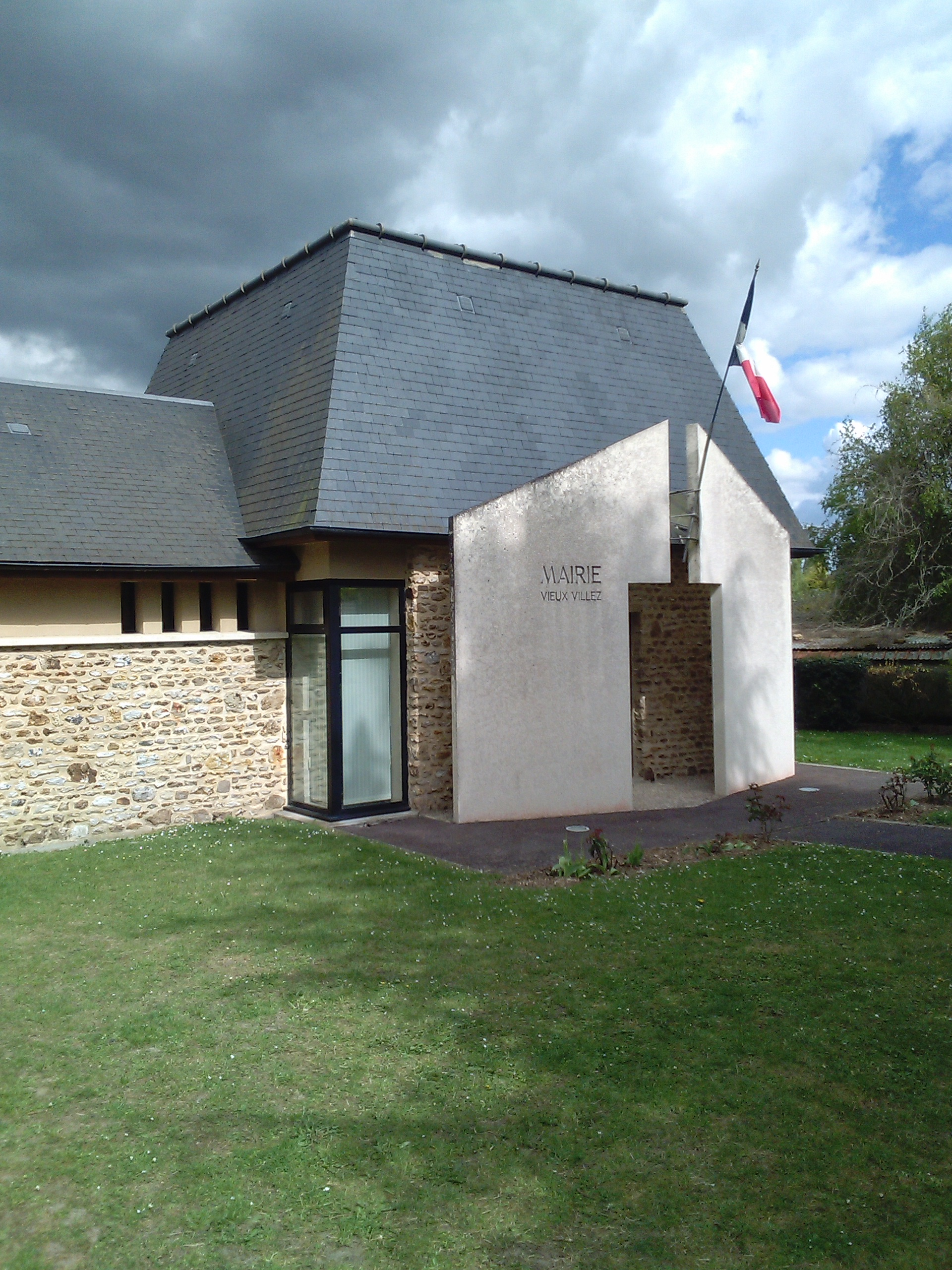
- Town hall
- Location of Vieux-Villez
- Location within France Location within Normandy
- Coordinates: 49°10′21″N 1°17′19″E
- Country: France
- Region: Normandy
- Department: Eure
- Arrondissement: Les Andelys
- Canton: Gaillon
- Commune: Le Val-d'Hazey
- Area^{1}: 2.56 km^{2} (0.99 sq mi)
- Elevation: 140 m (460 ft)
- Highest elevation: 146 m (479 ft)
- Lowest elevation: 73 m (240 ft)
- Population (2023): 180
  - Density: 70/km^{2} (180/sq mi)
- Time zone: UTC+01:00 (CET)
  - Summer (DST): UTC+02:00 (CEST)
- Postal code: 27600
- ^{1} French Land Register data, which excludes lakes, ponds, glaciers > 1 km^{2} (0.386 sq mi or 247 acres) and river estuaries.

Vieux-Villez (French pronunciation: [vjø vile]) is a former commune in the Eure department in Normandy in northern France. On 1 January 2016, it was merged into the new commune of Le Val-d'Hazey.

== See also ==
- Communes of the Eure department
