= La Croix-Saint-Leufroy =

- Part of Clef-Vallée-d'Eure
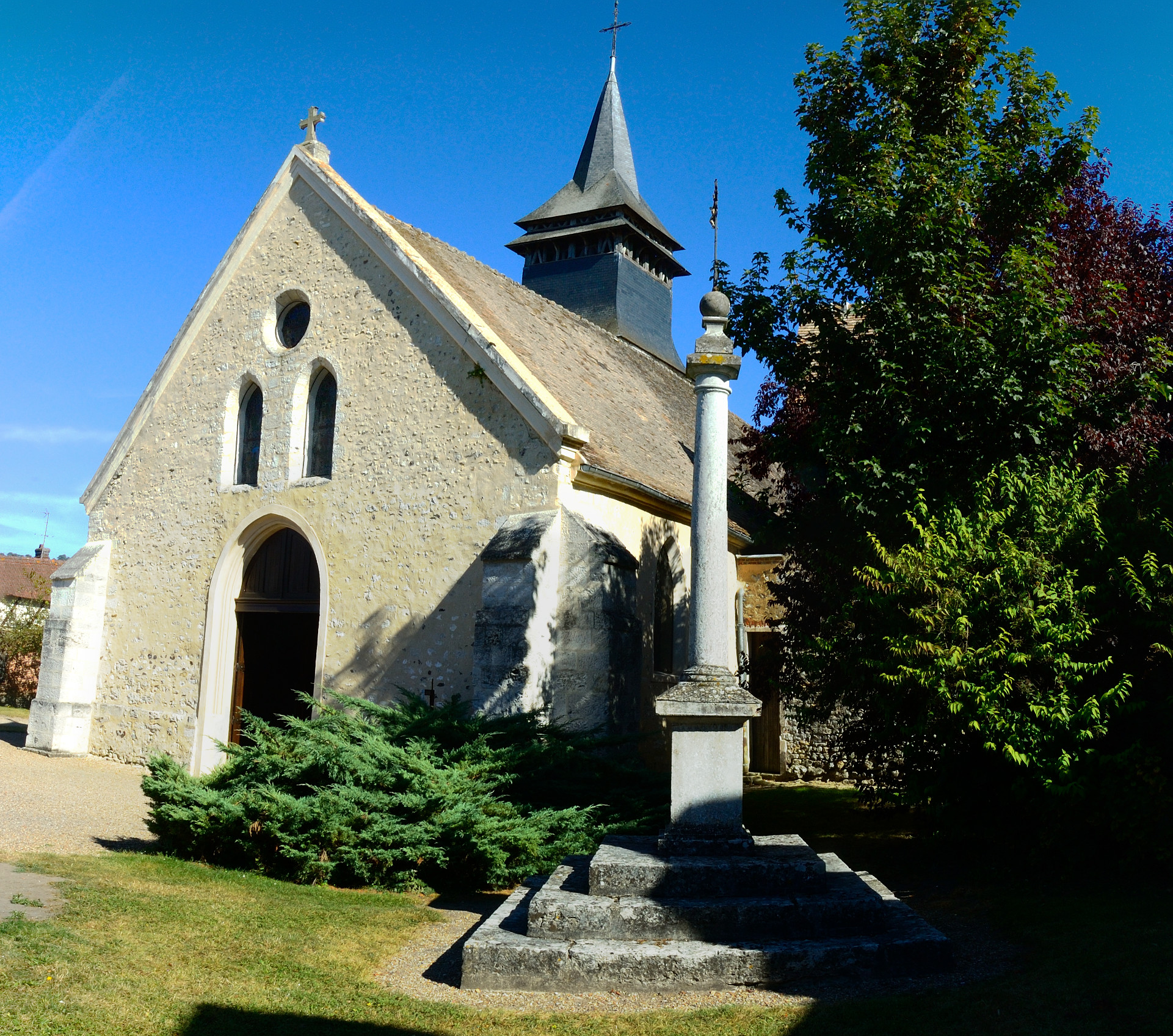

- Coat of arms
- Location of La Croix-Saint-Leufroy
- Location within France Location within Normandy
- Coordinates: 49°06′36″N 1°14′39″E
- Country: France
- Region: Normandy
- Department: Eure
- Arrondissement: Les Andelys
- Canton: Gaillon
- Commune: Clef-Vallée-d'Eure
- Area^{1}: 14.87 km^{2} (5.74 sq mi)
- Elevation: 24 m (79 ft)
- Highest elevation: 157 m (515 ft)
- Lowest elevation: 22 m (72 ft)
- Population (2019): 1,101
  - Density: 74.04/km^{2} (191.8/sq mi)
- Time zone: UTC+01:00 (CET)
  - Summer (DST): UTC+02:00 (CEST)
- Postal code: 27490
- ^{1} French Land Register data, which excludes lakes, ponds, glaciers > 1 km^{2} (0.386 sq mi or 247 acres) and river estuaries.

La Croix-Saint-Leufroy (French pronunciation: [la kʁwa sɛ̃ lœfʁwa]) is a former commune in the Eure department in northern France. On 1 January 2016, it was merged into the new commune of Clef-Vallée-d'Eure.

== Population ==
Historical population
Year	Pop.	±% p.a.
1962	665	—
1968	667	+0.05%
1975	683	+0.34%
1982	732	+0.99%
1990	723	−0.15%
1999	931	+2.85%
2006	1,035	+1.52%
2019	1,101	+0.48%
Source: EHESS and INSEE

== See also ==
- Communes of the Eure department
