= Tosny =

- Part of Les Trois Lacs
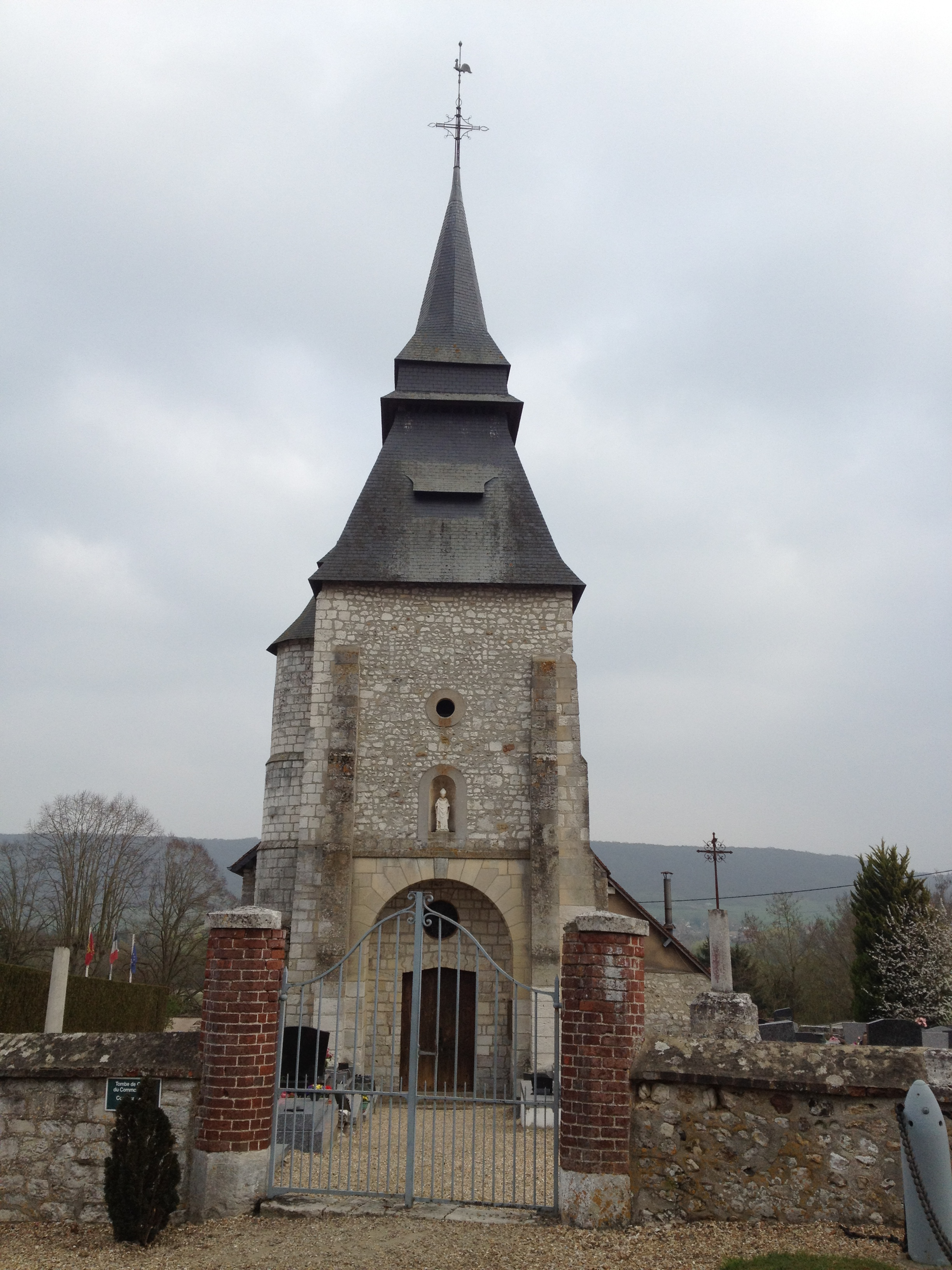
- Location of Tosny
- Location within France Location within Normandy
- Coordinates: 49°13′07″N 1°22′25″E
- Country: France
- Region: Normandy
- Department: Eure
- Arrondissement: Les Andelys
- Canton: Gaillon
- Commune: Les Trois Lacs
- Area^{1}: 15.02 km^{2} (5.80 sq mi)
- Elevation: 32 m (105 ft)
- Highest elevation: 78 m (256 ft)
- Lowest elevation: 7 m (23 ft)
- Population (2018): 627
  - Density: 41.7/km^{2} (108/sq mi)
- Time zone: UTC+01:00 (CET)
  - Summer (DST): UTC+02:00 (CEST)
- Postal code: 27700
- ^{1} French Land Register data, which excludes lakes, ponds, glaciers > 1 km^{2} (0.386 sq mi or 247 acres) and river estuaries.

Tosny (French pronunciation: [toni]) is a former commune in the Eure department in Normandy in northern France, some ten miles south of Rouen. On 1 January 2017, it was merged into the new commune Les Trois Lacs.

== Population ==
Historical population
Year	Pop.	±% p.a.
1962	233	—
1968	303	+4.48%
1975	362	+2.57%
1982	362	+0.00%
1990	446	+2.64%
1999	569	+2.74%
2006	608	+0.95%
2018	627	+0.26%
Source: EHESS and INSEE

== Personalities ==
- René Riffaud

== See also ==
- Communes of the Eure department
