= Le Val-d'Hazey =

- Commune
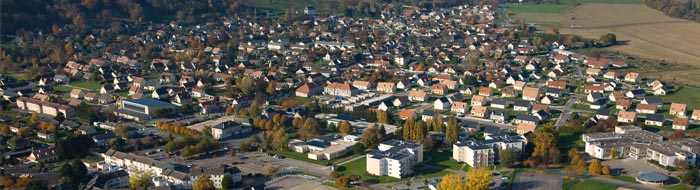
- An aerial view of Aubevoye
- Location of Le Val-d'Hazey
- Location within France Location within Normandy
- Coordinates: 49°10′26″N 1°20′10″E
- Country: France
- Region: Normandy
- Department: Eure
- Arrondissement: Les Andelys
- Canton: Gaillon
- Intercommunality: CA Seine-Eure

Government
  - Mayor (2020–2026): Philippe Collas
- Area^{1}: 14.37 km^{2} (5.55 sq mi)
- Population (2023): 5,111
  - Density: 355.7/km^{2} (921.2/sq mi)
- Time zone: UTC+01:00 (CET)
  - Summer (DST): UTC+02:00 (CEST)
- INSEE/Postal code: 27022 /27940, 27600
- ^{1} French Land Register data, which excludes lakes, ponds, glaciers > 1 km^{2} (0.386 sq mi or 247 acres) and river estuaries.

Le Val-d'Hazey (French pronunciation: [lə val dazɛ]) is a commune in the department of Eure, northern France. The municipality was established on 1 January 2016 by merger of the former communes of Aubevoye, Sainte-Barbe-sur-Gaillon and Vieux-Villez.

== Population ==
Population data refer to the commune in its geography as of January 2025.

Historical population
Year	Pop.	±% p.a.
1968	2,062	—
1975	2,505	+2.82%
1982	2,956	+2.39%
1990	4,231	+4.58%
1999	4,209	−0.06%
2007	4,853	+1.80%
2012	5,474	+2.44%
2017	5,556	+0.30%
2023	5,111	−1.38%
Source: INSEE

== See also ==
- Communes of the Eure department
