= Ramire Rosan =

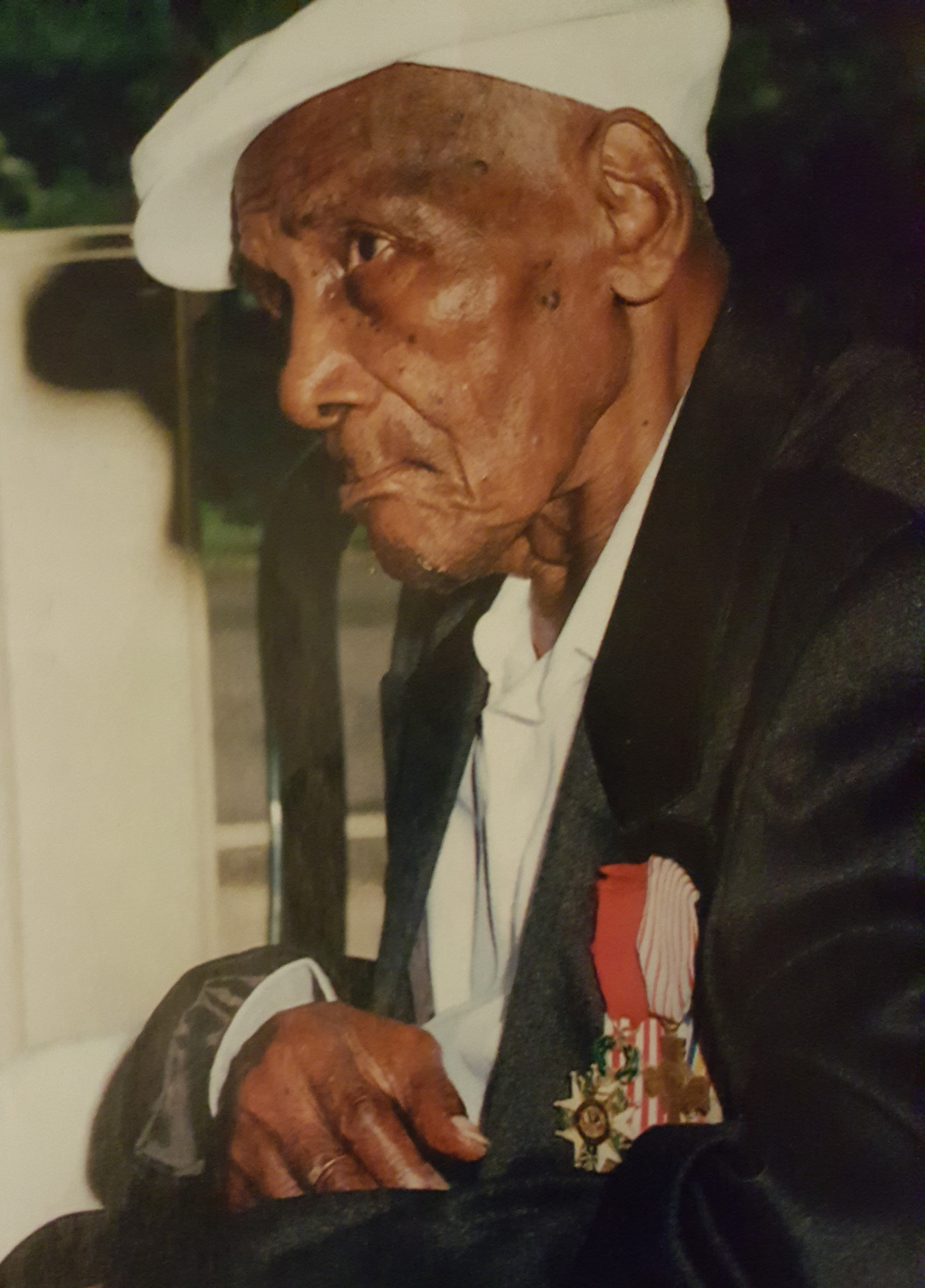
- Ramire Rosan was appointed Chevalier de la Légion d'honneur in 1996
- Born: April 14, 1895; Morne-à-l'Eau, Guadeloupe
- Died: May 24, 2004 (aged 109); Guadeloupe
- Military career
- Allegiance: France
- Branch: French Army
- Unit: 23rd Colonial Infantry Regiment
- Conflicts: World War I
- Awards: Legion of Honour (1996) • Combatant's Cross • 1914–1918 Commemorative War Medal • 1914–1918 Inter-Allied Victory Medal
- Other work: Sugar cane farmer

Ramire Rosan (14 April 1895 – 24 May 2004) was the last World War I veteran from the overseas departments and territories of France. Grandson of a slave, he was born in Morne-à-l'Eau, Guadeloupe, where he cultivated sugar cane. Mounted gendarmes came to pick him up and sent him immediately to a base, he was enlisted to the twenty-third regiment of the colonial infantry. In July 1916 he took part in the Battle of the Somme, where he was gassed.

He received four medals, including, in 1996, the Légion d'honneur.

He died in Guadeloupe in 2004, aged 109.

== Distinctions ==
- Legion of Honour (1996)
- Combatant's Cross
- 1914–1918 Commemorative war medal (France)
- 1914–1918 Inter-Allied Victory medal
