= Fontaine-Heudebourg =

- Part of Clef-Vallée-d'Eure
- Location of Fontaine-Heudebourg
- Location within France Location within Normandy
- Coordinates: 49°07′48″N 1°12′47″E
- Country: France
- Region: Normandy
- Department: Eure
- Arrondissement: Les Andelys
- Canton: Gaillon
- Commune: Clef-Vallée-d'Eure
- Area^{1}: 4.05 km^{2} (1.56 sq mi)
- Elevation: 25 m (82 ft)
- Highest elevation: 138 m (453 ft)
- Lowest elevation: 22 m (72 ft)
- Population (2019): 820
  - Density: 200/km^{2} (520/sq mi)
- Time zone: UTC+01:00 (CET)
  - Summer (DST): UTC+02:00 (CEST)
- Postal code: 27490
- ^{1} French Land Register data, which excludes lakes, ponds, glaciers > 1 km^{2} (0.386 sq mi or 247 acres) and river estuaries.

Fontaine-Heudebourg (French pronunciation: [fɔ̃tɛn ødbuʁ]) is a former commune in the Eure department in the Normandy region in northern France. On 1 January 2016, it was merged into the new commune of Clef-Vallée-d'Eure.

== Population ==
Historical population
Year	Pop.	±% p.a.
1962	235	—
1968	254	+1.30%
1975	278	+1.30%
1982	554	+10.35%
1990	640	+1.82%
1999	642	+0.03%
2006	615	−0.61%
2019	820	+2.24%
Source: EHESS and INSEE

== See also ==
- Communes of the Eure department
