= Ailly, Eure =

Ailly
- Commune
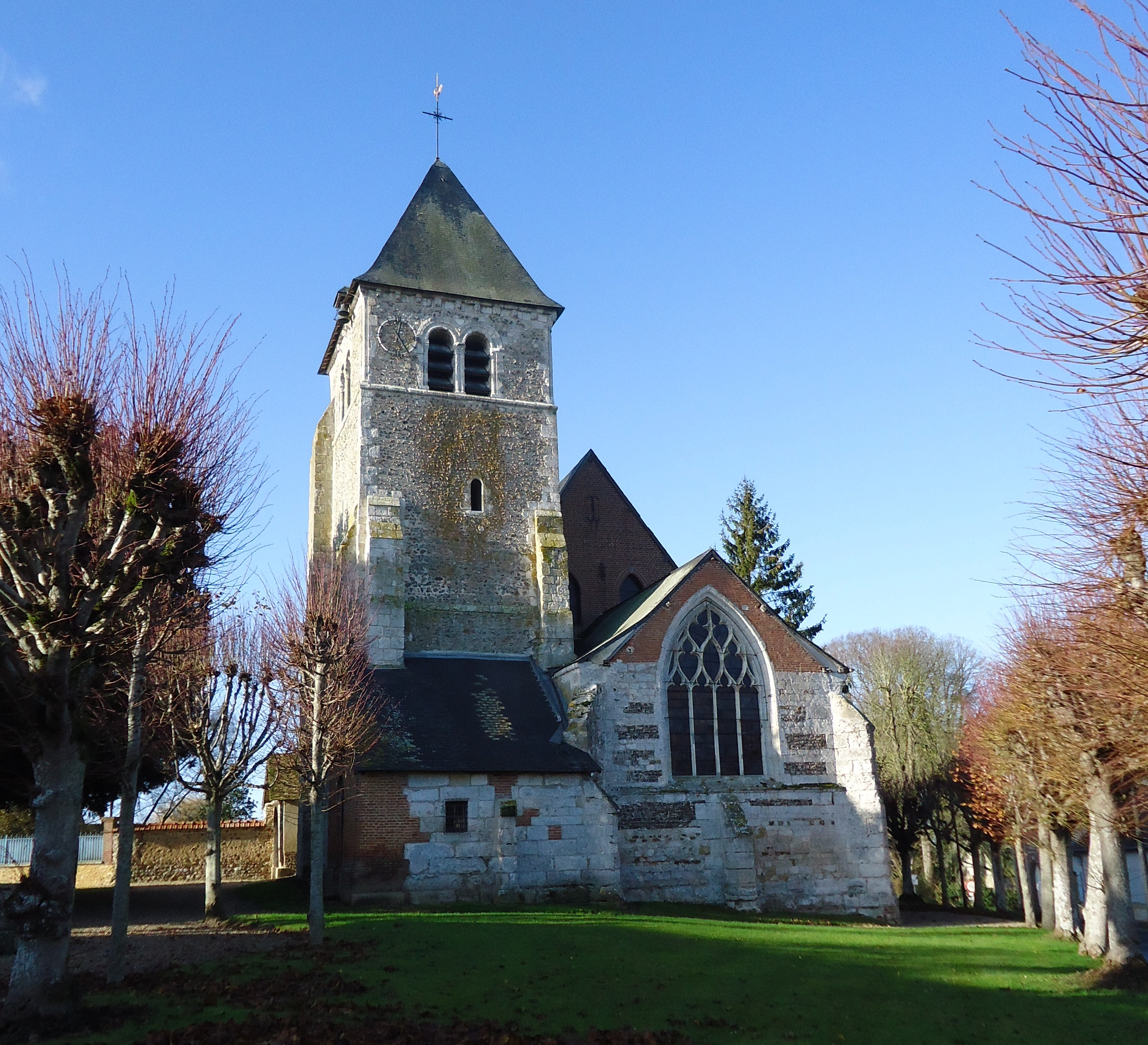
- The church in Ailly

- Coat of arms
- Location of Ailly
- Location within France Location within Normandy
- Coordinates: 49°09′42″N 1°14′51″E
- Country: France
- Region: Normandy
- Department: Eure
- Arrondissement: Les Andelys
- Canton: Gaillon
- Intercommunality: CA Seine-Eure

Government
  - Mayor (2020–2026): Frédéric Allot
- Area^{1}: 15.55 km^{2} (6.00 sq mi)
- Elevation: 156 m (512 ft)
- Highest elevation: 157 m (515 ft)
- Lowest elevation: 70 m (230 ft)
- Population (2023): 1,234
  - Density: 79.36/km^{2} (205.5/sq mi)
- Time zone: UTC+01:00 (CET)
  - Summer (DST): UTC+02:00 (CEST)
- INSEE/Postal code: 27005 /27600
- ^{1} French Land Register data, which excludes lakes, ponds, glaciers > 1 km^{2} (0.386 sq mi or 247 acres) and river estuaries.

Ailly (French pronunciation: [aji]) is a commune in the Eure department in Normandy in north-western France.

== Population ==
Historical population
Year	Pop.	±% p.a.
1968	417	—
1975	465	+1.57%
1982	604	+3.81%
1990	755	+2.83%
1999	775	+0.29%
2007	1,040	+3.74%
2012	1,143	+1.91%
2017	1,159	+0.28%
2023	1,234	+1.05%
Source: INSEE

== See also ==
- Communes of the Eure department
