= Champenard =

- Commune
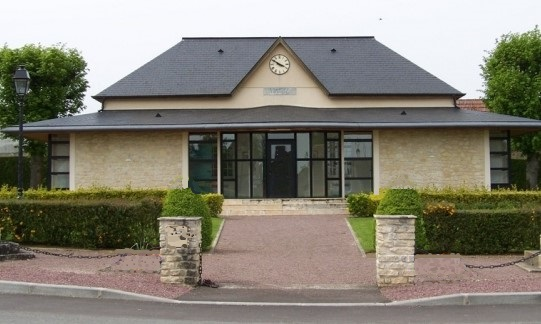
- The town hall in Champenard
- Location of Champenard
- Location within France Location within Normandy
- Coordinates: 49°06′25″N 1°20′04″E
- Country: France
- Region: Normandy
- Department: Eure
- Arrondissement: Les Andelys
- Canton: Gaillon
- Intercommunality: CA Seine-Eure

Government
  - Mayor (2020–2026): David Pollet
- Area^{1}: 2.32 km^{2} (0.90 sq mi)
- Elevation: 133 m (436 ft)
- Highest elevation: 136 m (446 ft)
- Lowest elevation: 110 m (360 ft)
- Population (2023): 294
  - Density: 127/km^{2} (328/sq mi)
- Time zone: UTC+01:00 (CET)
  - Summer (DST): UTC+02:00 (CEST)
- INSEE/Postal code: 27142 /27600
- ^{1} French Land Register data, which excludes lakes, ponds, glaciers > 1 km^{2} (0.386 sq mi or 247 acres) and river estuaries.

Champenard (French pronunciation: [ʃɑ̃pnaʁ]) is a commune in the Eure department and Normandy region of northern France.

== Population ==
Historical population
Year	Pop.	±% p.a.
1968	102	—
1975	108	+0.82%
1982	107	−0.13%
1990	129	+2.36%
1999	140	+0.91%
2007	184	+3.48%
2012	229	+4.47%
2017	270	+3.35%
2023	294	+1.43%
Source: INSEE

== See also ==
- Communes of the Eure department
