= Fontaine-Bellenger =

- Commune
- Coat of arms
- Location of Fontaine-Bellenger
- Location within France Location within Normandy
- Coordinates: 49°11′11″N 1°15′43″E
- Country: France
- Region: Normandy
- Department: Eure
- Arrondissement: Les Andelys
- Canton: Gaillon
- Intercommunality: CA Seine-Eure

Government
  - Mayor (2020–2026): Jean-Claude Duplouis
- Area^{1}: 4.96 km^{2} (1.92 sq mi)
- Elevation: 155 m (509 ft)
- Highest elevation: 151 m (495 ft)
- Lowest elevation: 88 m (289 ft)
- Population (2023): 1,056
  - Density: 213/km^{2} (551/sq mi)
- Time zone: UTC+01:00 (CET)
  - Summer (DST): UTC+02:00 (CEST)
- INSEE/Postal code: 27249 /27600
- ^{1} French Land Register data, which excludes lakes, ponds, glaciers > 1 km^{2} (0.386 sq mi or 247 acres) and river estuaries.

Fontaine-Bellenger (French pronunciation: [fɔ̃tɛn bɛlɑ̃ʒe]) is a commune in the Eure department in the Normandy region in northern France.

== Population ==
Historical population
Year	Pop.	±% p.a.
1968	263	—
1975	265	+0.11%
1982	559	+11.25%
1990	712	+3.07%
1999	812	+1.47%
2007	964	+2.17%
2012	1,061	+1.94%
2017	1,150	+1.62%
2023	1,056	−1.41%
Source: INSEE

== See also ==
- Communes of the Eure department
