= Saint-Julien-de-la-Liègue =

- Commune
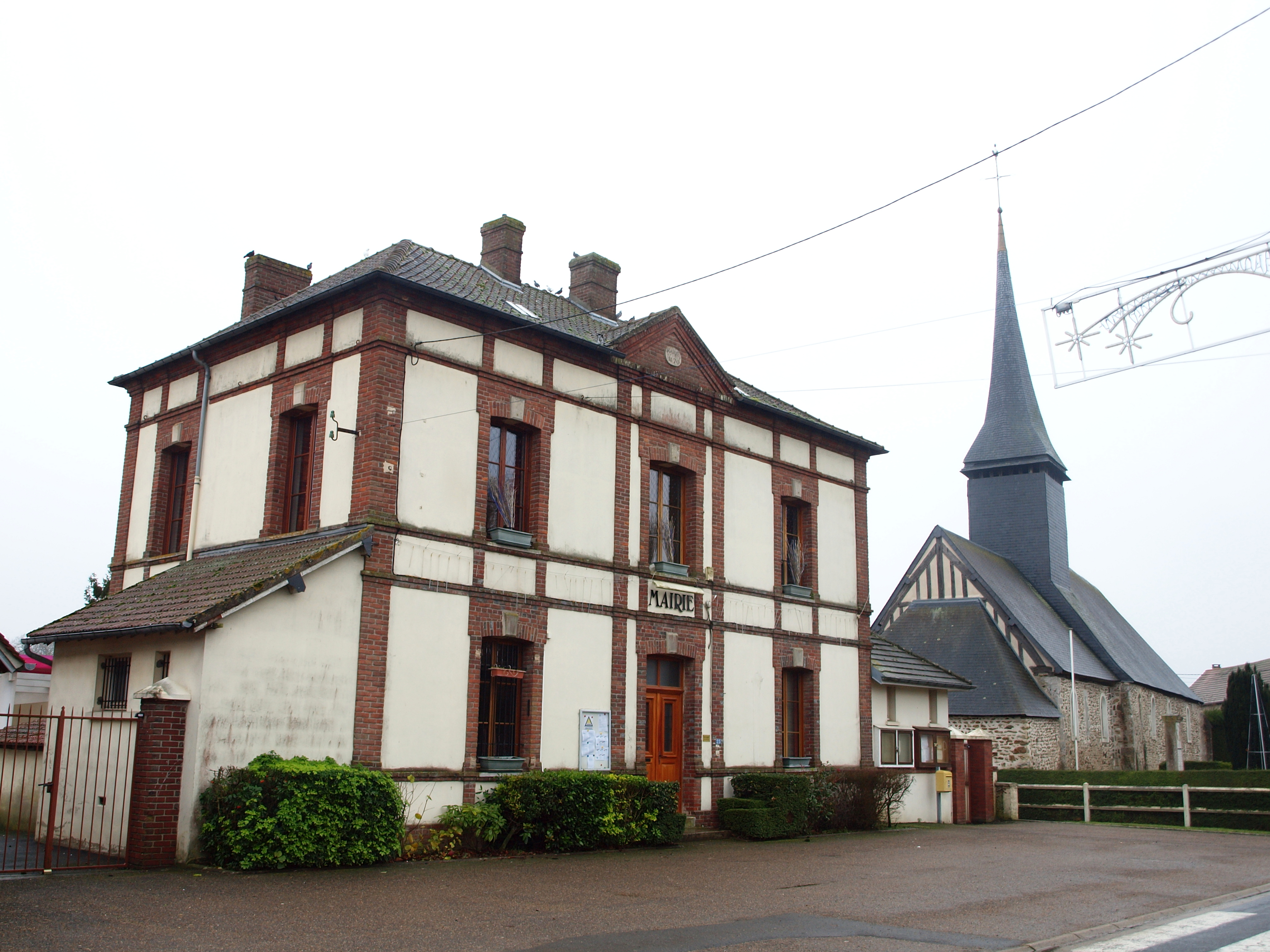
- The town hall and church in Saint-Julien-de-la-Liègue
- Location of Saint-Julien-de-la-Liègue
- Location within France Location within Normandy
- Coordinates: 49°08′18″N 1°17′42″E
- Country: France
- Region: Normandy
- Department: Eure
- Arrondissement: Les Andelys
- Canton: Gaillon
- Intercommunality: CA Seine-Eure

Government
  - Mayor (2020–2026): Alain Thierry
- Area^{1}: 4.67 km^{2} (1.80 sq mi)
- Elevation: 139 m (456 ft)
- Highest elevation: 156 m (512 ft)
- Lowest elevation: 94 m (308 ft)
- Population (2023): 421
  - Density: 90.1/km^{2} (233/sq mi)
- Time zone: UTC+01:00 (CET)
  - Summer (DST): UTC+02:00 (CEST)
- INSEE/Postal code: 27553 /27600
- ^{1} French Land Register data, which excludes lakes, ponds, glaciers > 1 km^{2} (0.386 sq mi or 247 acres) and river estuaries.

Saint-Julien-de-la-Liègue (French pronunciation: [sɛ̃ ʒyljɛ̃ də la ljɛɡ]) is a commune in the Eure department in Normandy in northern France.

== Population ==
Historical population
Year	Pop.	±% p.a.
1968	108	—
1975	136	+3.35%
1982	168	+3.06%
1990	236	+4.34%
1999	242	+0.28%
2007	302	+2.81%
2012	416	+6.61%
2017	413	−0.14%
2023	421	+0.32%
Source: INSEE

== See also ==
- Communes of the Eure department
