= Cailly-sur-Eure =

- Commune
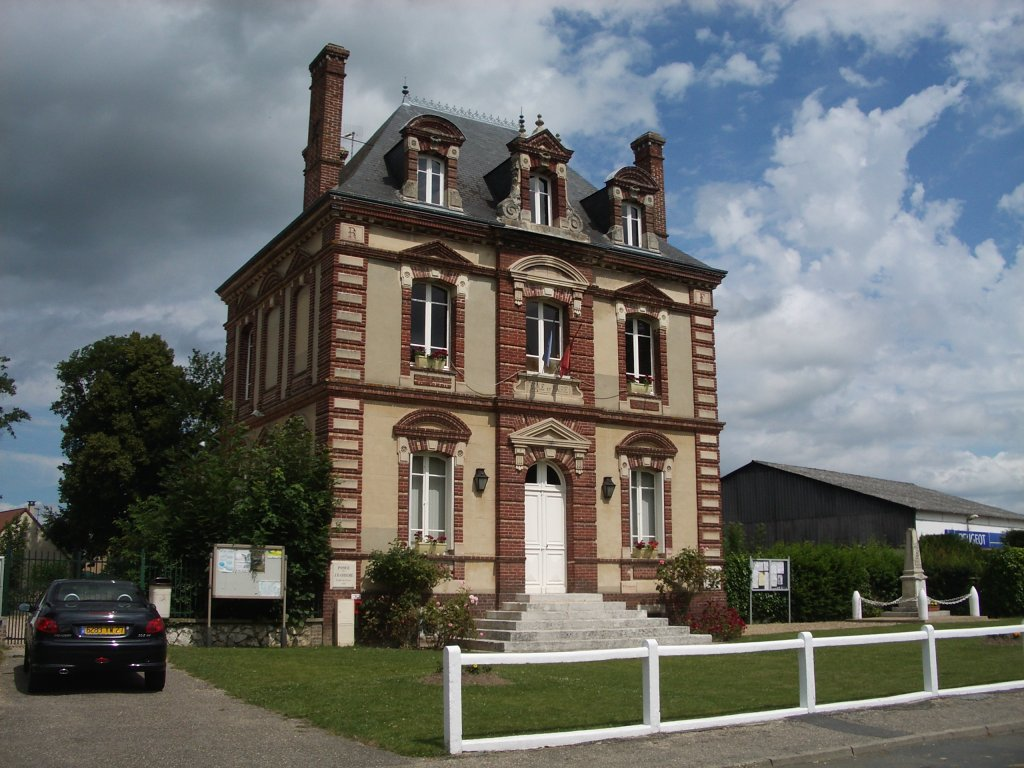
- Town hall

- Coat of arms
- Location of Cailly-sur-Eure
- Location within France Location within Normandy
- Coordinates: 49°07′01″N 1°12′48″E
- Country: France
- Region: Normandy
- Department: Eure
- Arrondissement: Les Andelys
- Canton: Gaillon
- Intercommunality: CA Seine-Eure

Government
  - Mayor (2020–2026): Éric Juhel
- Area^{1}: 3.33 km^{2} (1.29 sq mi)
- Elevation: 23 m (75 ft)
- Highest elevation: 134 m (440 ft)
- Lowest elevation: 21 m (69 ft)
- Population (2023): 228
  - Density: 68.5/km^{2} (177/sq mi)
- Time zone: UTC+01:00 (CET)
  - Summer (DST): UTC+02:00 (CEST)
- INSEE/Postal code: 27124 /27490
- ^{1} French Land Register data, which excludes lakes, ponds, glaciers > 1 km^{2} (0.386 sq mi or 247 acres) and river estuaries.

Cailly-sur-Eure (French pronunciation: [kaji syʁ œʁ], literally Cailly on Eure) is a commune in the Eure department and Normandy region of France.

== Population ==
Historical population
Year	Pop.	±% p.a.
1968	159	—
1975	178	+1.63%
1982	181	+0.24%
1990	191	+0.67%
1999	233	+2.23%
2007	238	+0.27%
2012	218	−1.74%
2017	219	+0.09%
2023	228	+0.67%
Source: INSEE

== See also ==
- Communes of the Eure department
