= Saint-Pierre-de-Bailleul =

- Commune
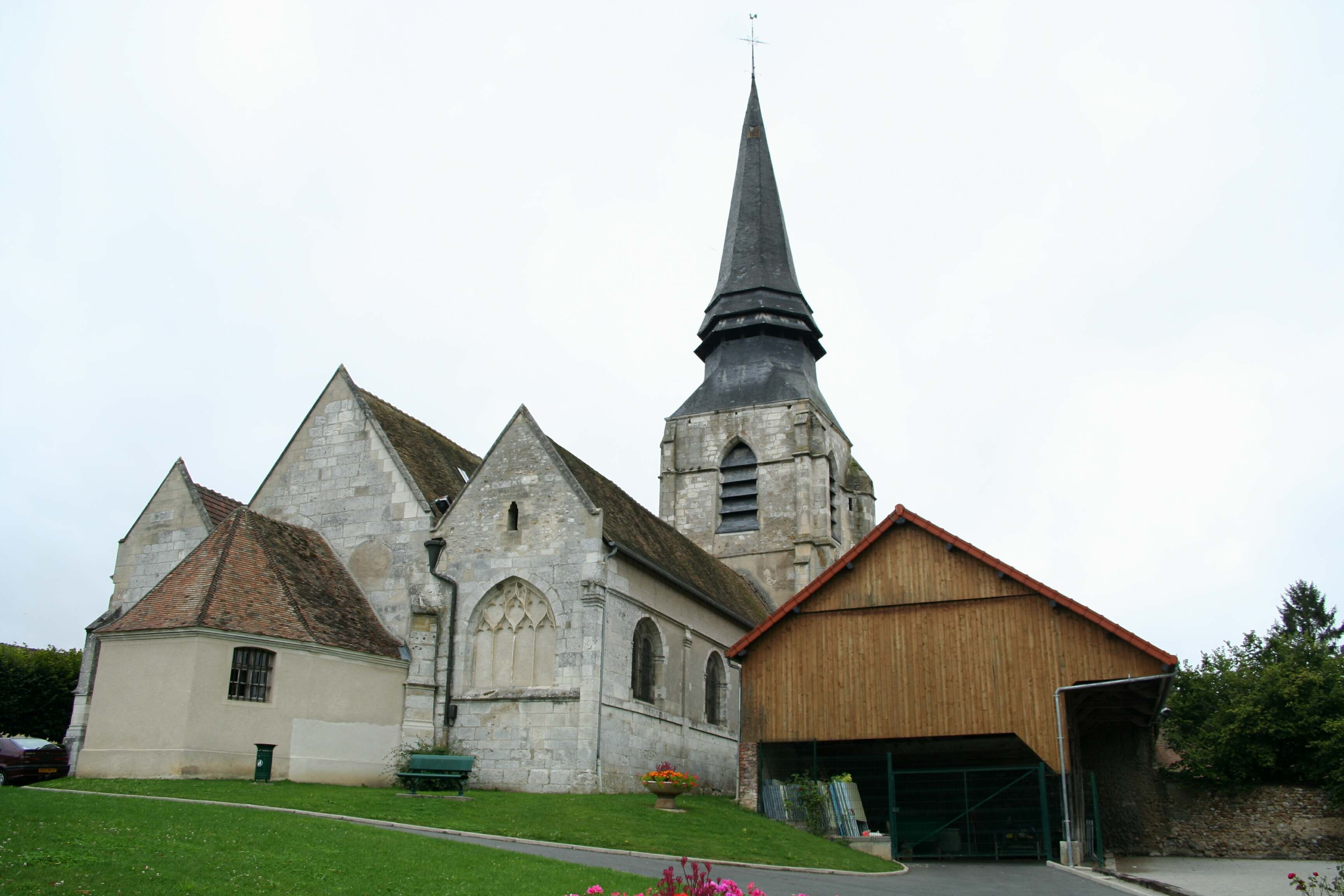
- The church in Saint-Pierre-de-Bailleul

- Coat of arms
- Location of Saint-Pierre-de-Bailleul
- Location within France Location within Normandy
- Coordinates: 49°07′25″N 1°23′25″E
- Country: France
- Region: Normandy
- Department: Eure
- Arrondissement: Les Andelys
- Canton: Gaillon
- Intercommunality: CA Seine-Eure

Government
  - Mayor (2020–2026): Pascal Jumel
- Area^{1}: 6.34 km^{2} (2.45 sq mi)
- Elevation: 123 m (404 ft)
- Highest elevation: 136 m (446 ft)
- Lowest elevation: 15 m (49 ft)
- Population (2023): 973
  - Density: 153/km^{2} (397/sq mi)
- Time zone: UTC+01:00 (CET)
  - Summer (DST): UTC+02:00 (CEST)
- INSEE/Postal code: 27589 /27920
- ^{1} French Land Register data, which excludes lakes, ponds, glaciers > 1 km^{2} (0.386 sq mi or 247 acres) and river estuaries.

Saint-Pierre-de-Bailleul (French pronunciation: [sɛ̃ pjɛʁ də bajœl]) is a commune in the Eure department in Normandy in northern France.

== Population ==
Historical population
Year	Pop.	±% p.a.
1968	531	—
1975	624	+2.33%
1982	655	+0.70%
1990	834	+3.07%
1999	935	+1.28%
2007	1,021	+1.11%
2012	1,004	−0.34%
2017	955	−1.00%
2023	973	+0.31%
Source: INSEE

== See also ==
- Communes of the Eure department
