= Autheuil-Authouillet =

- Commune
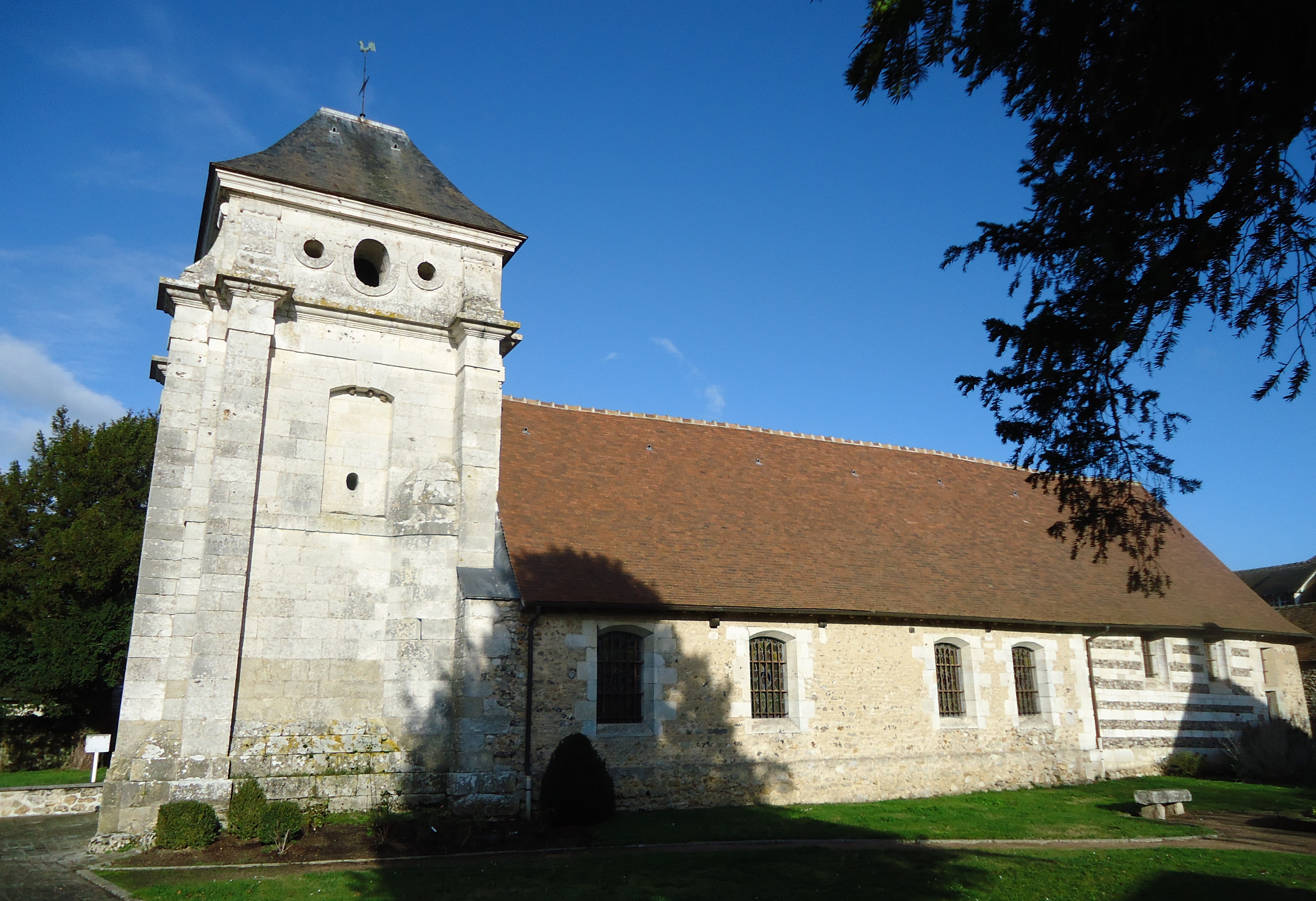
- The church in Autheuil-Authouillet
- Location of Autheuil-Authouillet
- Location within France Location within Normandy
- Coordinates: 49°05′51″N 1°16′51″E
- Country: France
- Region: Normandy
- Department: Eure
- Arrondissement: Les Andelys
- Canton: Gaillon
- Intercommunality: CA Seine-Eure

Government
  - Mayor (2020–2026): Denis Noël
- Area^{1}: 11.66 km^{2} (4.50 sq mi)
- Elevation: 30 m (98 ft)
- Highest elevation: 137 m (449 ft)
- Lowest elevation: 27 m (89 ft)
- Population (2023): 941
  - Density: 80.7/km^{2} (209/sq mi)
- Time zone: UTC+01:00 (CET)
  - Summer (DST): UTC+02:00 (CEST)
- INSEE/Postal code: 27025 /27490
- ^{1} French Land Register data, which excludes lakes, ponds, glaciers > 1 km^{2} (0.386 sq mi or 247 acres) and river estuaries.

Autheuil-Authouillet (French pronunciation: [otœj otujɛ]) is a commune in the Eure department in Normandy in northern France. It was the home of Simone Signoret and Yves Montand, after whom the village's main street, rue Yves Montand, and school, Ecole Simone Signoret, are named.

== Population ==
Historical population
Year	Pop.	±% p.a.
1968	597	—
1975	580	−0.41%
1982	683	+2.36%
1990	737	+0.96%
1999	765	+0.42%
2007	837	+1.13%
2012	922	+1.95%
2017	958	+0.77%
2023	941	−0.30%
Source: INSEE

== See also ==
- Communes of the Eure department
