= Heudreville-sur-Eure =

- Commune
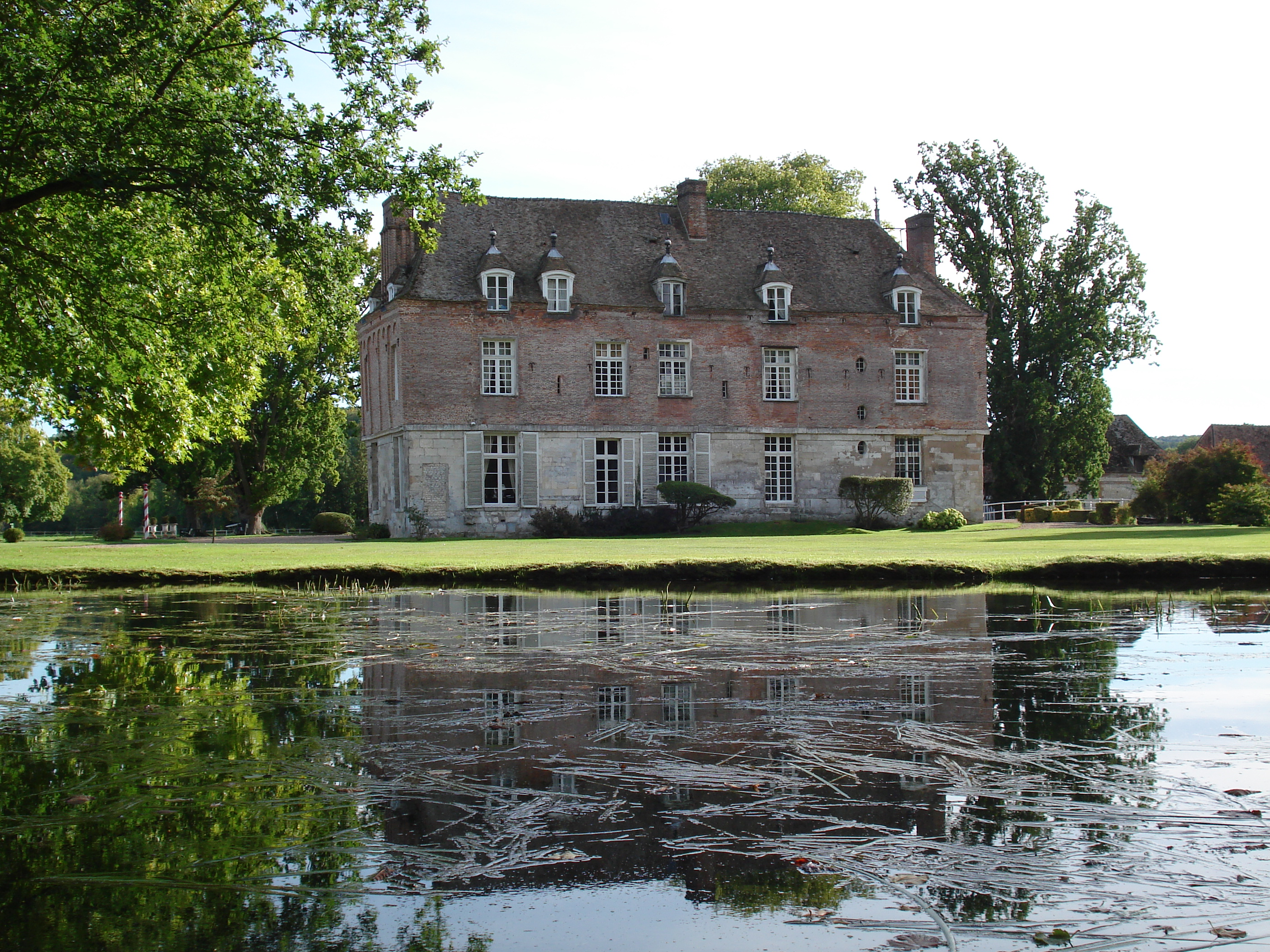
- Manor house

- Coat of arms
- Location of Heudreville-sur-Eure
- Location within France Location within Normandy
- Coordinates: 49°08′29″N 1°11′22″E
- Country: France
- Region: Normandy
- Department: Eure
- Arrondissement: Les Andelys
- Canton: Gaillon
- Intercommunality: CA Seine-Eure

Government
  - Mayor (2020–2026): Dominique Simon
- Area^{1}: 14.15 km^{2} (5.46 sq mi)
- Elevation: 25 m (82 ft)
- Highest elevation: 143 m (469 ft)
- Lowest elevation: 17 m (56 ft)
- Population (2023): 1,065
  - Density: 75.27/km^{2} (194.9/sq mi)
- Time zone: UTC+01:00 (CET)
  - Summer (DST): UTC+02:00 (CEST)
- INSEE/Postal code: 27335 /27400
- ^{1} French Land Register data, which excludes lakes, ponds, glaciers > 1 km^{2} (0.386 sq mi or 247 acres) and river estuaries.

Heudreville-sur-Eure (French pronunciation: [ødʁəvil syʁ œʁ], literally Heudreville on Eure) is a commune in the Eure department in northern France.

== Population ==
Historical population
| Year | Pop. | ±% p.a. |
|---|---|---|
| 1968 | 629 | — |
| 1975 | 653 | +0.54% |
| 1982 | 771 | +2.40% |
| 1990 | 918 | +2.21% |
| 1999 | 989 | +0.83% |
| 2007 | 1,020 | +0.39% |
| 2012 | 1,029 | +0.18% |
| 2017 | 1,052 | +0.44% |
| 2023 | 1,065 | +0.20% |
Source: INSEE

== See also ==
- Communes of the Eure department
