= Saint-Pierre-la-Garenne =

- Commune
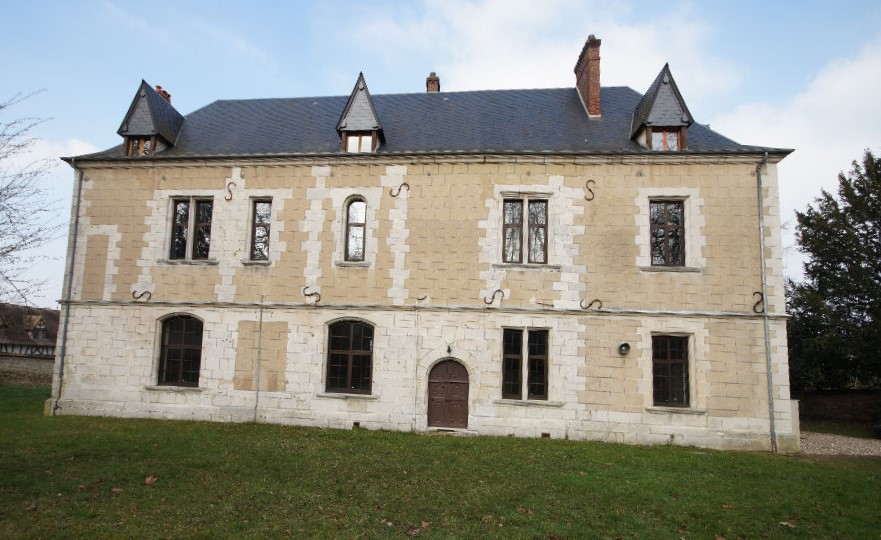
- The chateau de la Farguette

- Coat of arms
- Location of Saint-Pierre-la-Garenne
- Location within France Location within Normandy
- Coordinates: 49°08′43″N 1°23′47″E
- Country: France
- Region: Normandy
- Department: Eure
- Arrondissement: Les Andelys
- Canton: Gaillon
- Intercommunality: CA Seine-Eure

Government
  - Mayor (2020–2026): Liliane Bourgeois
- Area^{1}: 7.64 km^{2} (2.95 sq mi)
- Elevation: 25 m (82 ft)
- Highest elevation: 134 m (440 ft)
- Lowest elevation: 11 m (36 ft)
- Population (2023): 927
  - Density: 121/km^{2} (314/sq mi)
- Time zone: UTC+01:00 (CET)
  - Summer (DST): UTC+02:00 (CEST)
- INSEE/Postal code: 27599 /27600
- ^{1} French Land Register data, which excludes lakes, ponds, glaciers > 1 km^{2} (0.386 sq mi or 247 acres) and river estuaries.

Saint-Pierre-la-Garenne (French pronunciation: [sɛ̃ pjɛʁ la ɡaʁɛn]) is a commune in the Eure department in Normandy in northern France.

== Population ==
Historical population
Year	Pop.	±% p.a.
1968	734	—
1975	851	+2.14%
1982	814	−0.63%
1990	948	+1.92%
1999	875	−0.89%
2007	874	−0.01%
2012	949	+1.66%
2017	912	−0.79%
2023	927	+0.27%
Source: INSEE

== See also ==
- Communes of the Eure department
