= Écardenville-sur-Eure =

- Part of Clef-Vallée-d'Eure
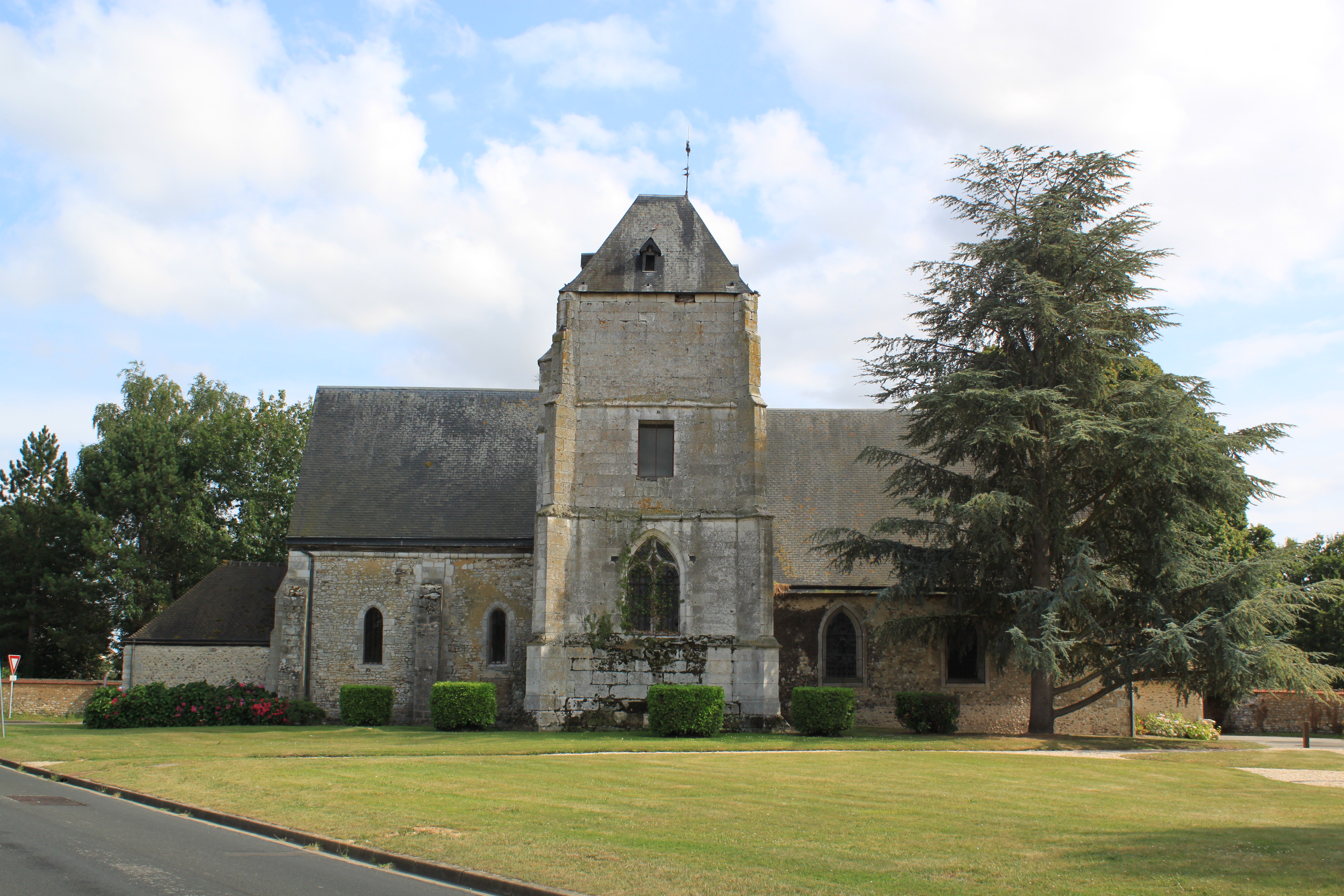
- St. Germanus' Church

- Coat of arms
- Location of Écardenville-sur-Eure
- Location within France Location within Normandy
- Coordinates: 49°06′09″N 1°15′53″E
- Country: France
- Region: Normandy
- Department: Eure
- Arrondissement: Les Andelys
- Canton: Gaillon
- Commune: Clef-Vallée-d'Eure
- Area^{1}: 6.67 km^{2} (2.58 sq mi)
- Elevation: 35 m (115 ft)
- Highest elevation: 145 m (476 ft)
- Lowest elevation: 26 m (85 ft)
- Population (2019): 579
  - Density: 86.8/km^{2} (225/sq mi)
- Time zone: UTC+01:00 (CET)
  - Summer (DST): UTC+02:00 (CEST)
- Postal code: 27490
- ^{1} French Land Register data, which excludes lakes, ponds, glaciers > 1 km^{2} (0.386 sq mi or 247 acres) and river estuaries.

Écardenville-sur-Eure (French pronunciation: [ekaʁdɑ̃vil syʁ œʁ], literally Écardenville on Eure) is a former commune in the Eure department in northern France. On 1 January 2016, it was merged into the new commune of Clef-Vallée-d'Eure.

== Population ==
Historical population
Year	Pop.	±% p.a.
1962	226	—
1968	253	+1.90%
1975	284	+1.66%
1982	399	+4.98%
1990	501	+2.89%
1999	544	+0.92%
2006	530	−0.37%
2019	579	+0.68%
Source: EHESS and INSEE

== See also ==
- Communes of the Eure department
