= René Riffaud =

René Félix Louis Joseph Riffaud (December 19, 1898 – January 16, 2007) was one of the last four 'official' French veterans of the First World War when he died at age 108 in Tosny, France.

Born in Jendouba, Tunisia, Riffaud was conscripted into the Army of Africa in April 1917 as a 2nd class soldier (Soldat de deuxième classe) and served in various regiments. He was discharged in 1919 after a bout of tuberculosis, but rejoined later that year, and served until 1924.

His wife, Lucie, whom he married in 1930, died in 1979. Their only son also pre-deceased him.

== Decorations ==
- Chevalier of the Legion of Honour
- Croix de Guerre 1914–1918
- Combatant's Cross
- 1914–1918 Commemorative war medal
- Medal of French Gratitude
- World War I Victory Medal

== See also ==
- Tirailleurs
