= Villers-sur-le-Roule =

- Commune
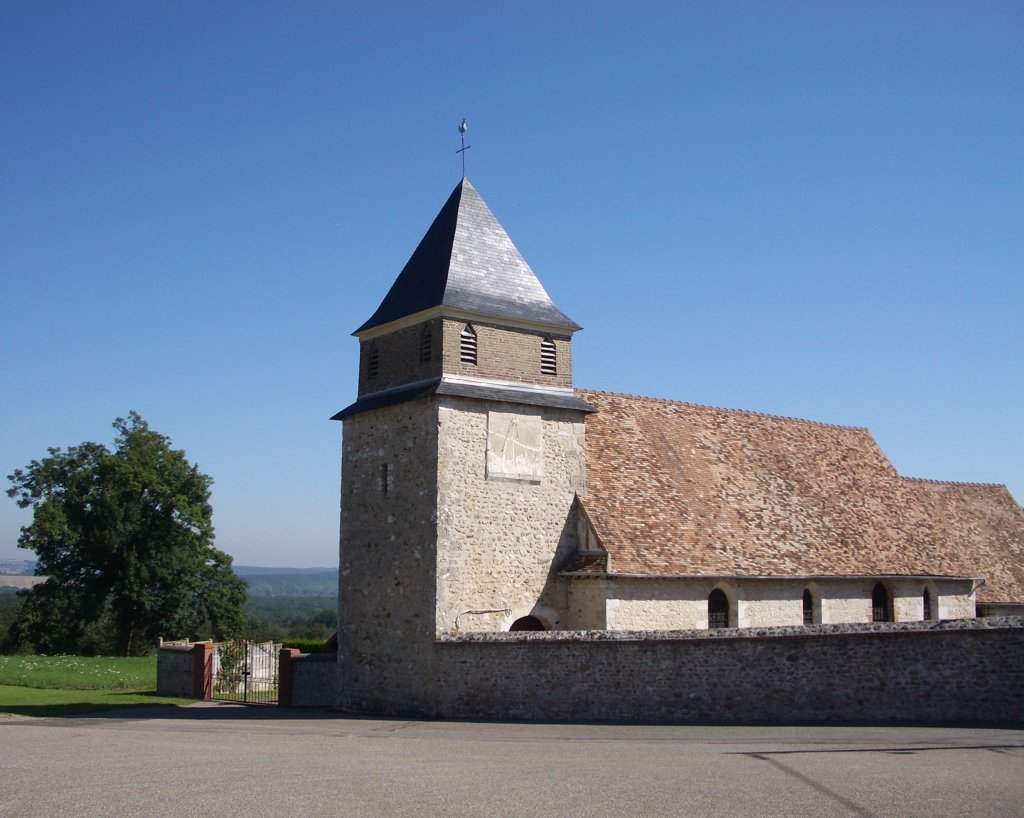
- The church in Villers-sur-le-Roule

- Coat of arms
- Location of Villers-sur-le-Roule
- Location within France Location within Normandy
- Coordinates: 49°11′44″N 1°19′36″E
- Country: France
- Region: Normandy
- Department: Eure
- Arrondissement: Les Andelys
- Canton: Gaillon
- Intercommunality: CA Seine-Eure

Government
  - Mayor (2022–2026): Agnès Labigne
- Area^{1}: 4.32 km^{2} (1.67 sq mi)
- Elevation: 123 m (404 ft)
- Highest elevation: 127 m (417 ft)
- Lowest elevation: 7 m (23 ft)
- Population (2023): 829
  - Density: 192/km^{2} (497/sq mi)
- Time zone: UTC+01:00 (CET)
  - Summer (DST): UTC+02:00 (CEST)
- INSEE/Postal code: 27691 /27940
- ^{1} French Land Register data, which excludes lakes, ponds, glaciers > 1 km^{2} (0.386 sq mi or 247 acres) and river estuaries.

Villers-sur-le-Roule (French pronunciation: [vilɛʁ syʁ lə ʁul]) is a commune in the Eure department in Normandy in northern France.

== Population ==
Historical population
Year	Pop.	±% p.a.
1968	208	—
1975	331	+6.86%
1982	470	+5.14%
1990	540	+1.75%
1999	607	+1.31%
2007	668	+1.20%
2012	788	+3.36%
2017	853	+1.60%
2023	829	−0.47%
Source: INSEE

== See also ==
- Communes of the Eure department
