= Battle of Sassello =

- Part of the War of the Second Coalition
Date	10 April 1800
Location	30 kilometers northwest of Genoa, present-day Italy
Result	Austrian victory

Belligerents
France	(Habsburg monarchy) Austria

Commanders and leaders
Jean-de-Dieu Soult	Prince Hohenzollern

Strength
2,000	20,000

Casualties and losses
1,000 total	1,000 total

The battle of Sassello was a minor skirmish during the war of the Second Coalition, fought on 10 April 1800 between a 2,000-men French force under General Jean-de-Dieu Soult and a largely superior Austrian corps under the command of Prince Prince Hohenzollern. The battle took place 30 kilometers northwest of Genoa, which was at the time under French control but under siege by the Austrians. The skirmish at Sassello ended in favor of the Austrians, with either side losing about 1,000 men but with the Austrians being able to pursue their encirclement of Genoa.

== Bibliography ==
- Pigeard, Alain – Dictionnaire des batailles de Napoléon, Tallandier, Bibliothèque Napoléonienne, 2004, ISBN 2-84734-073-4
