= Saint-Étienne-sous-Bailleul =

- Commune
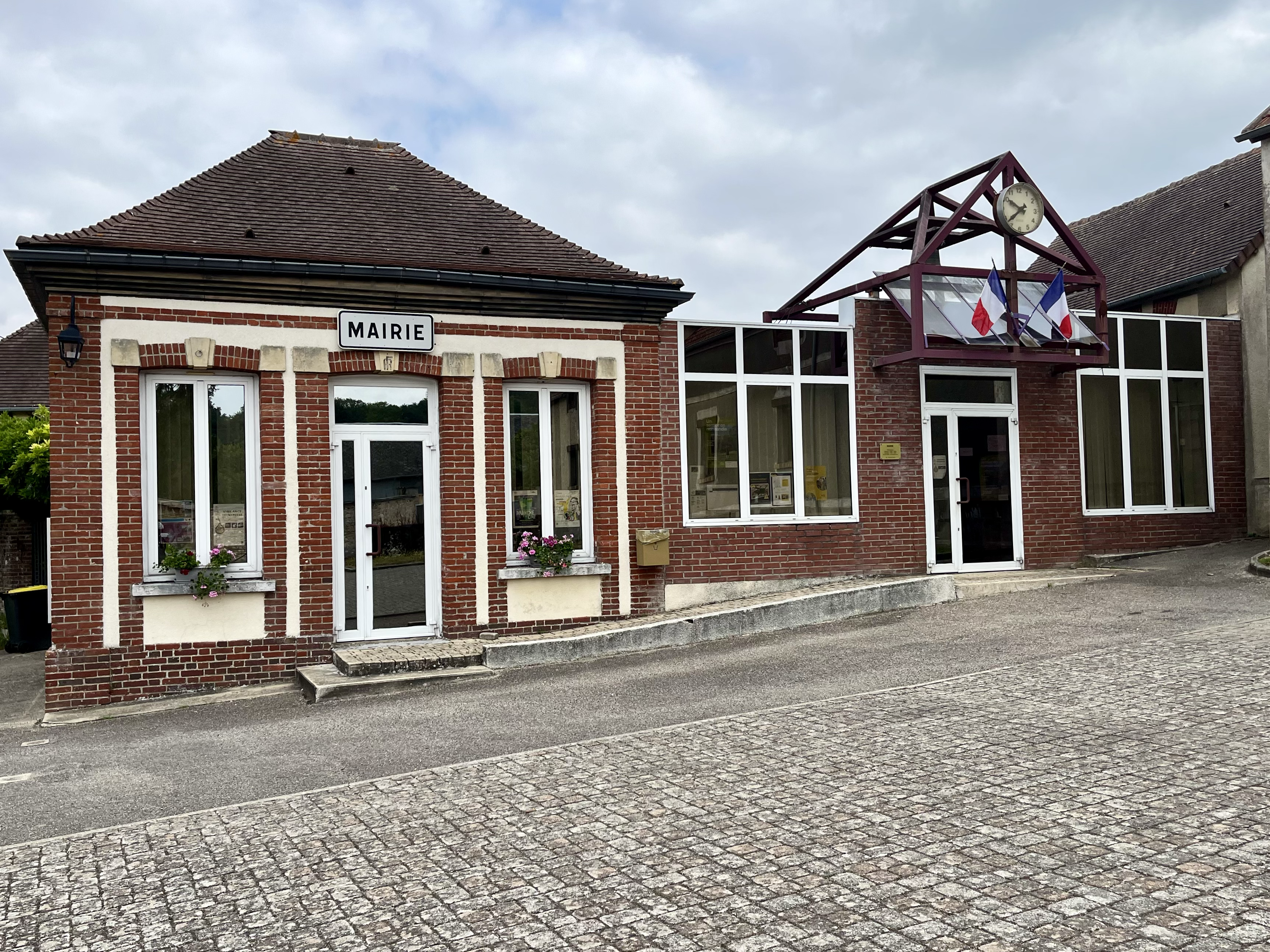
- Saint Etienne sous Bailleul Town hall
- Location of Saint-Étienne-sous-Bailleul
- Location within France Location within Normandy
- Coordinates: 49°07′29″N 1°24′25″E
- Country: France
- Region: Normandy
- Department: Eure
- Arrondissement: Les Andelys
- Canton: Gaillon
- Intercommunality: CA Seine-Eure

Government
  - Mayor (2020–2026): Yvonne Berger
- Area^{1}: 4.34 km^{2} (1.68 sq mi)
- Elevation: 123 m (404 ft)
- Highest elevation: 139 m (456 ft)
- Lowest elevation: 30 m (98 ft)
- Population (2023): 381
  - Density: 87.8/km^{2} (227/sq mi)
- Time zone: UTC+01:00 (CET)
  - Summer (DST): UTC+02:00 (CEST)
- INSEE/Postal code: 27539 /27920
- ^{1} French Land Register data, which excludes lakes, ponds, glaciers > 1 km^{2} (0.386 sq mi or 247 acres) and river estuaries.

Saint-Étienne-sous-Bailleul (French pronunciation: [sɛ̃.t‿etjɛn su bajœl]) is a commune in the Eure department in the Normandy region in northern France.

== Population ==
Historical population
Year	Pop.	±% p.a.
1968	117	—
1975	182	+6.52%
1982	210	+2.07%
1990	281	+3.71%
1999	325	+1.63%
2007	370	+1.63%
2012	418	+2.47%
2017	388	−1.48%
2023	381	−0.30%
Source: INSEE

== See also ==
- Communes of the Eure department
