= Gaillon =

- Commune
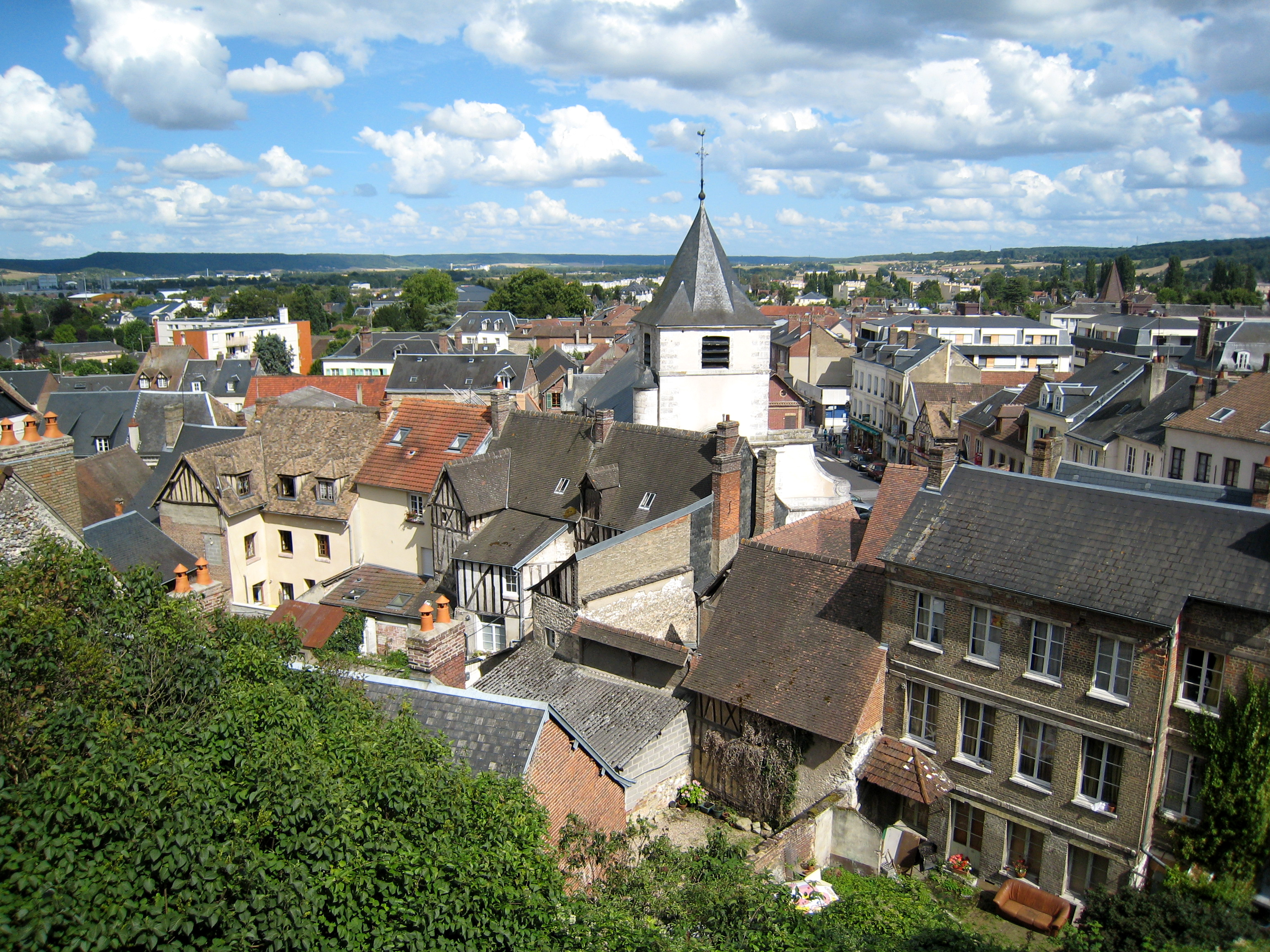
- View of Gaillon from the castle

- Coat of arms
- Location of Gaillon
- Location within France Location within Normandy
- Coordinates: 49°10′N 1°20′E
- Country: France
- Region: Normandy
- Department: Eure
- Arrondissement: Les Andelys
- Canton: Gaillon
- Intercommunality: CA Seine-Eure

Government
  - Mayor (2020–2026): Odile Hantz
- Area^{1}: 10.19 km^{2} (3.93 sq mi)
- Elevation: 59 m (194 ft)
- Highest elevation: 144 m (472 ft)
- Lowest elevation: 8 m (26 ft)
- Population (2023): 6,746
  - Density: 662.0/km^{2} (1,715/sq mi)
- Time zone: UTC+01:00 (CET)
  - Summer (DST): UTC+02:00 (CEST)
- INSEE/Postal code: 27275 /27600
- ^{1} French Land Register data, which excludes lakes, ponds, glaciers > 1 km^{2} (0.386 sq mi or 247 acres) and river estuaries.

Gaillon (French pronunciation: [ɡajɔ̃]) is a commune in the Eure department in northern France.

== History ==
The origins of Gaillon are not really known. In 892, Rollo, a Viking chief, might have ravaged Gaillon and the region, before he became the first prince of the Normans and count of Rouen in 911.

The Gaillon history did begin, when the first dukes of Normandy built a keep to defend the border of Normandy against their enemies : the kings of France. The first castle of Gaillon belonged to a whole system of defence along the Norman border such as Evreux, Pacy-sur-Eure, Vernon, Malassis, Gasny, Baudemont, etc.

In 1192 King Philip II Augustus of France seized the castle in his battle with Richard the Lion Heart to conquer Normandy. Richard decided to build a new one a few kilometers away in Les Andelys on the other bank of the Seine River : Château Gaillard.

In 1262 the castle was exchanged between King Louis IX and Eudes Rigaud (Archbishop of Rouen) and it became the residence of the Rouen archbishops until the French Revolution.

In 1419 the city was put under siege by Thomas of Lancaster, 1st Duke of Clarence and his English army. It was subsequently retaken by the French, and then by the English. Five years later John Plantagenet, Duke of Bedford, ordered the demolition of all fortifications, sparing only the home of the archbishop.

A new castle was built around 1500 - 1509 by Georges d'Amboise, Archbishop of Rouen and Minister of Louis XII in the modern Renaissance style recently imported from Italy. It is often considered the first renaissance castle in France, before the Loire castles were built. Finally it was turned into a prison in 1815, which it remained until 1905.

Gaillon was reached by the Paris-Rouen road in 1730. A lock was built at Notre-Dame-de-la-Garenne on the river Seine in 1840. In 1866 a colony (Douaire), for the agricultural rehabilitation of young offenders, was built in the city.

In 1899 the first hill climb for racing automobiles was begun, climbing through Sainte-Barbe-sur-Gaillon.

== Population ==
Historical population

Year	Pop.	±% p.a.
1793	1,054	—
1800	925	−1.85%
1806	1,050	+2.14%
1821	1,022	−0.18%
1831	1,143	+1.13%
1836	1,143	+0.00%
1841	2,596	+17.83%
1846	2,856	+1.93%
1851	3,206	+2.34%
1856	3,578	+2.22%
1861	3,340	−1.37%
1866	3,219	−0.74%
1872	3,335	+0.59%
1876	3,474	+1.03%
1881	3,488	+0.08%
1886	3,198	−1.72%
1891	3,206	+0.05%
1896	3,016	−1.21%
1901	2,769	−1.69%

Year	Pop.	±% p.a.
1906	2,479	−2.19%
1911	2,612	+1.05%
1921	2,622	+0.04%
1926	1,836	−6.88%
1931	2,023	+1.96%
1936	1,968	−0.55%
1946	2,393	+1.97%
1954	2,562	+0.86%
1962	3,152	+2.62%
1968	3,604	+2.26%
1975	4,318	+2.62%
1982	5,845	+4.42%
1990	6,303	+0.95%
1999	6,861	+0.95%
2007	6,880	+0.03%
2012	7,175	+0.84%
2017	6,924	−0.71%
2023	6,746	−0.43%

Source: EHESS and INSEE (1968-2023)

== See also ==
- Communes of the Eure department
- Château de Gaillon
