= Canton of Gaillon =

Coordinates: 49.16°N 1.33°E

The canton of Gaillon is an administrative division of the Eure department, northern France. Its borders were modified at the French canton reorganisation which came into effect in March 2015. Its seat is in Gaillon.

It consists of the following communes:

1. Ailly
2. Autheuil-Authouillet
3. Cailly-sur-Eure
4. Champenard
5. Clef-Vallée-d'Eure
6. Courcelles-sur-Seine
7. Fontaine-Bellenger
8. Gaillon
9. Heudreville-sur-Eure
10. Saint-Aubin-sur-Gaillon
11. Saint-Étienne-sous-Bailleul
12. Saint-Julien-de-la-Liègue
13. Saint-Pierre-de-Bailleul
14. Saint-Pierre-la-Garenne
15. Les Trois Lacs
16. Le Val-d'Hazey
17. Villers-sur-le-Roule
