= Flamboyant =

Ornate style of late Gothic architecture

Flamboyant style
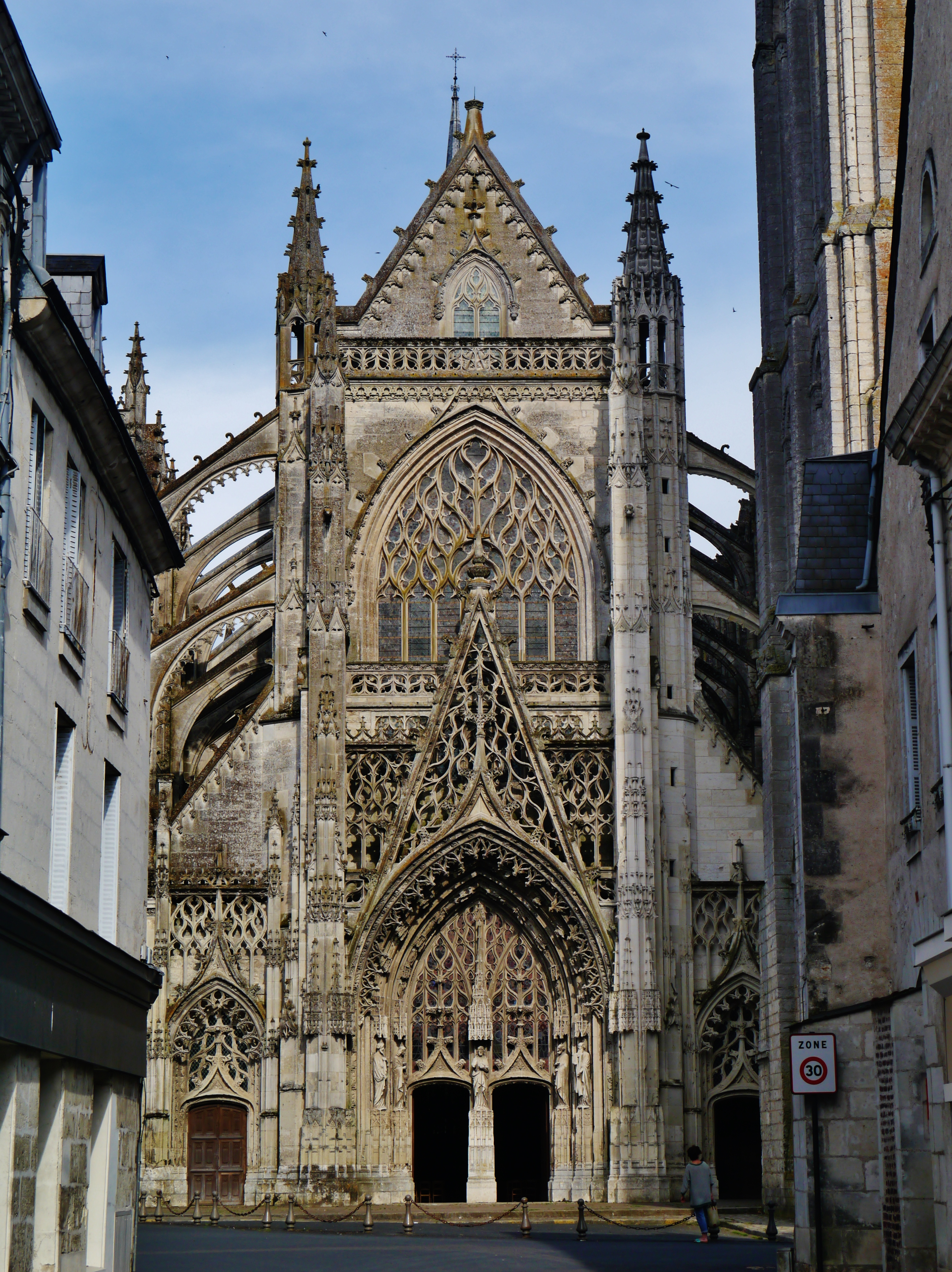
- Façade of the Trinity Abbey, Vendôme (Completed 1507)
- Years active: From 15th to 16th century
- Location: France and Spain

Flamboyant (from French flamboyant 'flaming') is a lavishly decorated style of Gothic architecture that appeared in France and Spain in the 15th century, and lasted until the mid-sixteenth century and the beginning of the Renaissance. Elaborate stone tracery covered both the exterior and the interior. Windows were decorated with a characteristic s-shaped curve. Masonry wall space was reduced further as windows grew even larger. Major examples included the northern spire of Chartres Cathedral, Trinity Abbey, Vendôme, and Burgos Cathedral and Segovia Cathedral in Spain. It was gradually replaced by Renaissance architecture in the 16th century.

== The Period ==
French scholars define Flamboyant as the fourth phase of Gothic style, preceded by Primary Gothic, Classic Gothic and Rayonnant Gothic. British and American historians describe it as a period of Late Gothic architecture, following Early Gothic architecture, High Gothic, and Rayonnant.

== Characteristics ==
Flamboyant is characterized by double curves forming flame-like shapes in the bar-tracery, which give the style its name; by the multiplication of ornamental ribs in the vaults; and by the use of the arch in accolade. Ribs in Flamboyant tracery are recognizable by their flowing forms, which are influenced by the earlier curvilinear tracery of the Second Gothic (or Second Pointed) styles. Very tall and narrow pointed arches and gables, particularly double-curved ogee arches, are common in buildings of the Flamboyant style. In most regions of Europe, Late Gothic styles like Flamboyant replaced the earlier Rayonnant style and other early variations.

The style was particularly popular in Continental Europe. In the 15th and 16th centuries, architects and masons in the Kingdom of France, the Crown of Castile, the Duchy of Milan, and Central Europe exchanged expertise through theoretical texts, architectural drawings, and travel, and spread the use of Flamboyant ornament and design across Europe. Notable examples of Flamboyant style are the west rose window of Sainte-Chapelle (1485–1498); the west porch of the Church of Saint-Maclou, Rouen, (c.1500–1514); the west front of Troyes Cathedral (early 16th century), and a very early example, the upper tracery of Great West Window of York Minster (1338–1339) in England. Further major examples include the chapel of the Constable of Castile (Spanish: Capilla del Condestable) at Burgos Cathedral (1482–94); Notre-Dame de l'Épine, Champagne; the north spire of Chartres Cathedral (1500s–); and Segovia Cathedral (1525–).

The Late Gothic style appeared in Central Europe with the construction of the new Prague Cathedral (1344–) under the direction of Peter Parler. This model of rich, variegated tracery and intricate reticulated (net-work) rib-vaulting was widely used in the Late Gothic of continental Europe, and was emulated in the collegiate churches and cathedrals, and by urban parish churches that rivalled them in size and magnificence. Use of the ogee was especially common.

In the late 15th and early 16th centuries, Flamboyant forms spread from France to the Iberian Peninsula, where the Isabelline style became the dominant mode of prestige construction in the Crown of Castile, the portion of Spain governed by Isabella I of Castille. During the same period, Flamboyant features also appeared in Manueline style in the Kingdom of Portugal. In Central Europe, the Sondergotik ("Special Gothic") style was contemporaneous with Flamboyant in France and the Isabelline in Spain.

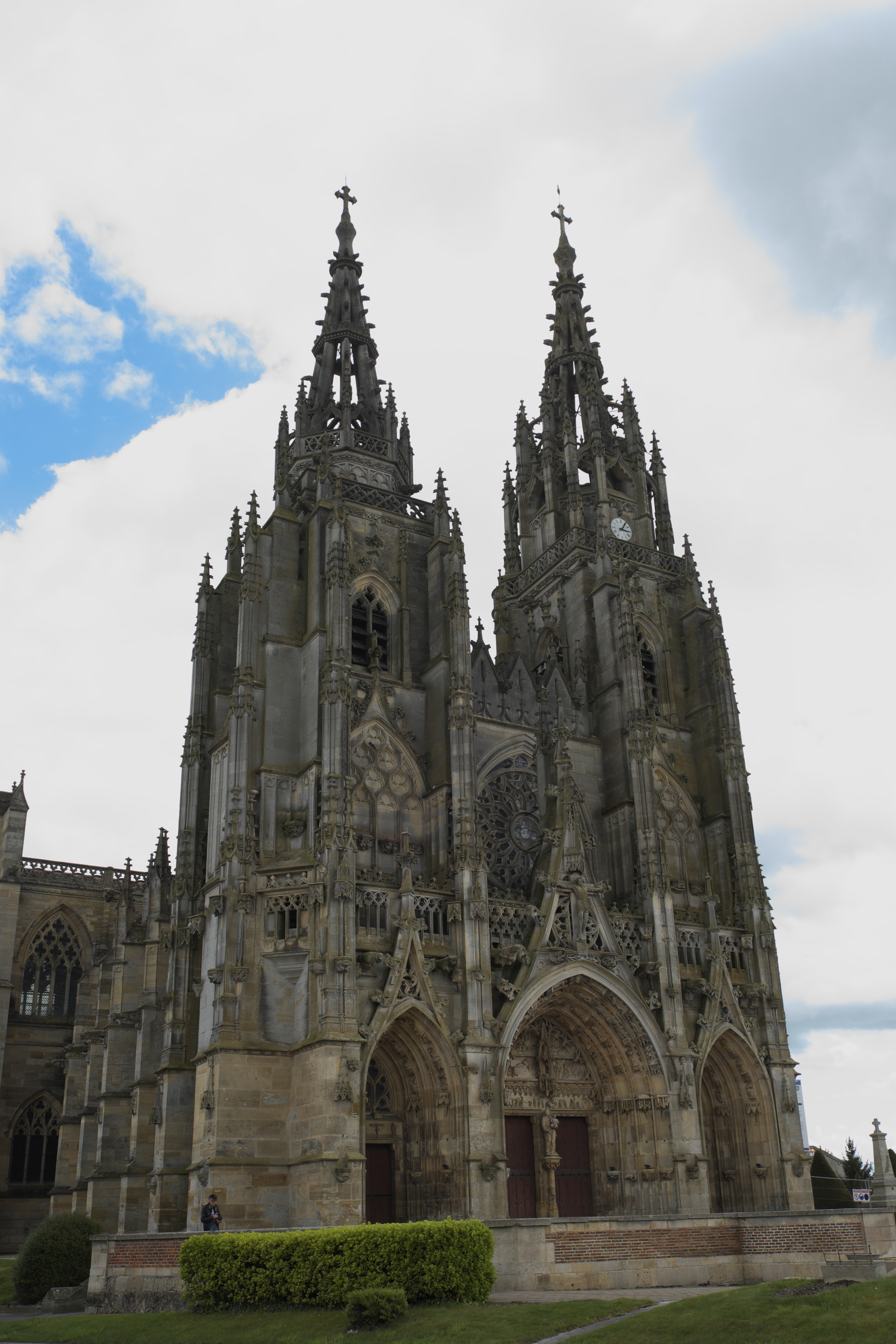
Notre-Dame de l'Épine, west front (1405–1527)

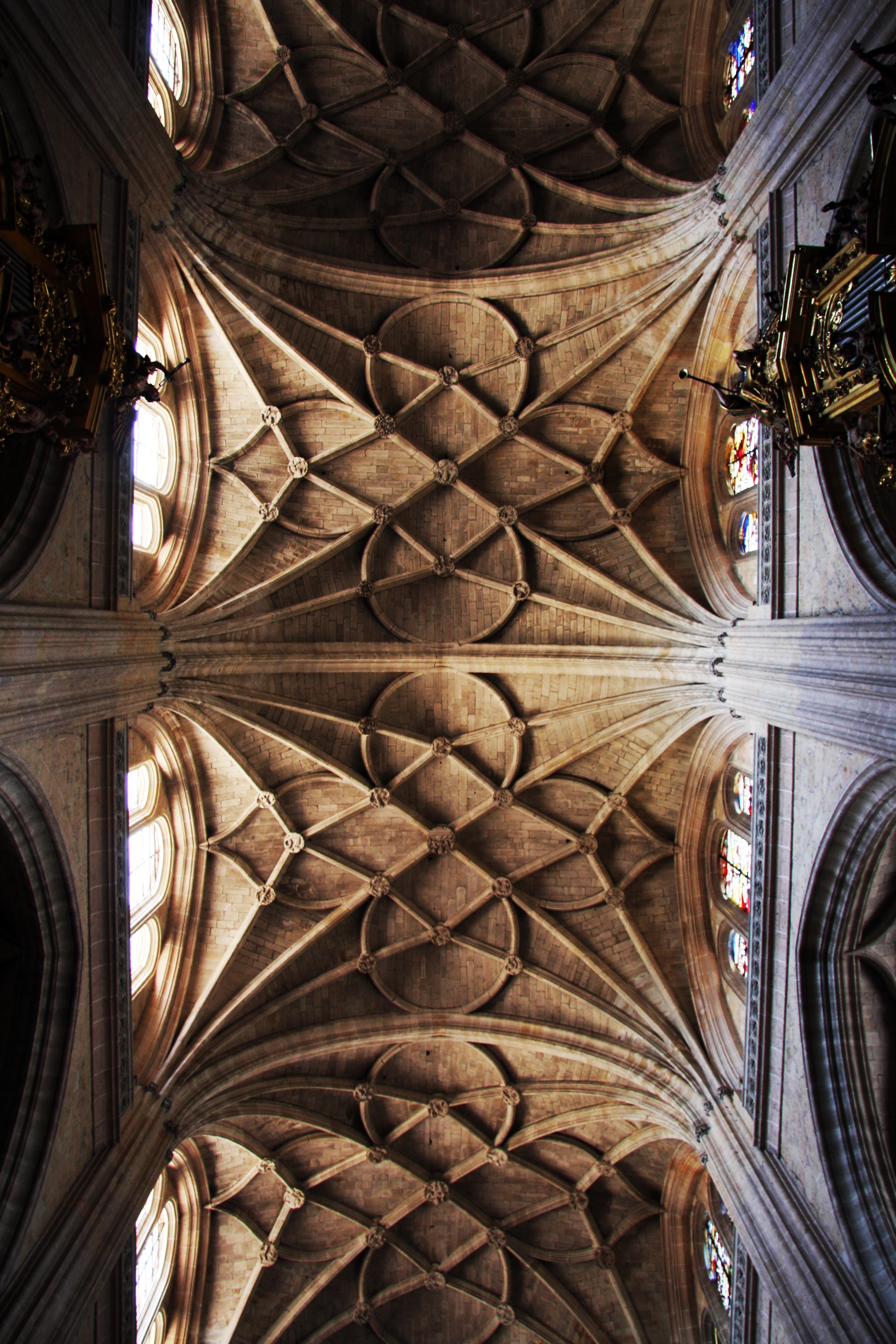
Flamboyant rib vaulting of Segovia Cathedral, nave (1525–1577)

The term "Flamboyant" was first used by the French artist Eustache-Hyacinthe Langlois (1777–1837) in 1843, and then by the English historian Edward Augustus Freeman in 1851. In architectural history, the Flamboyant is considered the last phase of French Gothic architecture and appeared in the closing decades of the 14th century, succeeding the Rayonnant style and prevailing until its gradual replacement by Renaissance architecture during the first third of the 16th century.

Notable examples of Flamboyant in France include the west rose window of Sainte-Chapelle in Paris, the transepts of Sens Cathedral and Beauvais Cathedral, the façade of Sainte-Chapelle de Vincennes and the west front of Trinity Abbey, Vendôme. Significant examples of civil architecture include the Palais Jacques Cœur in Bourges and the Hôtel de Cluny in Paris.

== Origins ==
Although the precise origin of the Flamboyant style remain unclear, it likely emerged in northern France and the County of Flanders during the late 14th century. Parts of these lands were involved in the cloth trade with the Kingdom of England or were under the control of John of Lancaster, 1st Duke of Bedford, regent of France for his nephew Henry VI, King of France from 1422 to 1453. Through this direct connection, the flickering, flame-like tracery motifs after which the style is named may have been "inspired by the English Decorated style", though this is disputed. In addition, the Duchy of Normandy, was in personal union with England until the 13th century, while during the Hundred Years' War, Rouen, capital of Normandy, was English territory from 1419 until 1449. Earlier in the conflict, John, Duke of Berry was taken hostage in England. The ongoing war provided many opportunities for cultural exchange, as evidenced by the fireplace in the ducal palace in Poitiers and the panelled, screen-like upper parts of the west façade of Rouen Cathedral.

Tracery patterns of the 14th century are either rich, flame-like forms inspired by the English Decorated (e.g. west façade of York Minster) or the "panelled severity" of English Perpendicular style (e.g. King's College Chapel, Cambridge). According to Robert Bork, "continental builders borrowed almost exclusively from the Decorated style, which had largely passed out of fashion in England by 1360, rather than from the more current Perpendicular style". The clear rejection of the grid-like forms in France indicates some awareness of the contrasting styles. The emergence of the Flamboyant style was a gradual process. What has been termed "proto-Flamboyant" appeared at the Saint-Ouen Abbey, Rouen in the inner wall of the north transept between 1390 and 1410. No flowing, double-curved forms were used there but the "eight double lancet panels seem to spin around a quatrefoil center". Although this rose motif appears dynamic and in motion, its design was not based on the double-curve. It is an early example of experimentation with tracery forms that anticipates the use of flowing, double-curve forms in Normandy. More so than the great churches of northern France, palaces constructed by royal and elite patrons provided "fertile grounds for innovation" with curvilinear tracery in France while England turned to the Perpendicular style.

== France ==
The term "Flamboyant" was coined in the early 19th century, primarily to refer to French monuments with flame-like, curvilinear tracery that were constructed between circa 1380 and 1515. The Flamboyant style appeared in France during the Hundred Years' War against England (1337–1444). Despite this, the construction of new cathedrals, churches, and civil structures—as well as additions to existing monuments—went ahead in France and continued throughout the early 16th century. Features of the Flamboyant style are richly articulated façades, very high, lavishly decorated porches, towers, and spires. Early examples included the castle chapel of John, Duke of Berry, at Riom (1382), the fireplace in the great chamber (1390s) of the ducal palace at Poitiers, and in the La Grange chapels (c. 1375) at Amiens Cathedral.

Residences of the nobility were among the earliest structures that were entirely built in the Flamboyant style. The Palais Jacques Coeur, residence of the treasurer of the King at Bourges was built between 1444 and 1451. It combines residential and official wings that are richly decorated with gables, turrets, and chimneys arranged around a central courtyard. The Château de Châteaudun, which was transformed between 1459 and 1468 by Jehan de Dunois, the half-brother of king Charles VI, and was one earliest residences built for leisure in France. The Château has one of the seven remaining Sainte-Chapelle chapels and an elegant spiral staircase. The corresponding façade is decorated with characteristic flame-like tracery in the windows and also includes dormers with fleur-de-lys, denoting the owner's status as a descendant of Charles V. Another notable example is the Hôtel de Cluny in Paris, originally the residence of the abbot of Cluny, now the Museum of the Middle Ages. Flamboyant details are found in the chapel, the doorways, windows, tower, and roof-line. A late example of Flamboyant civil architecture in France is the Parlement de Normandie, now the Palais de Justice of Rouen (1499–1528), which has slender, crocketed pinnacles and lucarnes terminated with fleurons. They were designed by architects Roger Ango and Roulland Le Roux.

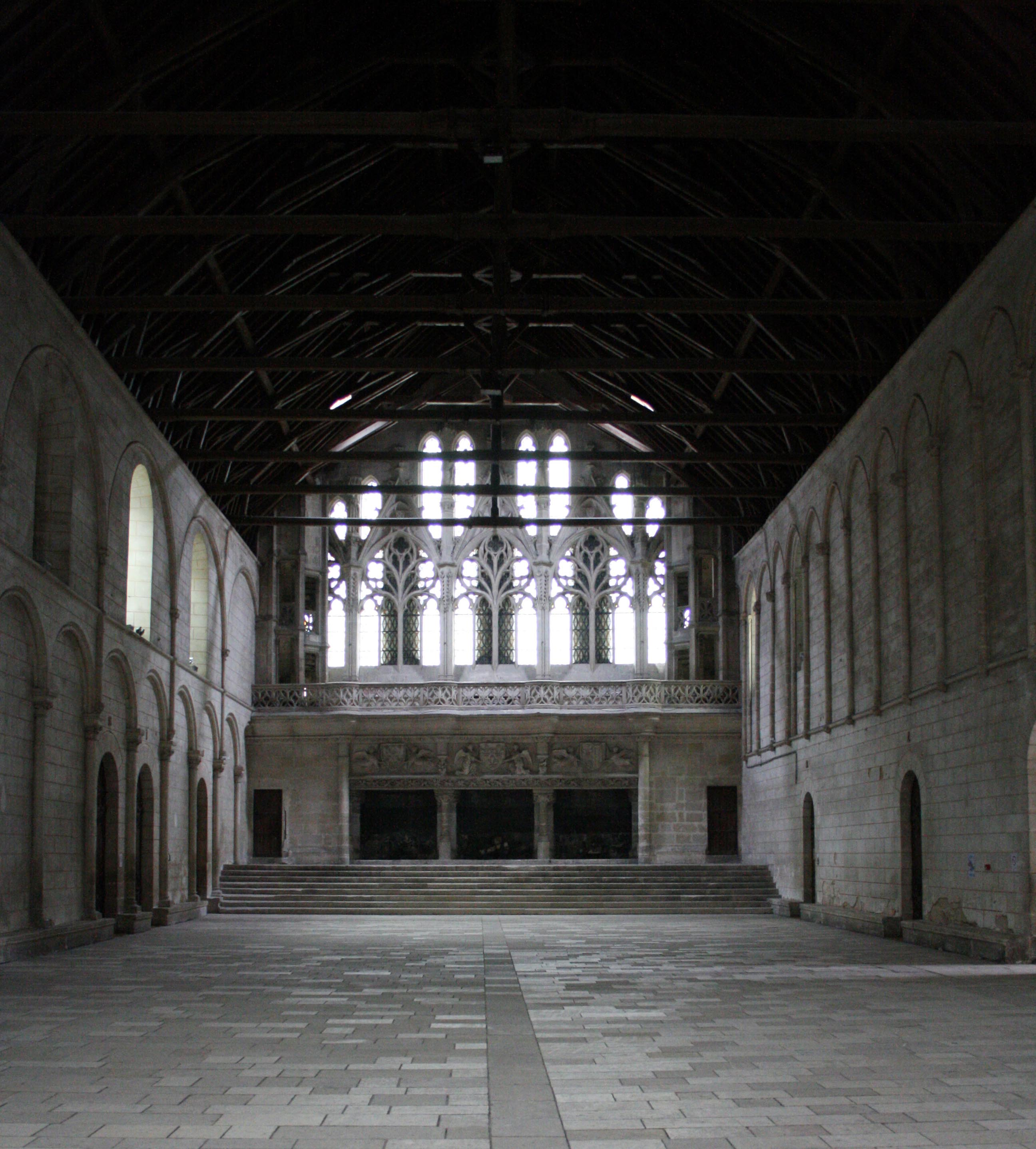
Flamboyant openwork tracery, fireplace and chimney, Salle des pas perdus, Palace of Poitiers (c. 1390)

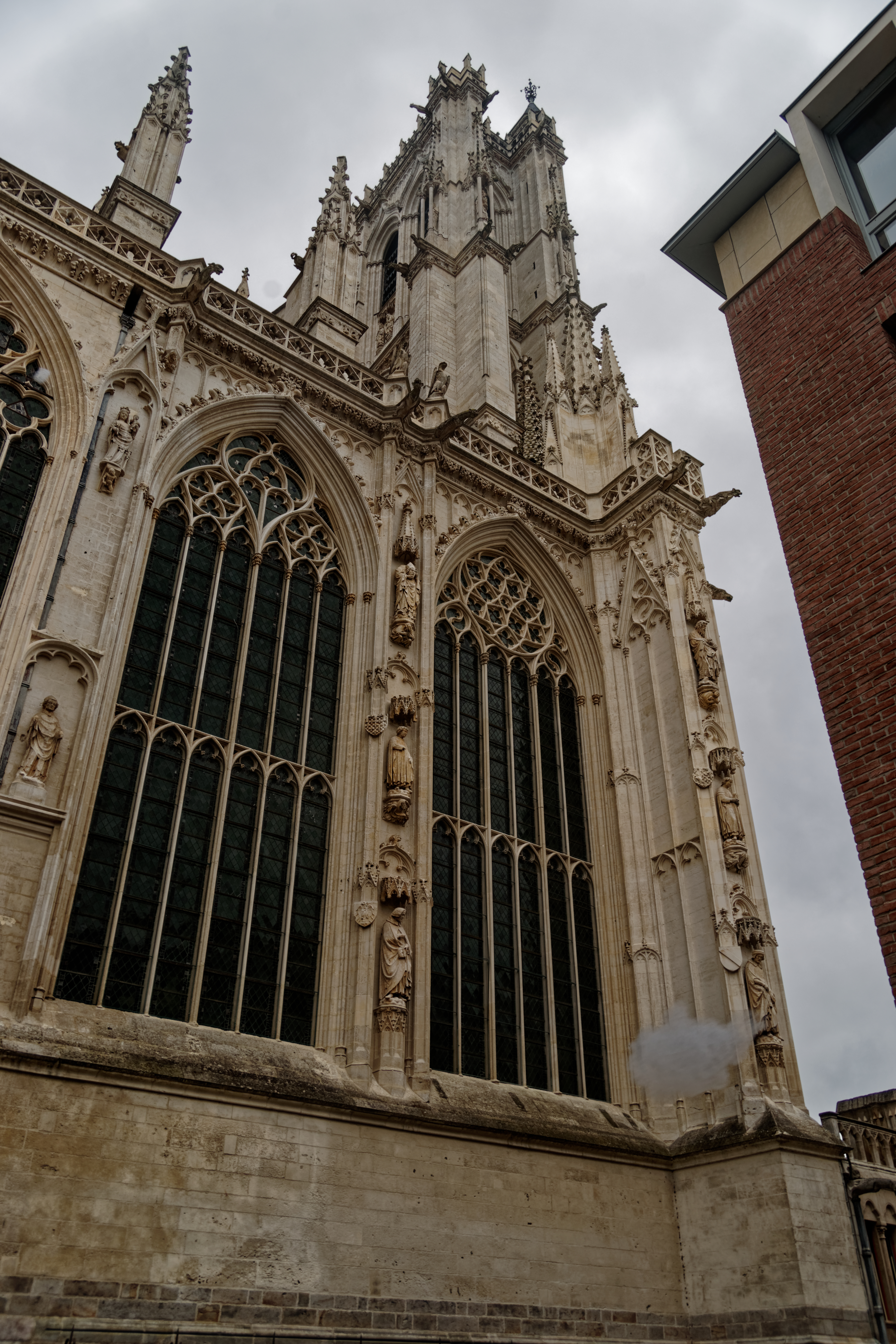
Chapels commissioned by Jean de la Grange, northwest corner, Amiens Cathedral (c. 1375). Note the use of curvilinear mouchettes and soufflets at the top of the windows.

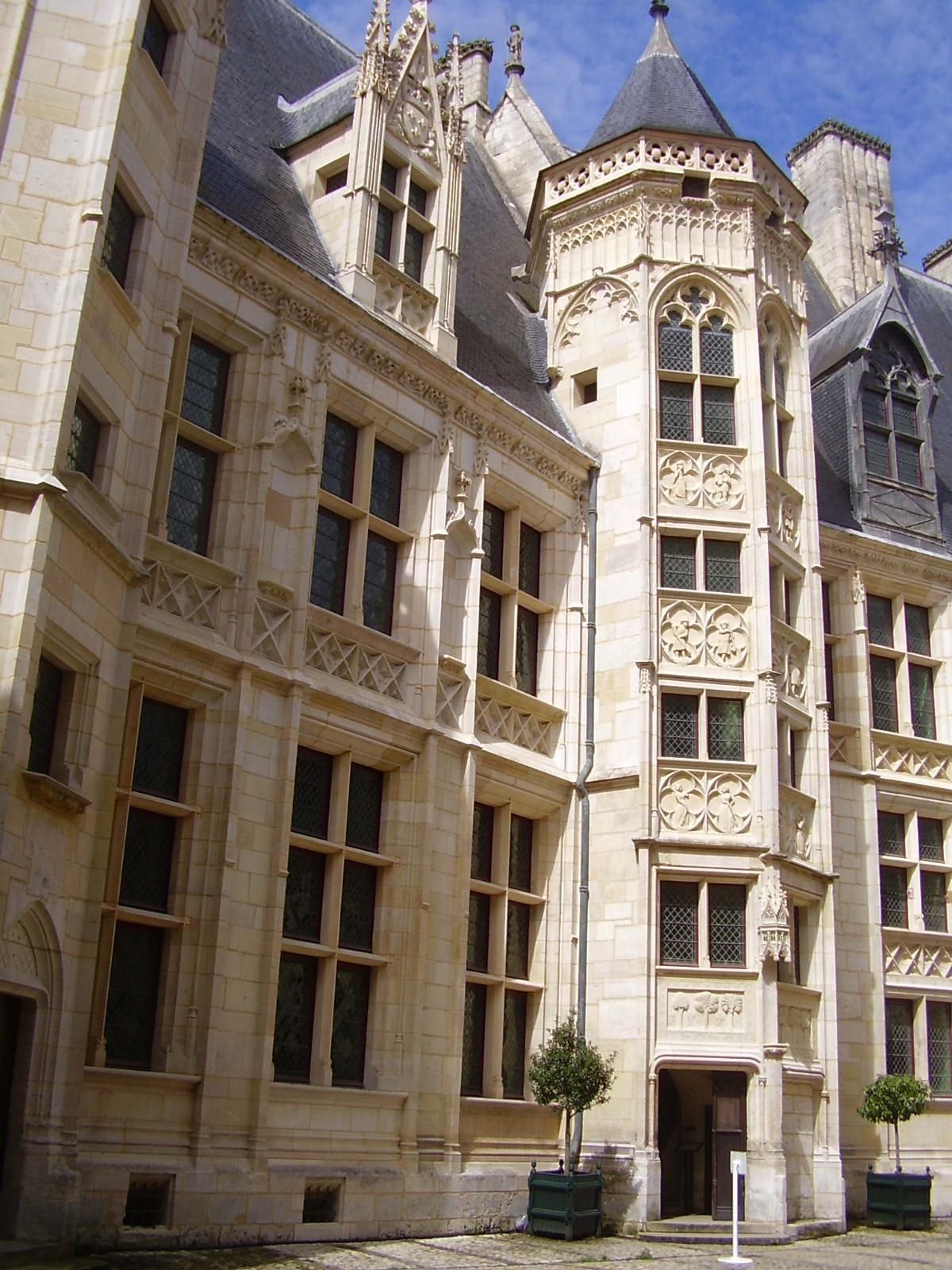
Palais Jacques Coeur, Bourges (1444–1451)

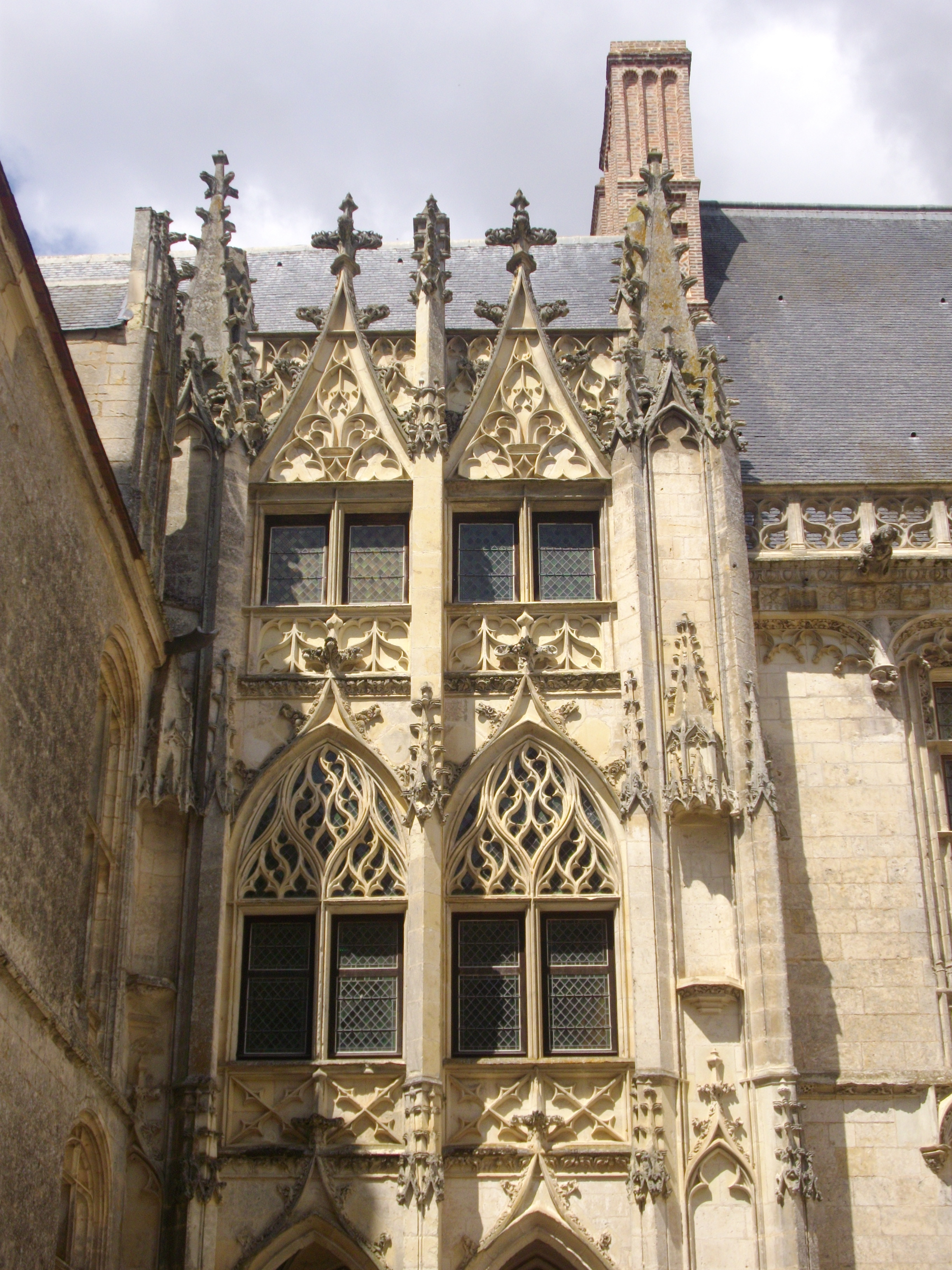
The Dunois staircase, Château de Châteaudun (1459–1468)

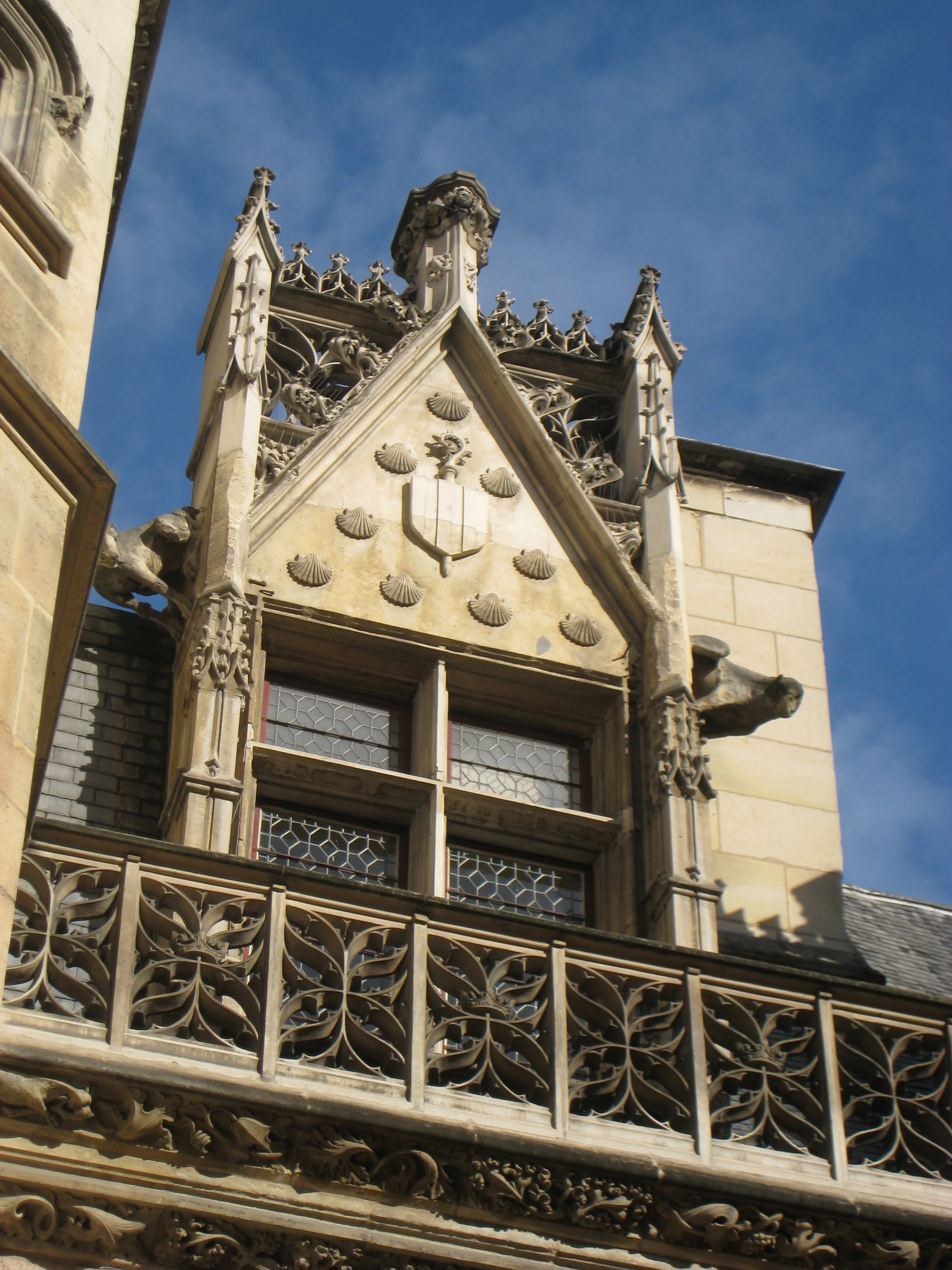
Gable window of the Hotel de Cluny, Paris (15th century)

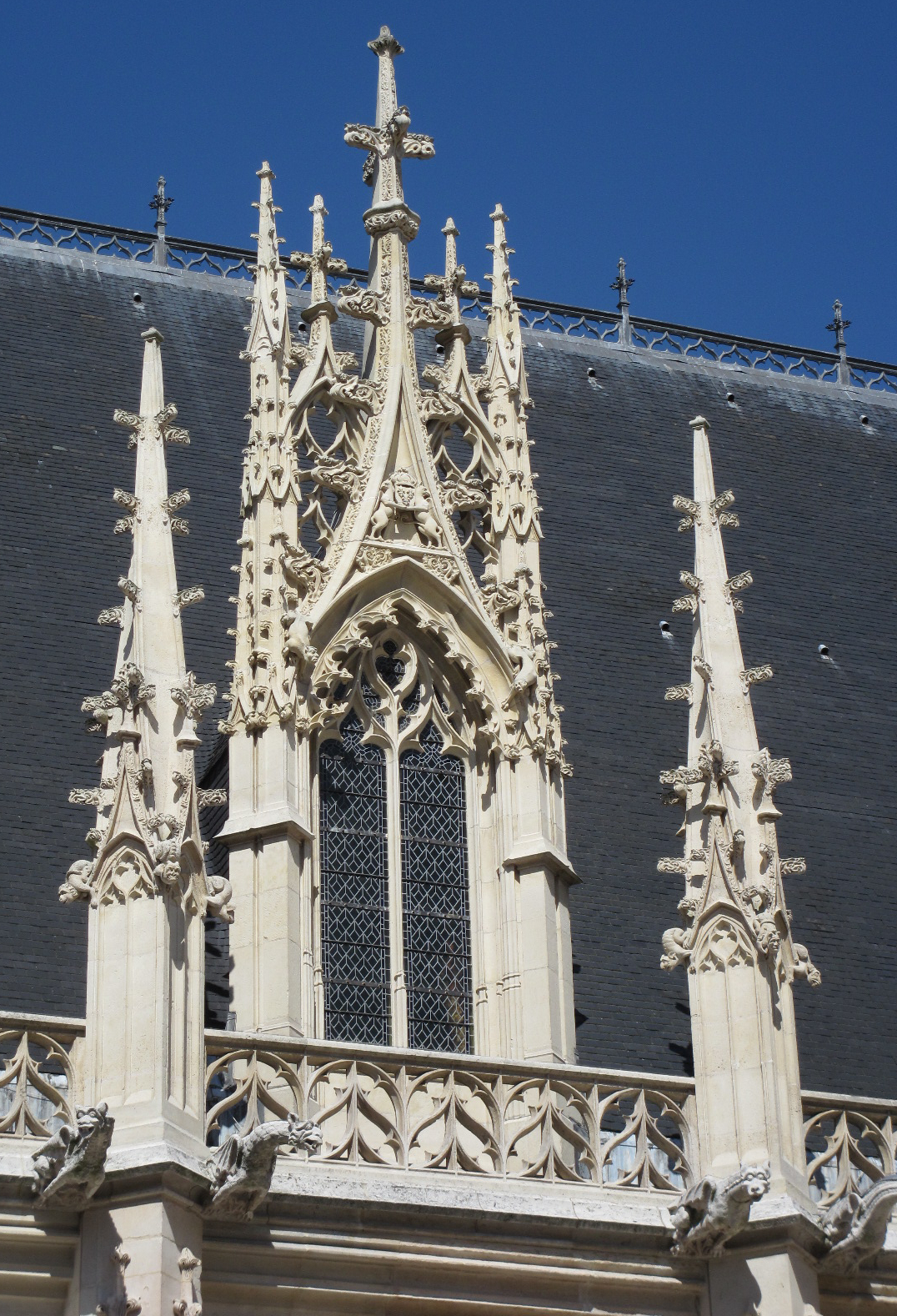
Lucarne, west façade of the former Parliament of Normandy, now the Palais de Justice, Rouen (1499–1507)

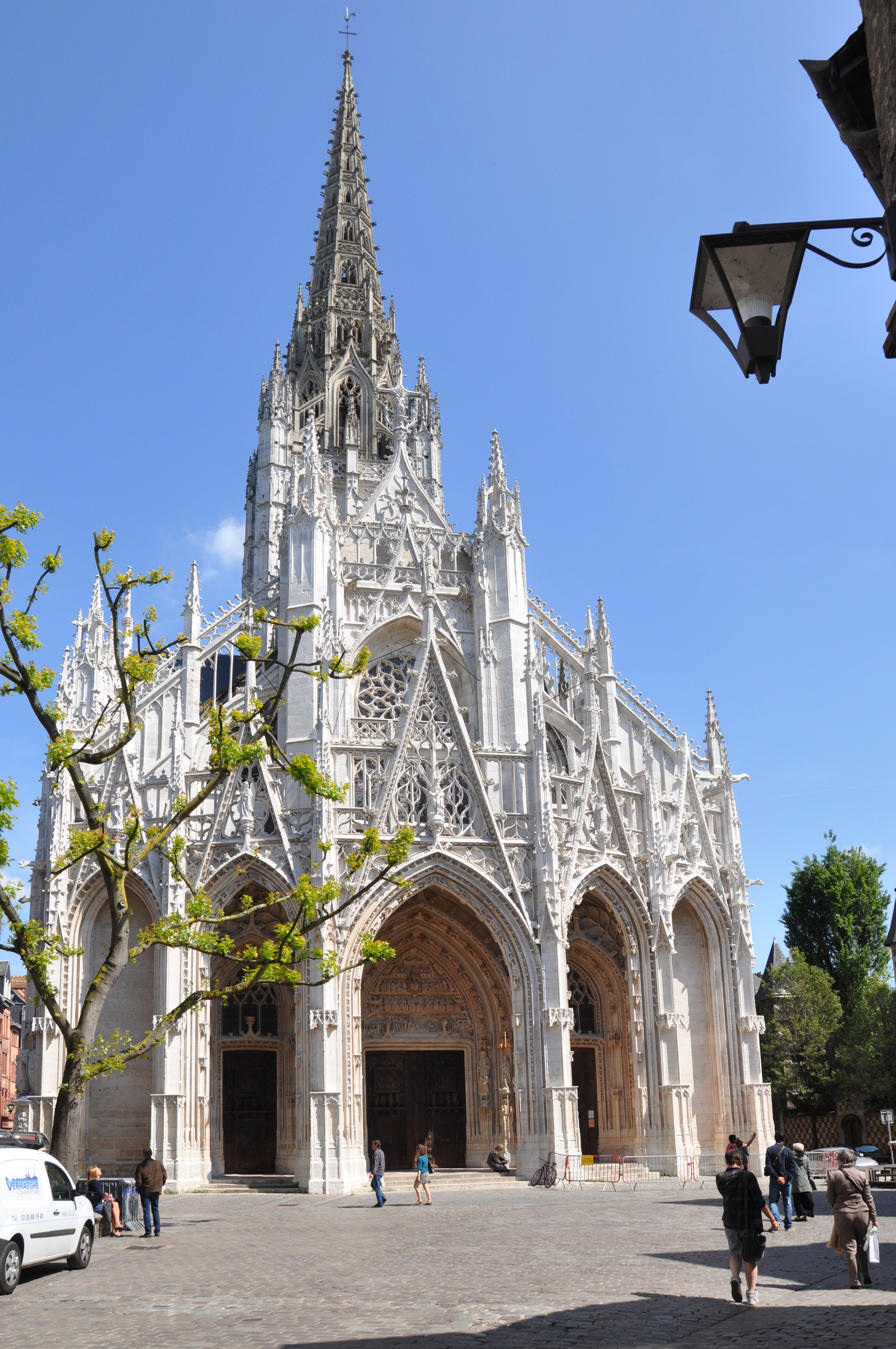
West porch of the Church of Saint-Maclou, Rouen, (1434–1521)

In 15th-century France, few churches were constructed entirely in the Flamboyant style; it was more common to commission additions to existing structures. One exception is the Church of Saint-Maclou in Rouen, which was commissioned by the Dufour family during the English occupation of the town. It was designed by the master mason Pierre Robin, who was in charge of construction from 1434 until the church was consecrated in 1521. The church, which is referred to as "monumental architecture in the miniature", has double-tiered flying buttresses, fully developed transept façades with portals, curvilinear rose windows, and a projecting polygonal west porch with openwork ogee gables. The influence of Pierre Robin's design lasted into the 16th century, when Roulland Le Roux oversaw work on the upper parts of the Tour de Beurre ("Butter Tower") (1485–1507) and the central portal (1507–1510) of Rouen Cathedral. Increasing specialization in Gothic workshops and lodges led to the sophisticated forms characteristic of structures that were completed in the early 16th century, such as the south façade and porch of the Church of Notre-Dame de Louviers (1506–1510) and the north tower of Chartres Cathedral, which were designed by architect Jehan de Beauce (1507–1513).

The style also appeared early in Île-de-France. The west rose window of the Sainte-Chapelle was made between 1485 and 1498 by a glass artist known only as The Master of the Life of Saint-John the Baptist. It is nine meters in diameter, with 89 sections of glass, of which all but nine are original. The curling tracery of the window spills out onto the exterior of the west façade.

The Sainte-Chapelle de Vincennes, a royal chapel constructed by King Charles V of France, is a notable example. It was located just outside Paris, next to the massive Château de Vincennes and was inspired by the Sainte-Chapelle in Paris. The Sainte-Chapelle de Vincennes had a single floor and the windows, consisting of curvilinear tracery, covered nearly all of the walls. Construction began in 1379 but was halted by the Hundred Years War and the window and west front were completed until 1552. A significant Flamboyant landmark in Paris is the Tour Saint-Jacques, which is all that remains of the Church of Saint-Jacques-de-la-Boucherie ("Saint James of the butchers"), which was built 1509–23 and was located close to Les Halles, the Paris central market. (Note: The church was demolished in 1797 following the French Revolution. See Mérimée database)

In the Loire Valley, the west front of Tours Cathedral was a notable example of Flamboyant architecture. As the French Renaissance began with the royal chateaux along the Loire, the towers of the cathedral were updated with domes and lanterns in the new style, completed in 1507.

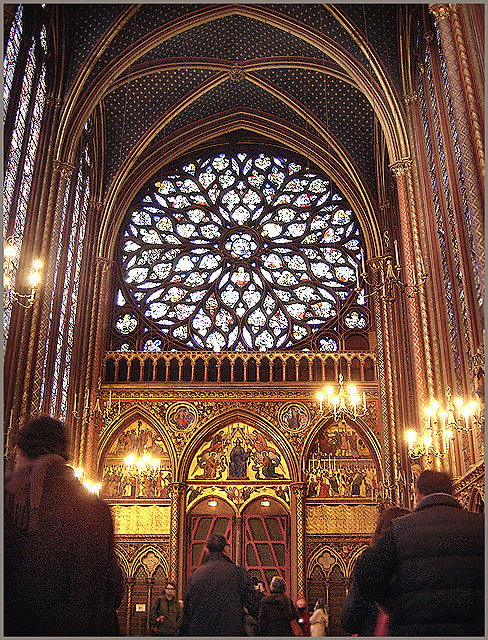
West rose window of Sainte-Chapelle, Paris (1485-1498)

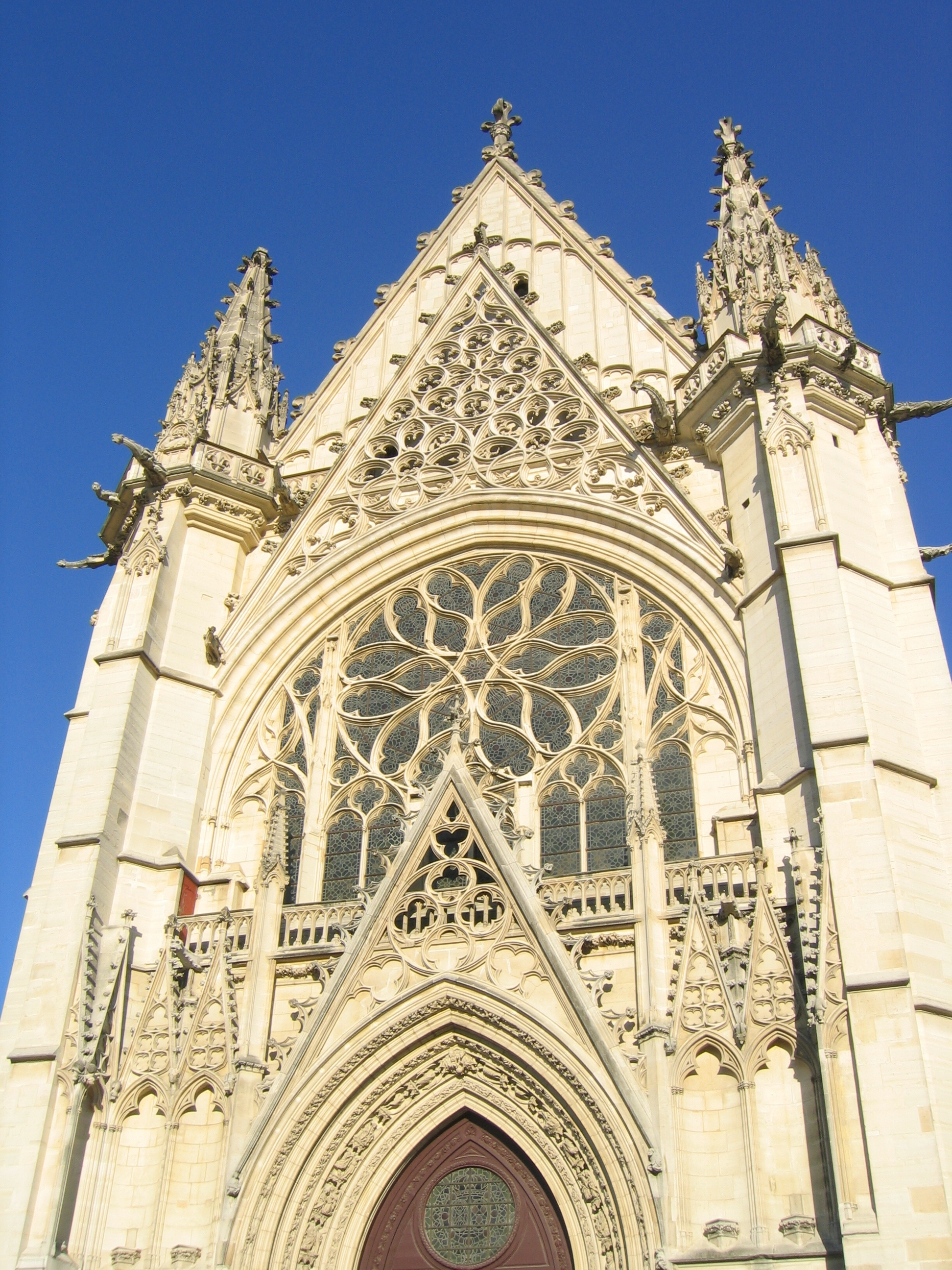
Façade of Sainte-Chapelle de Vincennes (completed 1559)

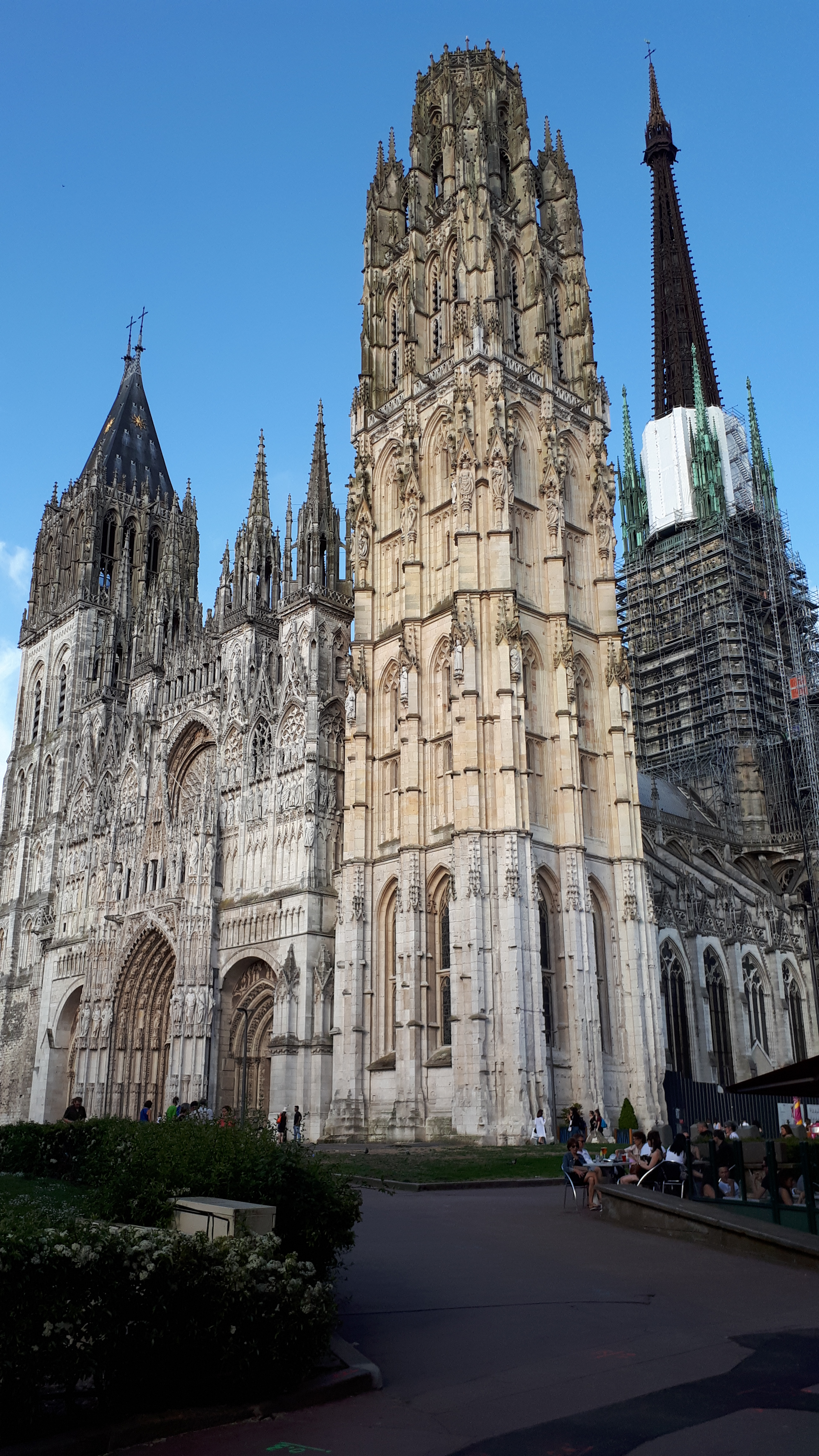
The Butter Tower of Rouen Cathedral (1485–1507)

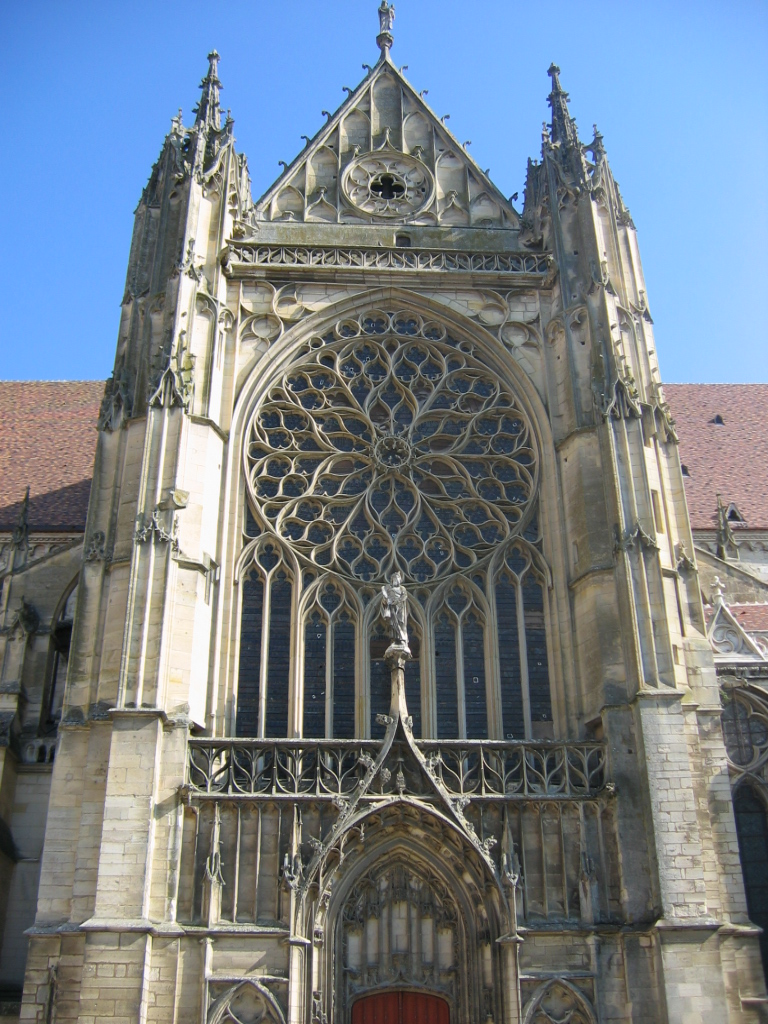
Rose window and façade of south transept, Sens Cathedral (1490–1518)

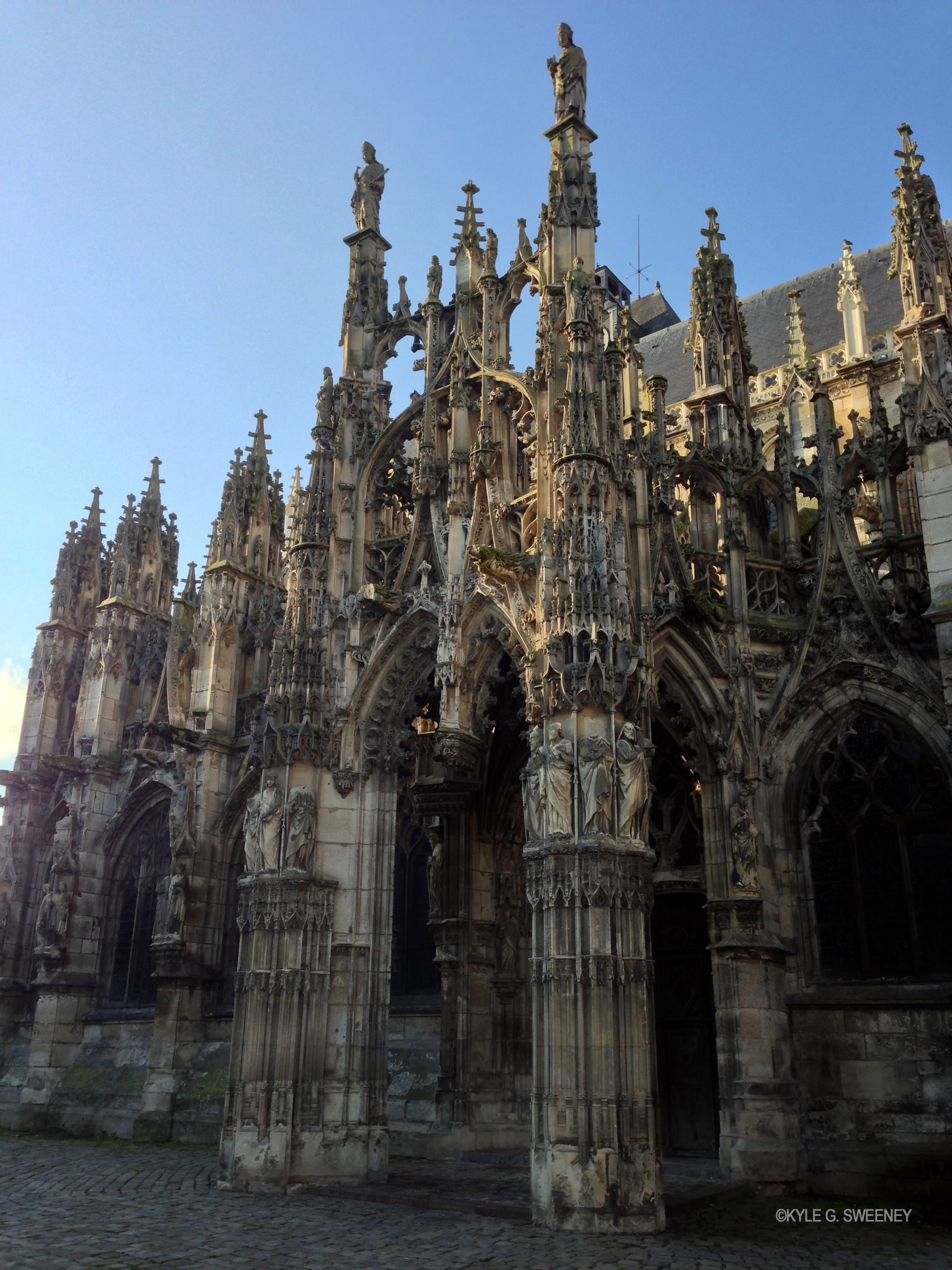
South porch of Notre-Dame de Louviers (1506–1510)

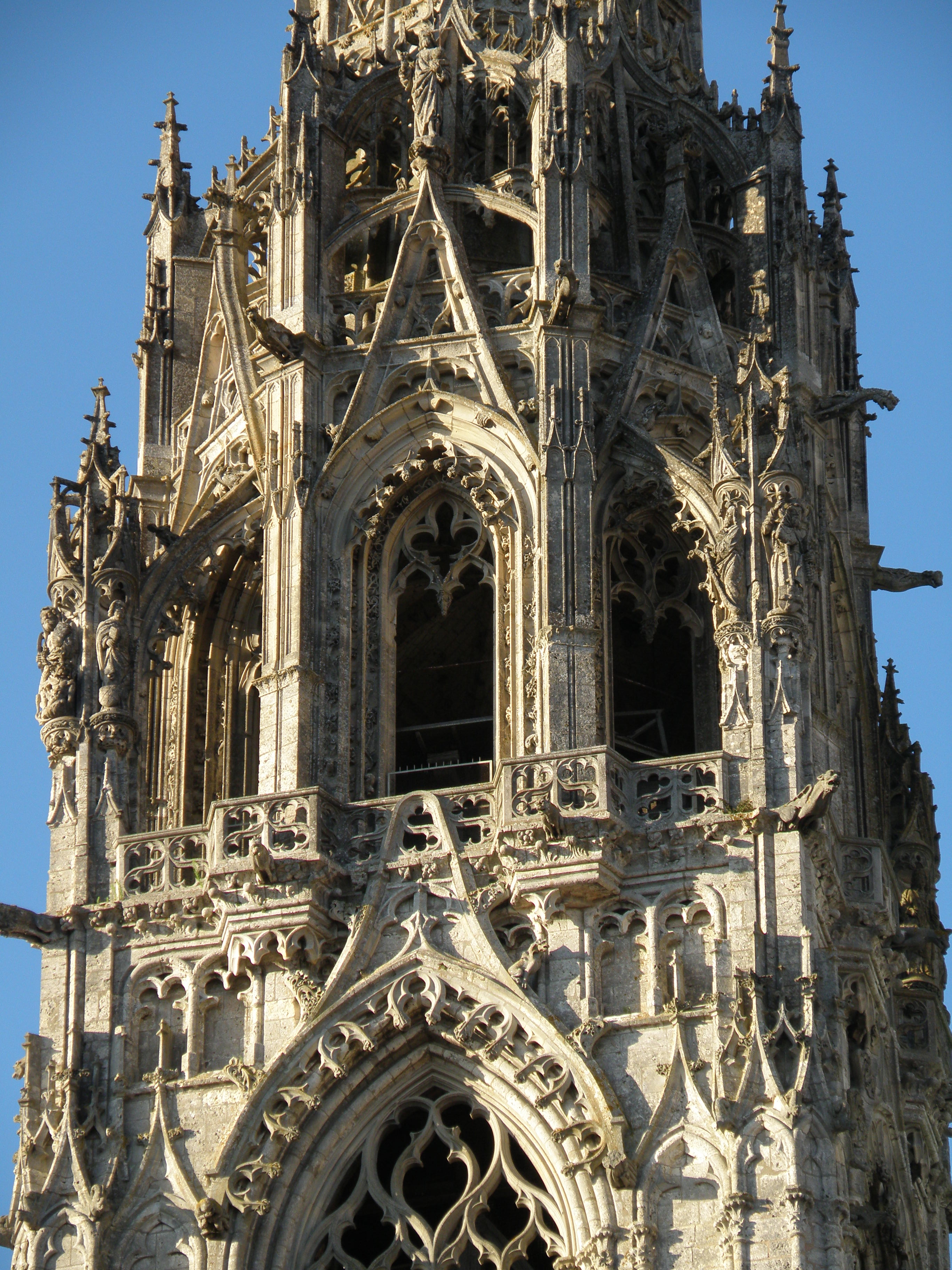
Detail of the North Tower of Chartres Cathedral (1507–1513)

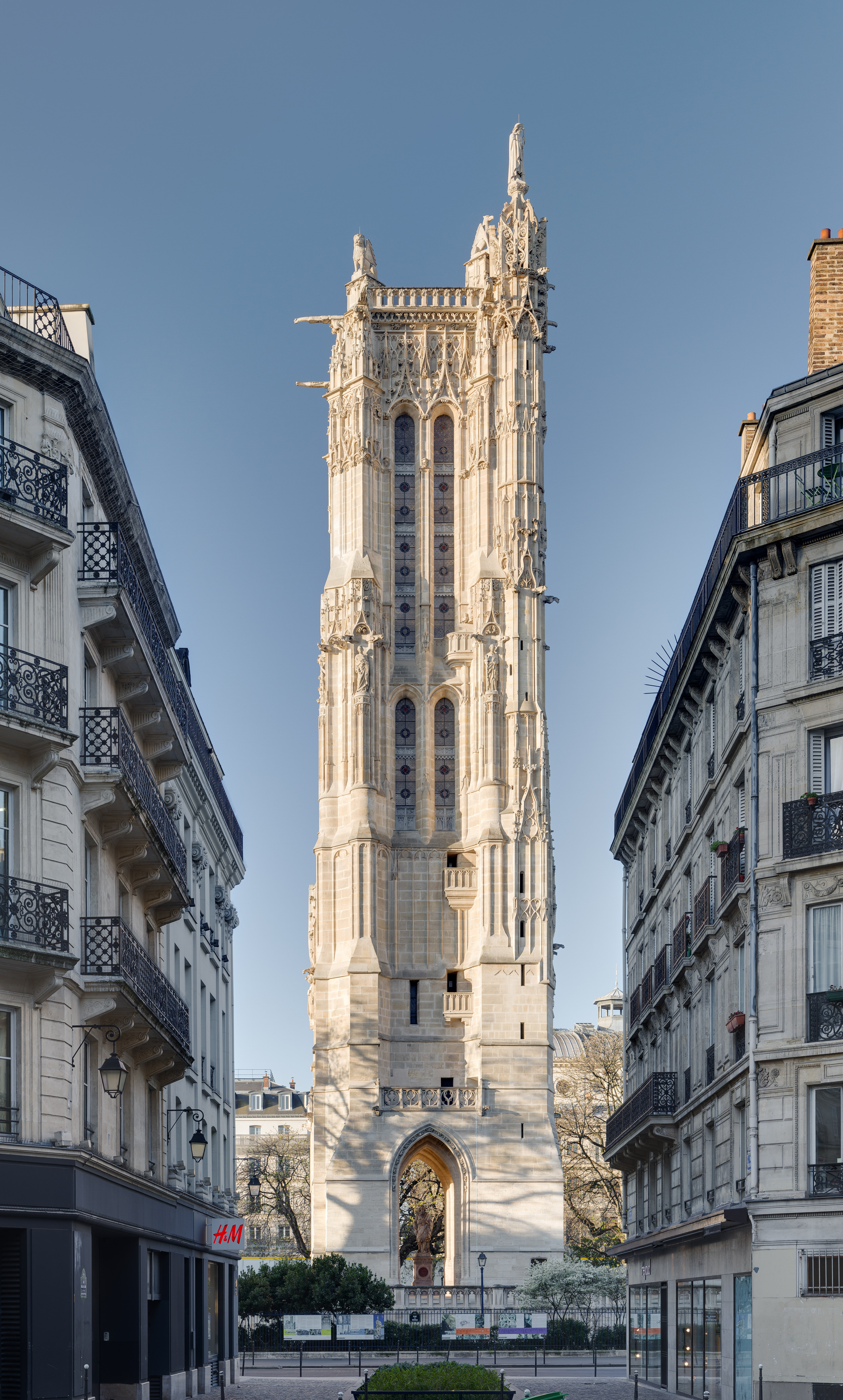
Tour Saint-Jacques, Paris (1509–1523)

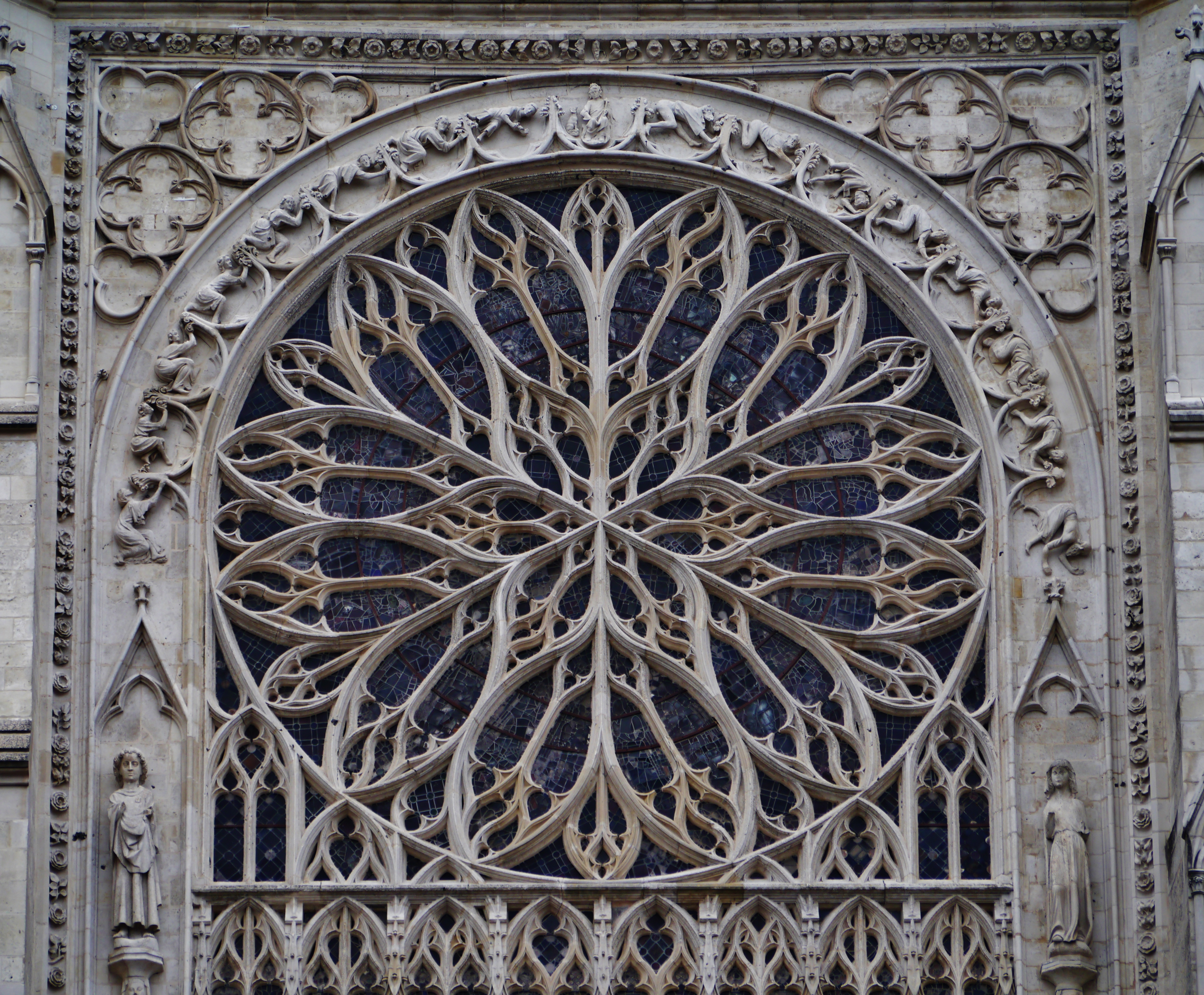
South rose window of Amiens Cathedral (16th c.)

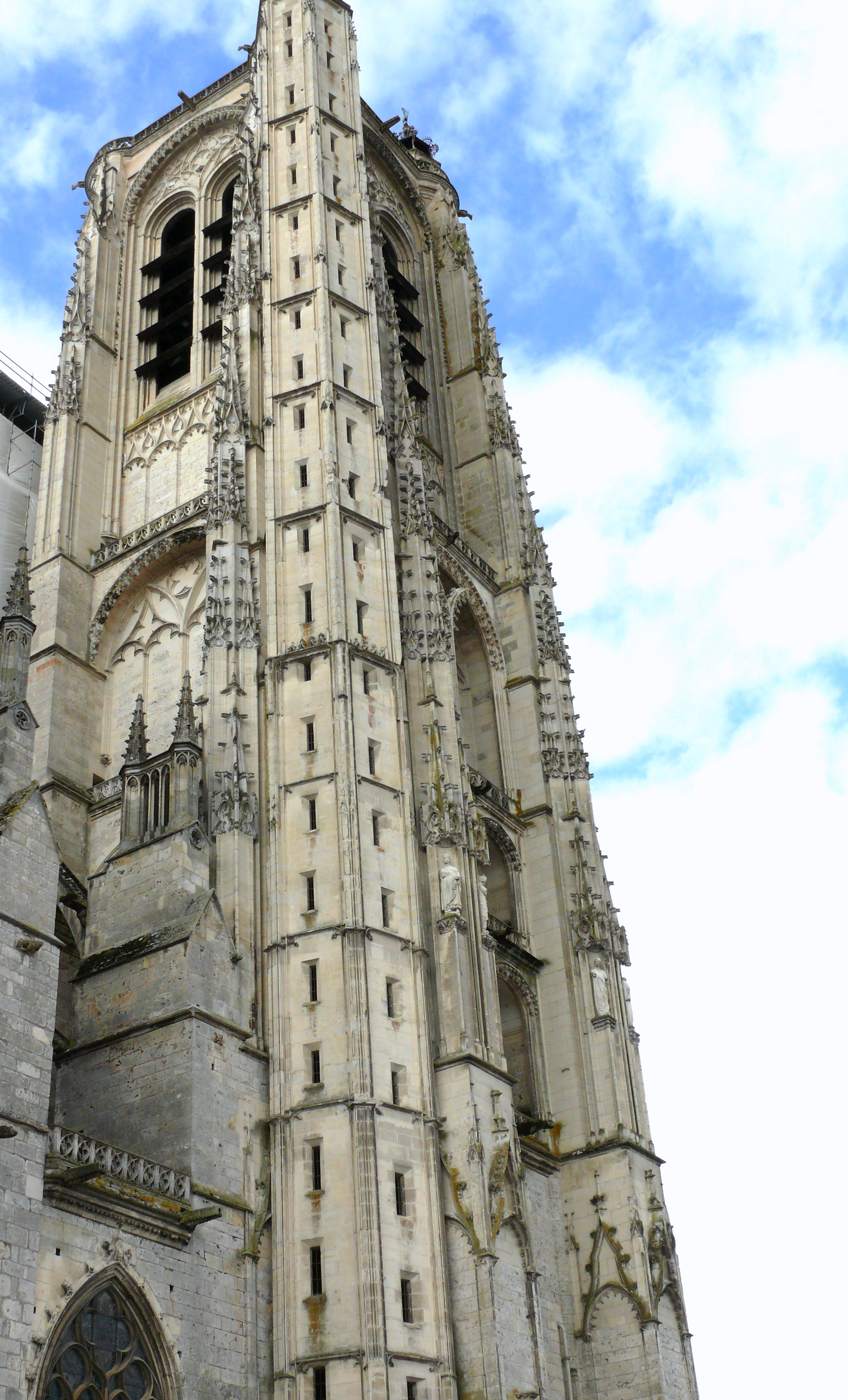
North tower of Bourges Cathedral (1508-1515)

Beyond northern France, churches were also enlarged and updated with additions in the Flamboyant style. Due to its size and decoration, the abbey-church of Saint-Antoine in Saint-Antoine-l'Abbaye (Auvergne-Rhône-Alpes) is one of the most significant examples of Gothic architecture in southeastern France. The five-aisled abbey-church was a key pilgrimage site in the Middle Ages because it contained the relics of Saint Anthony the Great, which were especially sought out by those who were suffering from "Saint Anthony's Fire" (ergot poisoning). Royal figures including Sigismund, Holy Roman Emperor (1415), Louis XI of France (1475), and Anne of Brittany (1494) also visited the abbey-church. The building's most prominent architectural feature is its monumental west façade, which was completed in the Flamboyant style in the 15th century. The façade has a central portal flanked by secondary portals and a large lancet window with curvilinear tracery that includes triskelions. Additional ornamentation in the form of naturalistic vegetation, gables, pinnacles, and delicate sculpture niches are further testaments of the talents of the masons' workshop. Work on the façade stopped before it was completed; there is no evidence of the iron hooks that are needed to attach figural sculptures.

At Lyon Cathedral, the Bourbons chapel, built during the last decades of the 15th century by the Cardinal Charles II, Duke of Bourbon and his brother Pierre de Bourbon, son-in-law of Louis XI, is a key example of the trend of expanding existing Gothic churches in the newer Flamboyant style. Consisting of two bays, it features a small oratory and a sacristy. The pendant vaults are decorated with finely carved keystones. The mouldings of the transverse ribs are decorated with the monograms of Charles de Bourbon, Pierre de Bourbon, and his wife, Anne of France.

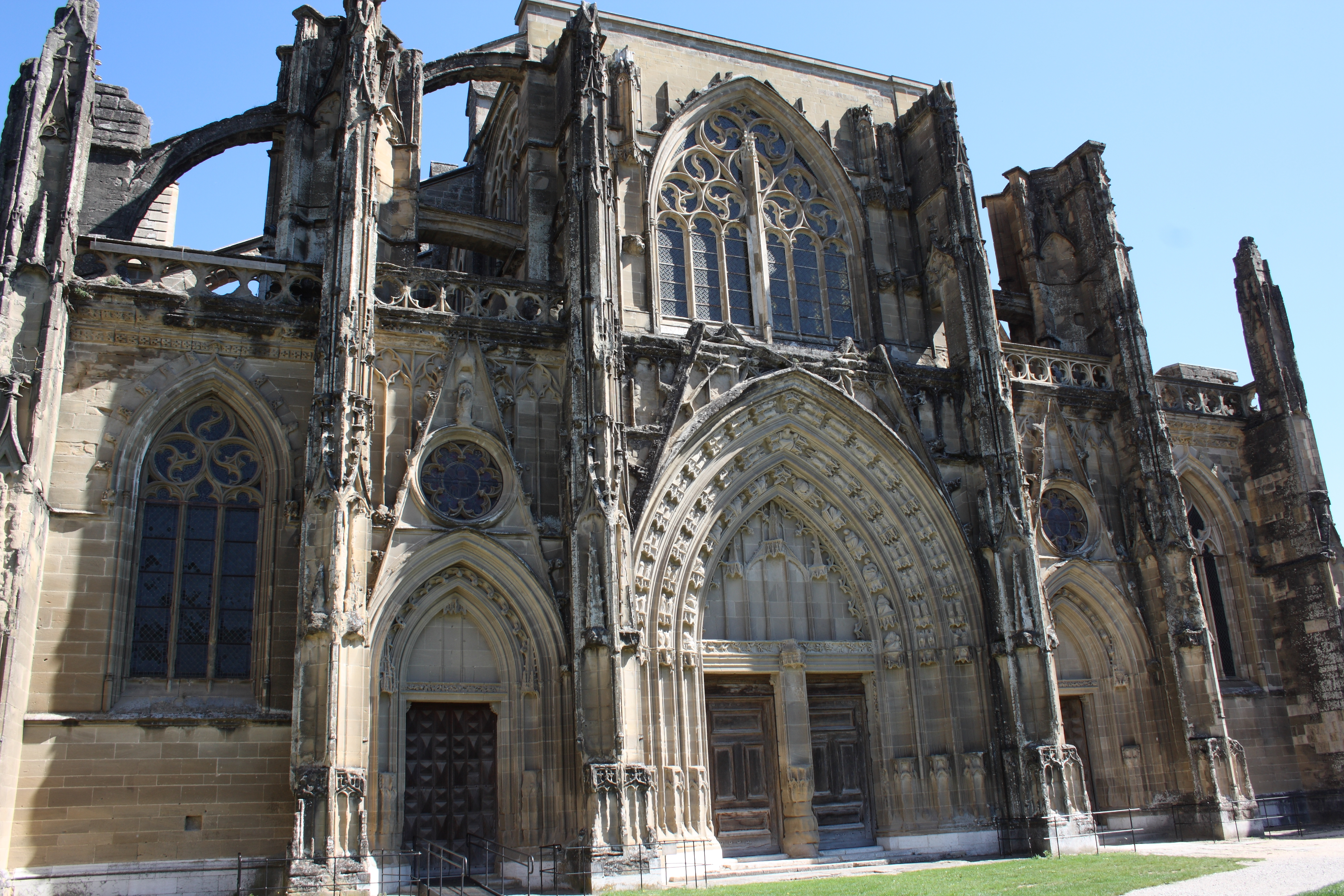
West façade, Abbey-church of Saint-Antoine, Saint-Antoine-l'Abbaye (15th century)

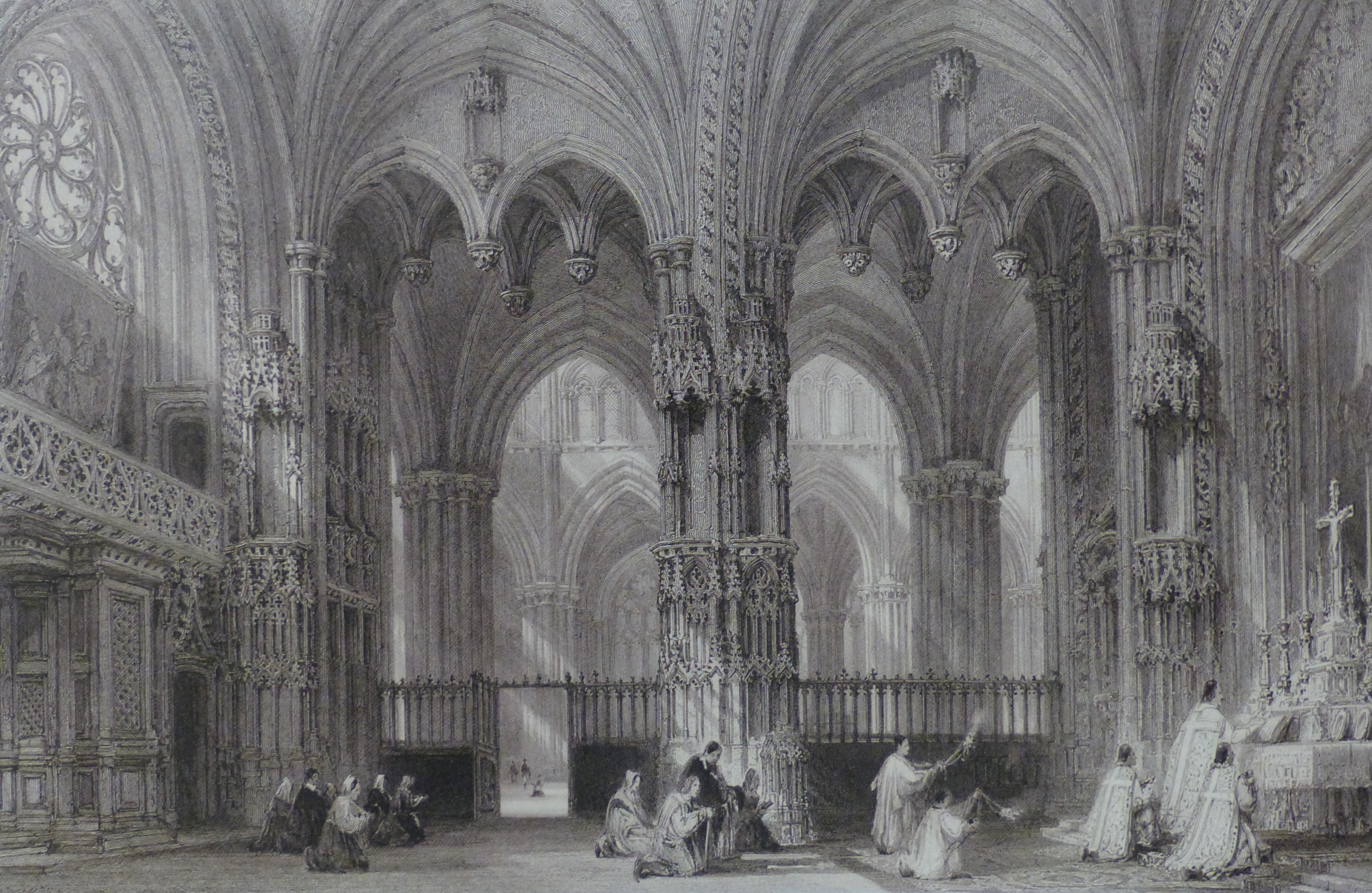
Bourbons chapel, Lyon Cathedral, engraving by Ebenezer Challis after a drawing by Thomas Allom (19th century)

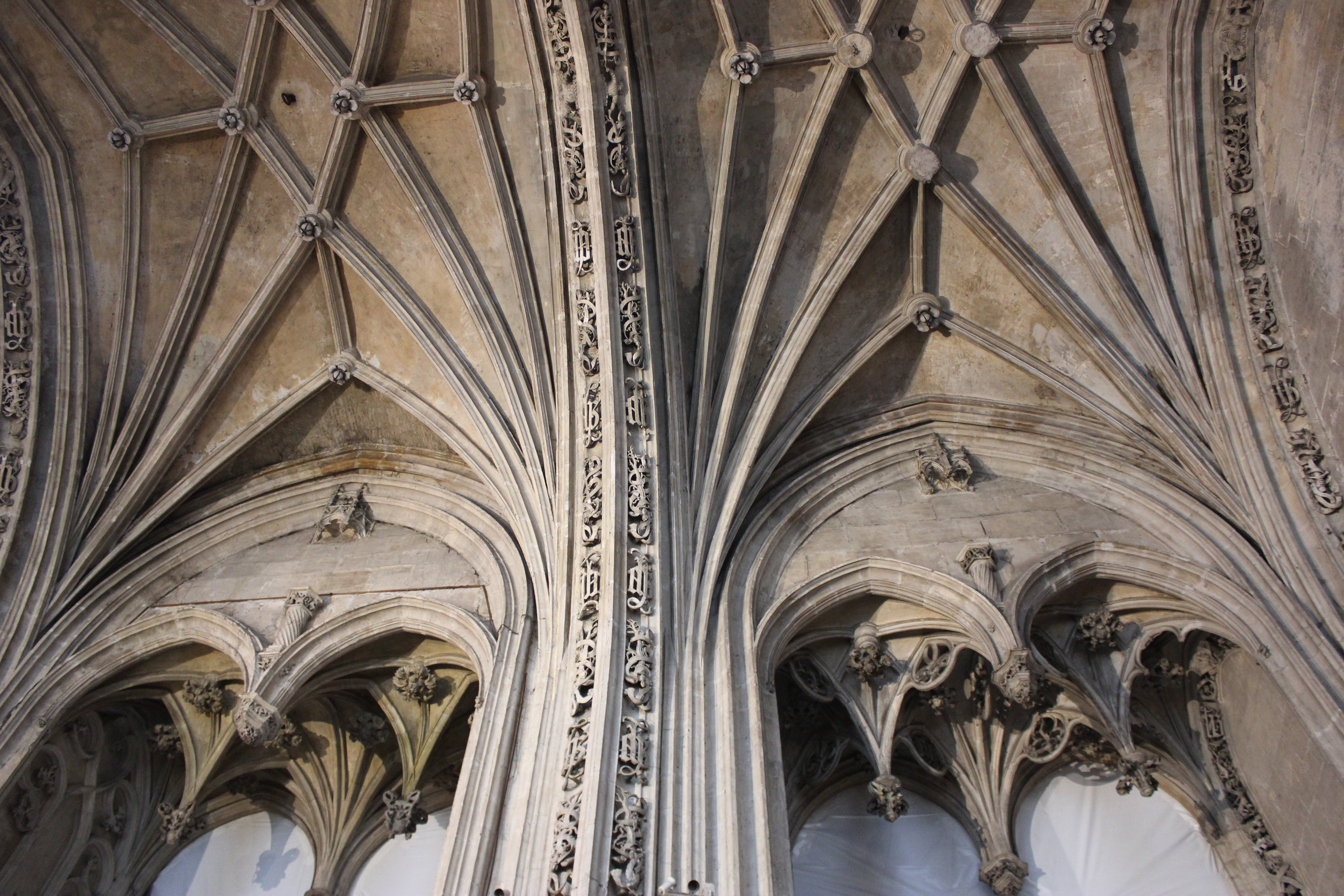
Pendant vaults and mouldings with monograms, Bourbons chapel, Lyon Cathedral (late 15th century)

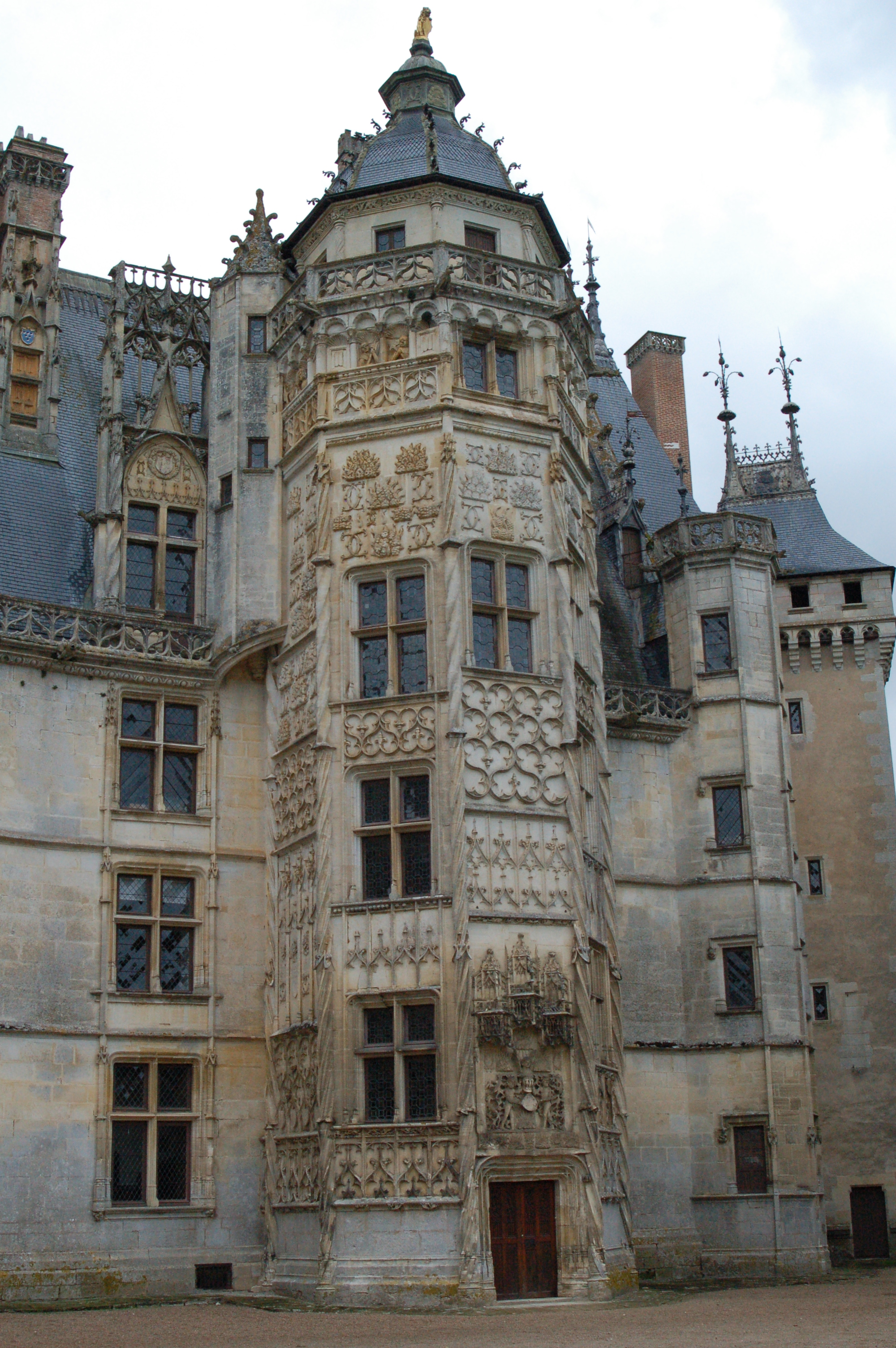
Helical staircase tower with Flamboyant Gothic and classicizing decoration, Château de Meillant (1510)

=== Transition between Flamboyant Gothic and Renaissance (1495–1530) ===
The transition from Flamboyant Gothic to early French Renaissance began during the reign of Louis XII (1495) and lasted until roughly 1525 or 1530. During this brief transition period, the ogee arch and the naturalism of the Gothic style was blended with round arches, flexible forms, and stylized antique motifs that are typical of Renaissance architecture. A good deal of Gothic decoration is apparent at the Château de Blois but it is totally absent from the tomb of Louis XII, which is housed in the abbey-church of Saint-Denis.

In 1495, a colony of Italian artists was established in Amboise and worked in collaboration with French master masons. This date is generally considered to be the starting point of the period of interaction between the Flamboyant Gothic and early French Renaissance styles. In general, theories of building design and structure remained French while surface decoration became Italian. There were connections between French architectural production and other stylistic traditions, including Plateresque in Spain and the decorative arts of the north—especially Antwerp.

The limits of this style, which is called style Louis XII in French, were variable, especially outside the Loire Valley. This period includes the seventeen-year reign of Louis XII (1498–1515), the end of the reign of Charles VIII, and the beginning of that of Francis I, whose rule corresponded with a definitive stylistic change. The creation of the School of Fontainebleau in 1530 by Francis I is generally considered the turning point of the acceptance and establishment of the Renaissance style in France. Early evidence of the intermingling of Flamboyant and classicizing decorative motifs can be found at the Château de Meillant, which was transformed by Charles II d'Amboise, governor of Milan, in 1473. The structure remained fully medieval but the superposition of the windows in bays connected to each other by extended, cord-like pinnacles foreshadows the grid designs of the façades of early French Renaissance monuments. Other notable features include the entablature with classical egg-and-dart motifs surmounted by a Gothic balustrade and the treatment of the upper part of the helical staircase with a semi-circular arcade equipped with shells. In the final years of the reign of Charles VIII, experimentation with Italian ornamentation continued to enrich and mix with the Flamboyant repertoire. With the ascendancy of Louis XII, French masons and sculptors were further exposed to new, classicizing motifs that were popular in Italy.

In architectural sculpture, the systematic contribution of Italian elements and the "Gothic" reinterpretation of Italian Renaissance works is evident in the Abbey of Saint-Pierre in Solesmes, where the Gothic structure takes the form of a Roman triumphal arch flanked by pilasters with Lombard candelabra. Gothic foliage, which was now more jagged and wilted as seen at the Hôtel de Cluny in Paris, mingles with portraits of Roman emperors in medallions at the Château de Gaillon. The maison des Têtes (1528–1532) in Valence is another example of Flamboyant blind tracery and foliage mixing with classicizing figures, medallions, and portraits of Roman emperors.

In architecture, the use of brick and stone on buildings from the 16th century can be observed, for example in the Louis XII wing of the Château of Blois. The French high roofs with turrets in the corners and the façades with helical staircases perpetuated the Gothic tradition but the systematic superposition of the bays, the removal of the lucarnes, and the appearance of loggias influenced by the villa Poggio Reale and the Castel Nuovo of Naples are evidence of a new decorative art in which the structure remains deeply Gothic. The spread of ornamental vocabularies from Pavia and Milan also played major roles. Equally important is the influence of Italian architects who designed formal gardens and fountains to complement French monuments as seen at the Château de Blois (1499) and the Château de Gaillon shortly thereafter.

The incorporation of Flamboyant Gothic with the classicizing forms of Italy produced eclectic, hybrid structures that were rooted in traditional French building practices yet modernized through the application of imported antique motifs and surface decoration. These transitional monuments led to the birth of French Renaissance architecture.

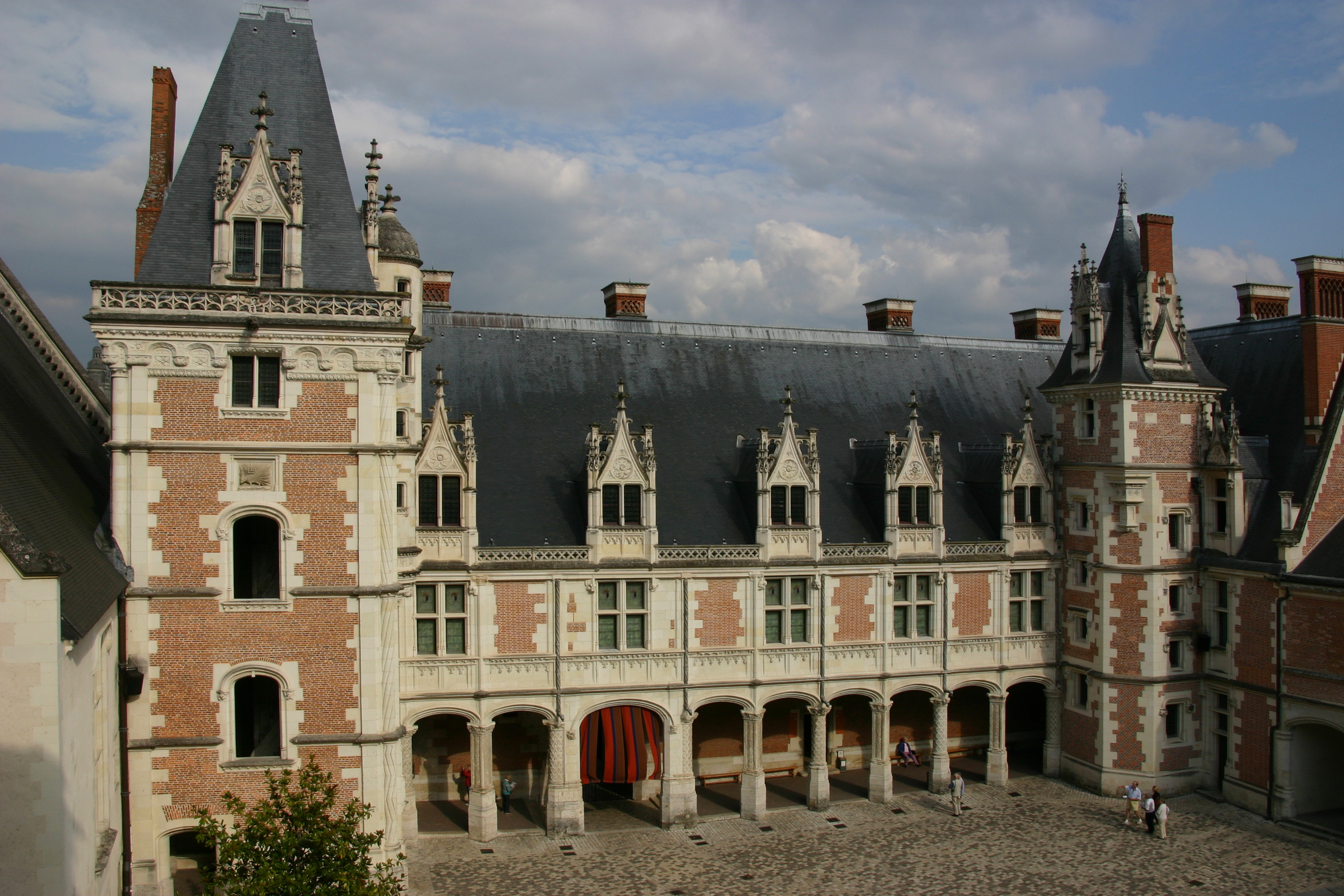
Louis XII wing of the Château de Blois (1498–1503)

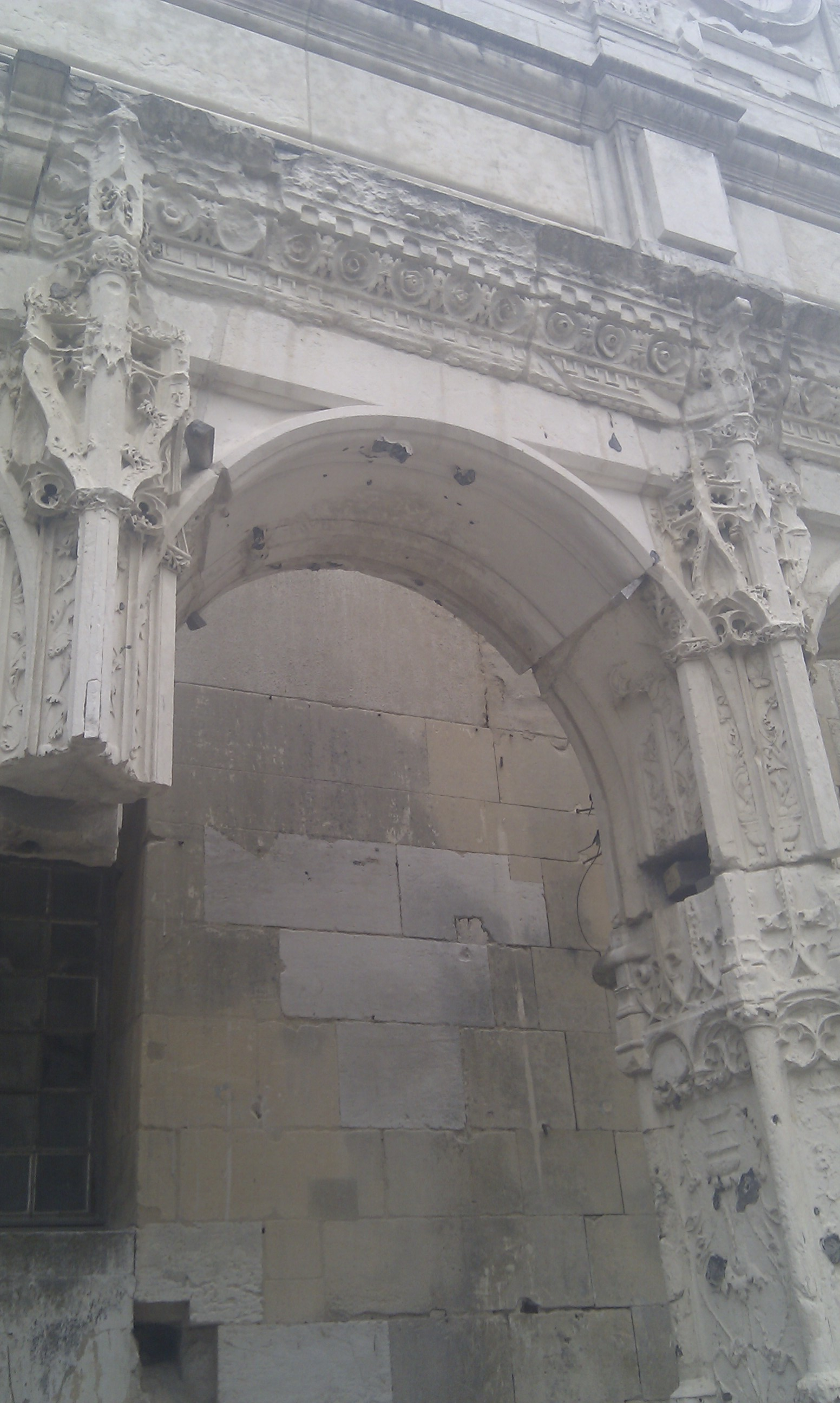
Fusion of Flamboyant Gothic and Renaissance exterior decoration at Château de Gaillon (1502–1510)

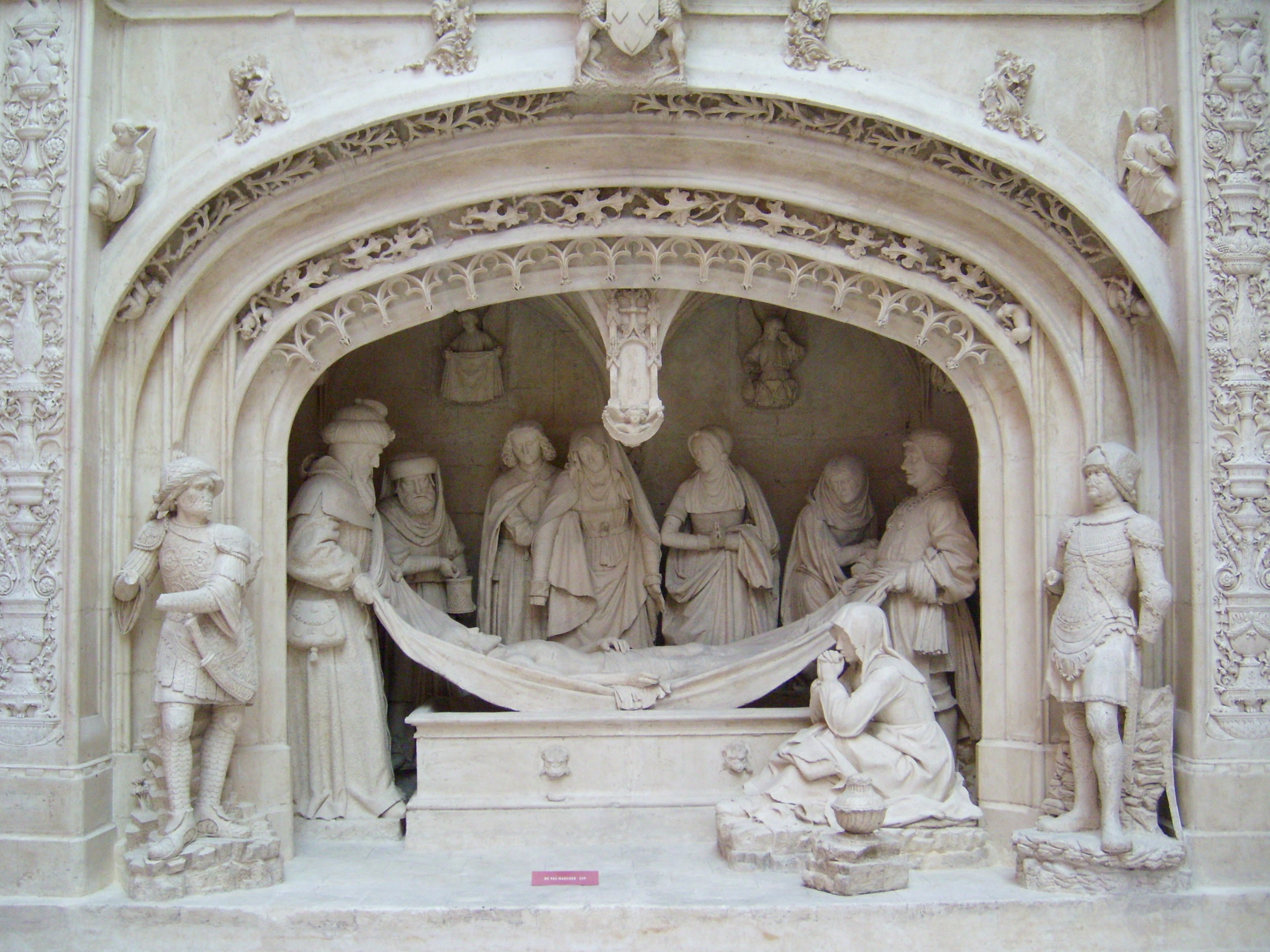
Burial of Christ, Solesmes Abbey (1496)

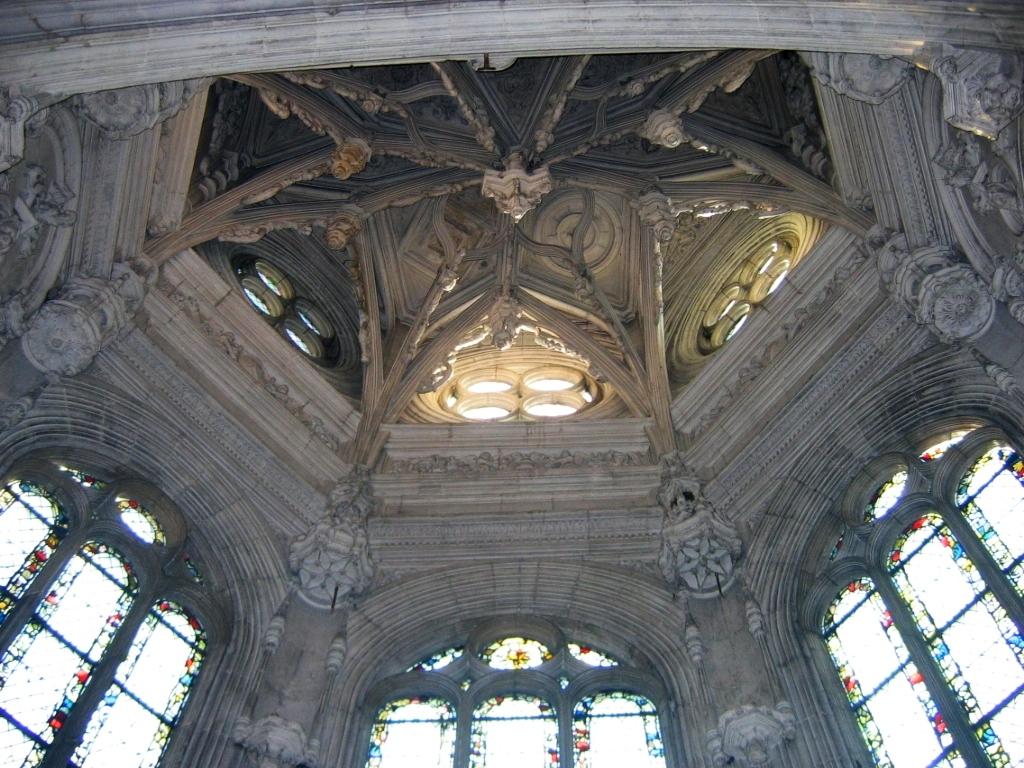
Chapel vault with classicizing decoration, church of Saint-Pierre, Caen, by Hector Sohier (1518–1545)

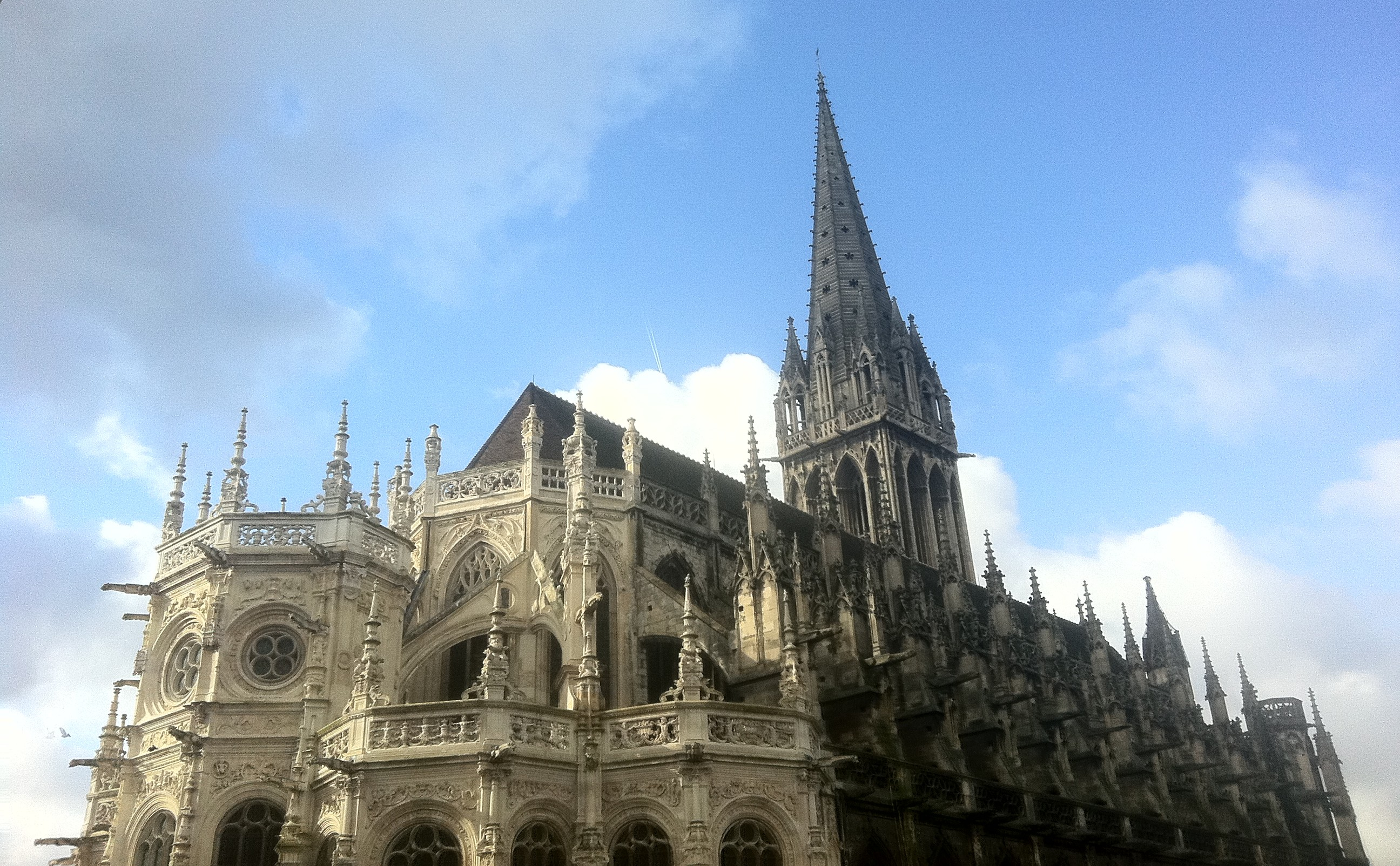
Southeast side of the church of Saint-Pierre, Caen, showing combinations of Flamboyant Gothic and antique forms

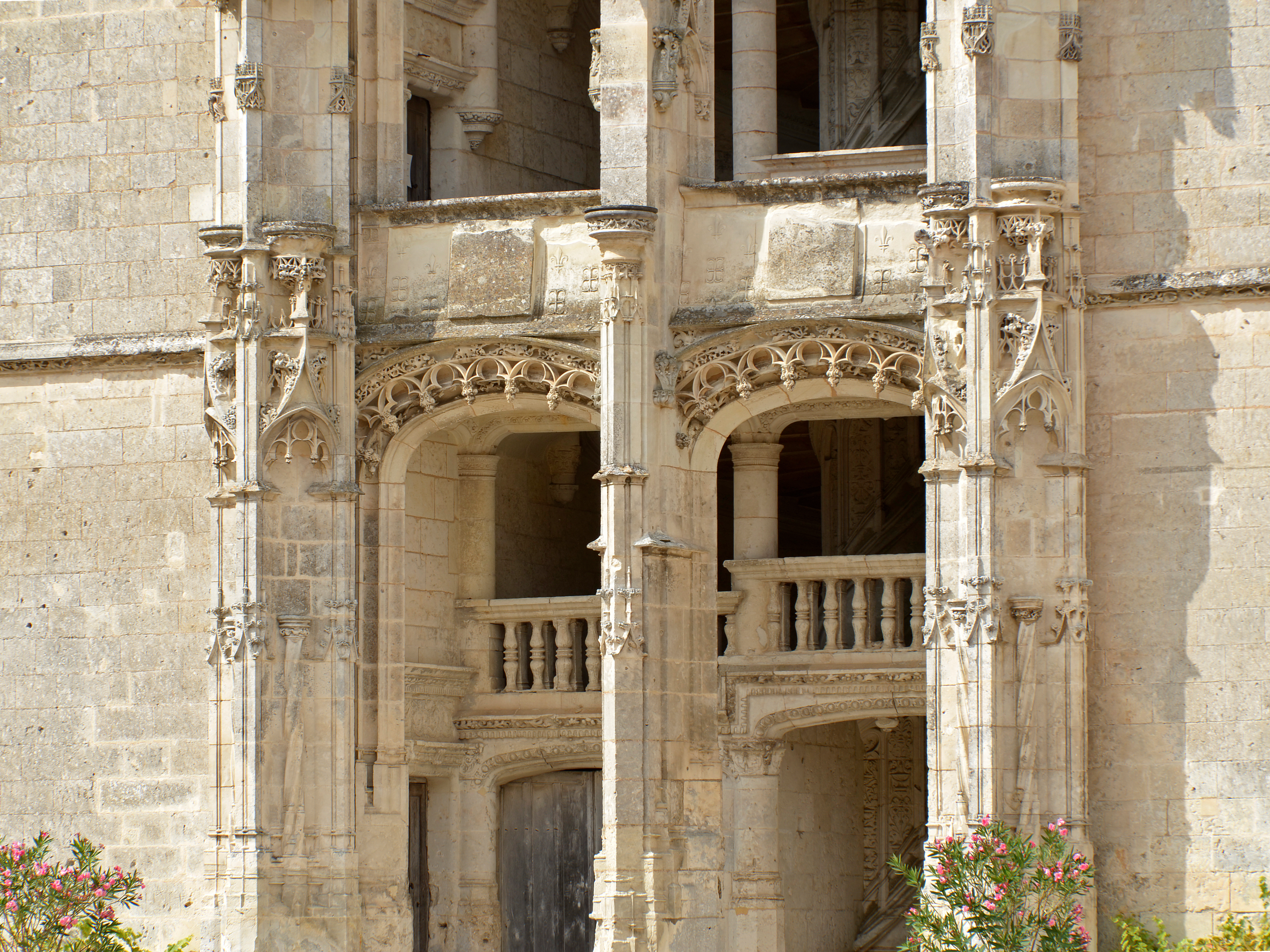
The Longueville staircase, Château de Châteaudun, showing juxtaposition of Flamboyant Gothic and antique decoration

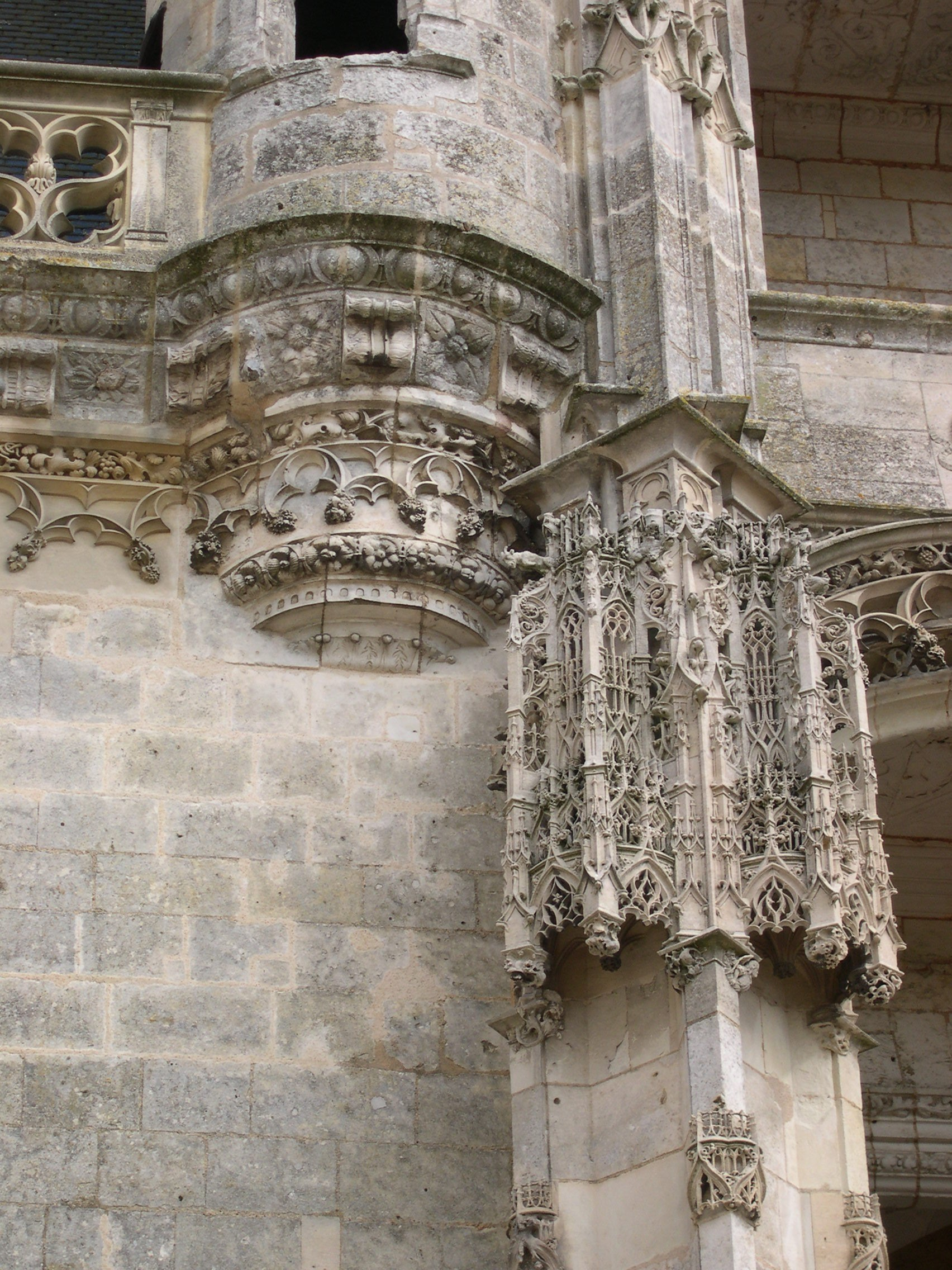
Detail of the Longueville staircase, Château de Châteaudun, showing juxtaposition of Flamboyant Gothic and antique decoration

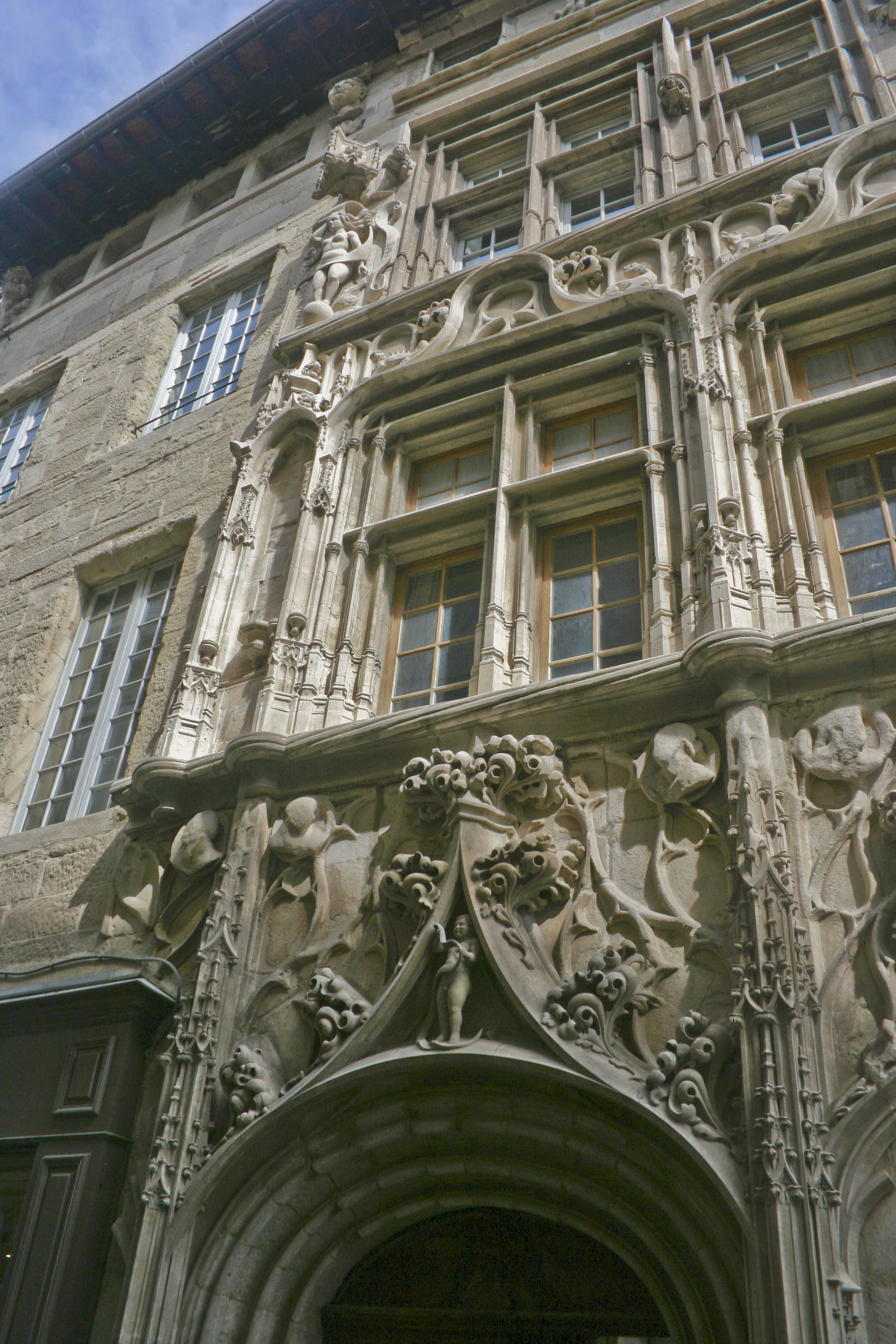
Maison des Têtes (1528–1532), Valence

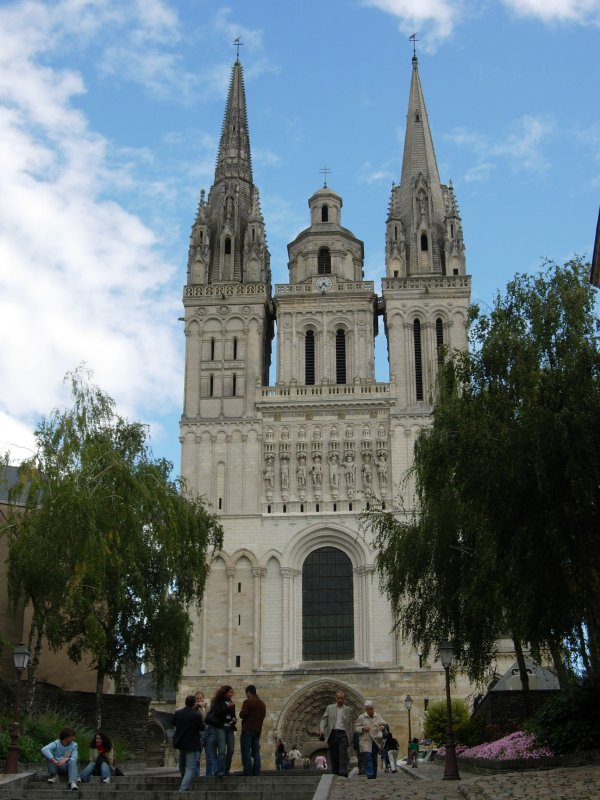
Angers Cathedral, a Renaissance lantern atop the Flamboyant Gothic central tower (finished 1515)

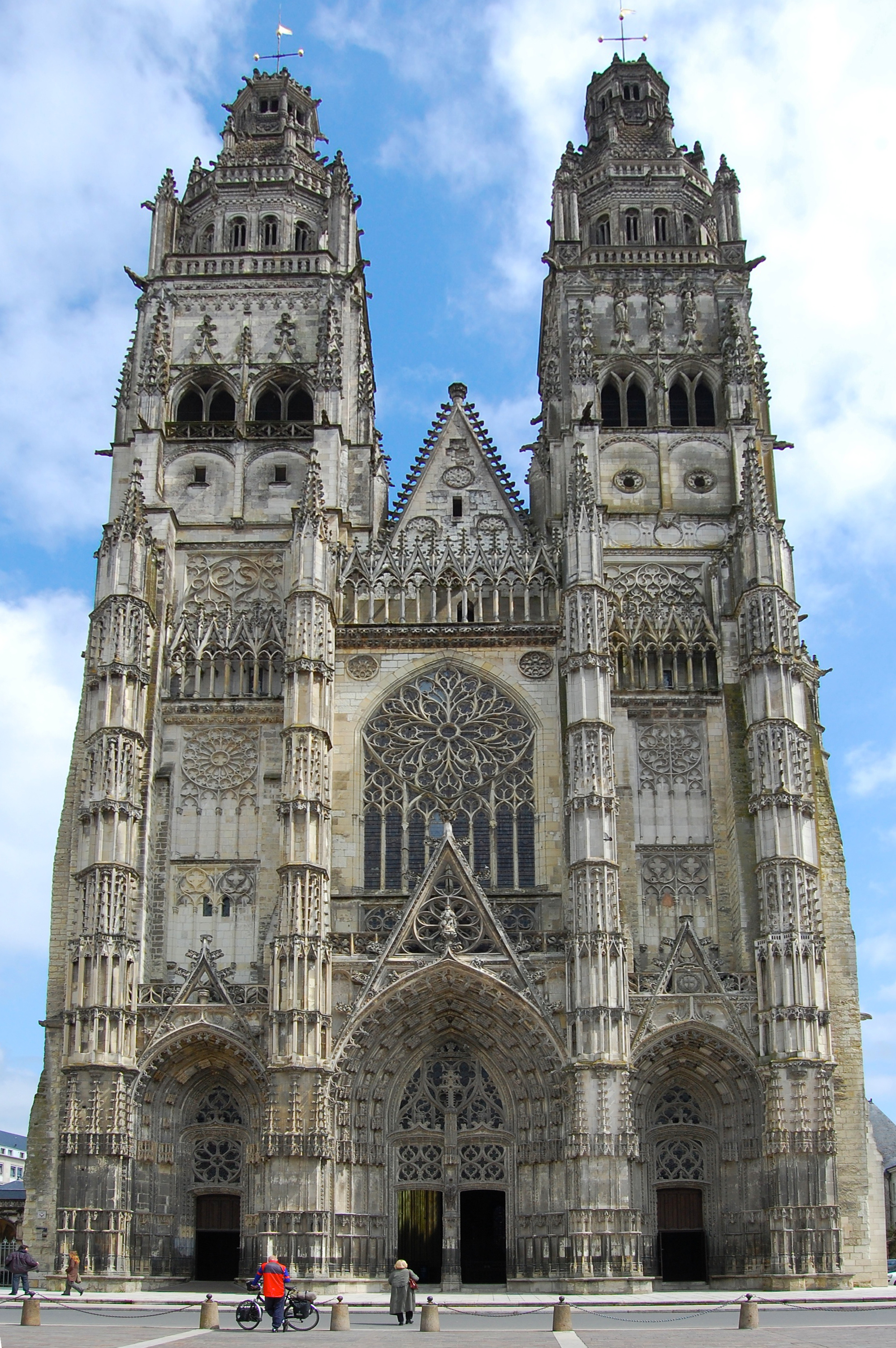
Tours Cathedral (finished 1507) with Renaissance lanterns atop the flamboyant towers

== Low Countries ==
Variations of Flamboyant, influenced by France but with their own characteristics, began to appear in other parts of continental Europe. Flamboyant had a particularly strong influence in Low Countries, which was then part of the Spanish Netherlands and was also a part of the Catholic diocese of Cologne. Extraordinarily high towers were a feature of the Belgian style. In the 15th century, Belgian architects produced remarkable examples of religious and secular Flamboyant architecture, one of which is the tower of St. Rumbold's Cathedral in Mechelen (1452–1520), which was built as both a bell tower and a watch tower for the defence of the city. The tower was intended to be 167 metres (548 ft) high and was designed to have a 77-metre-high (253 ft) spire, only 7 metres (23 ft) of which was completed. Other notable Flamboyant cathedrals include Antwerp Cathedral with a 123-metre-high (404 ft) tower and an unusual dome on pendentives that is decorated with a Flamboyant rib vault; St. John's Cathedral ('s-Hertogenbosch) in 's-Hertogenbosch (1220–1530), the Cathedral of St. Michael and St. Gudula in Brussels (1485–1519); and Liege Cathedral.

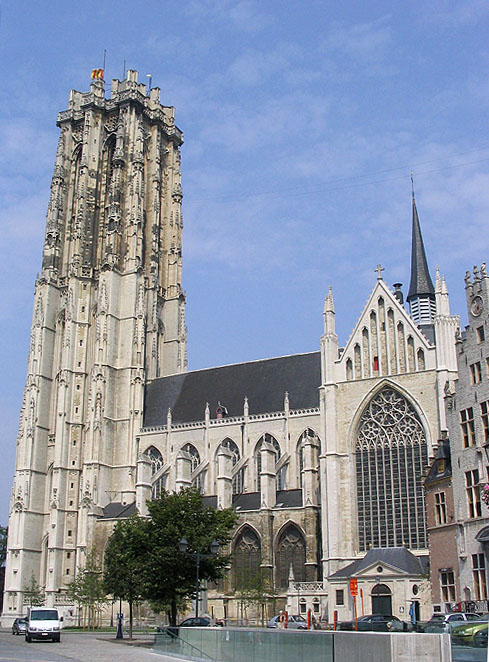
Tower of St Rumbold's Cathedral in Mechelen (1452–1520)

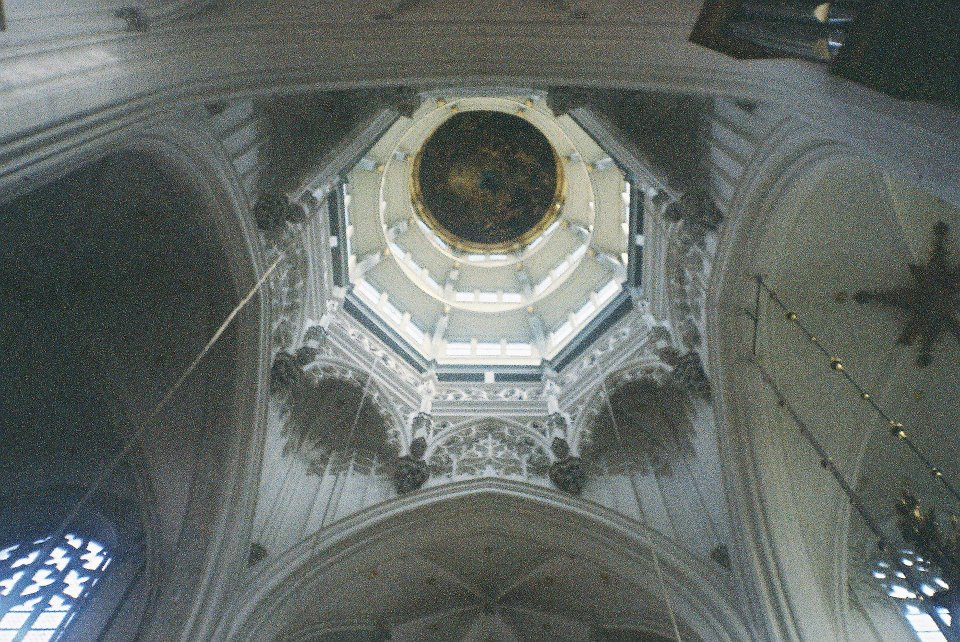
Lantern tower, Antwerp Cathedral, consecrated 1521

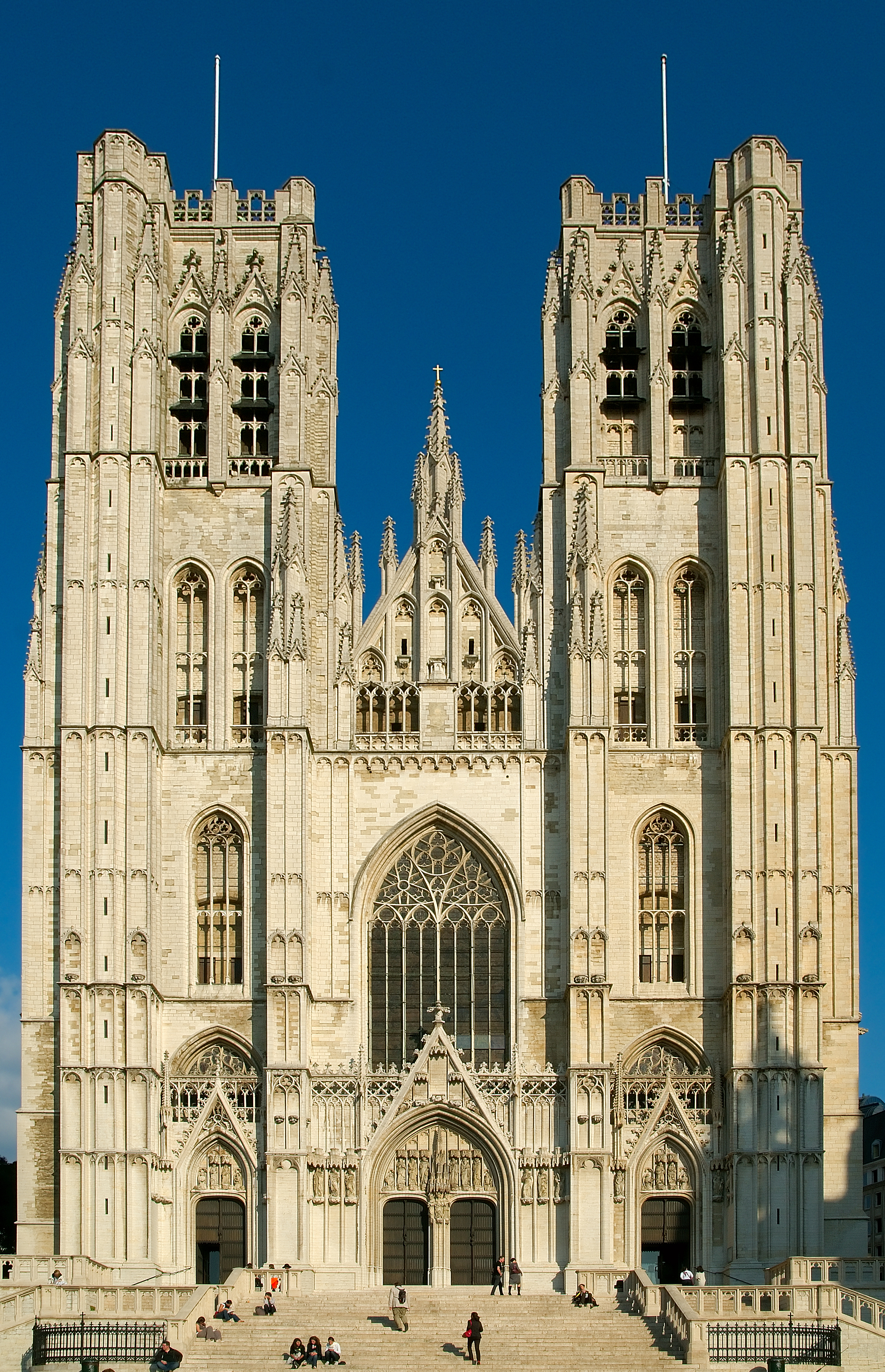
Cathedral of St Michael and St Gudula, Brussels (1485–1519)

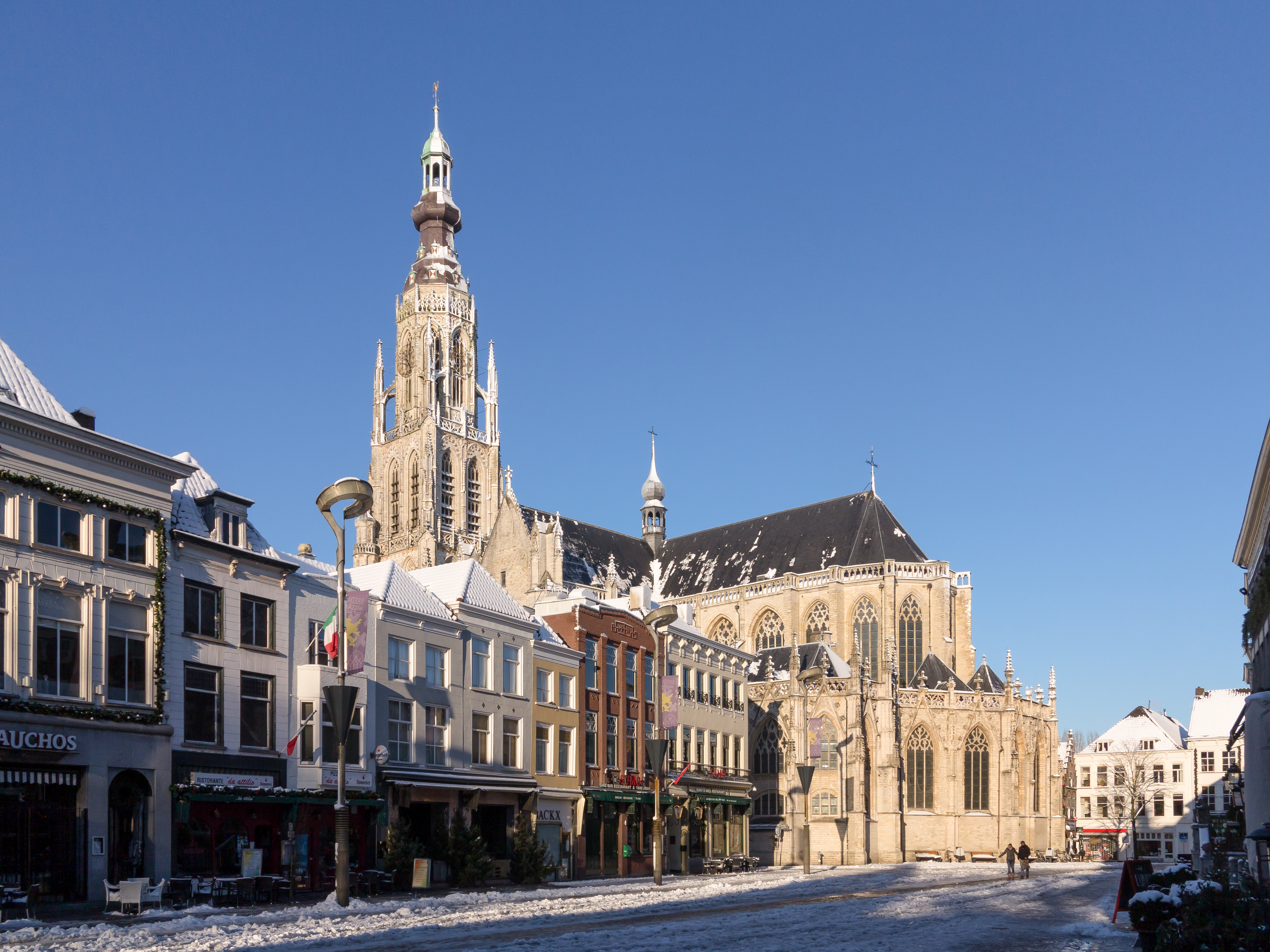
Grote Kerk, Breda (1410–1547)

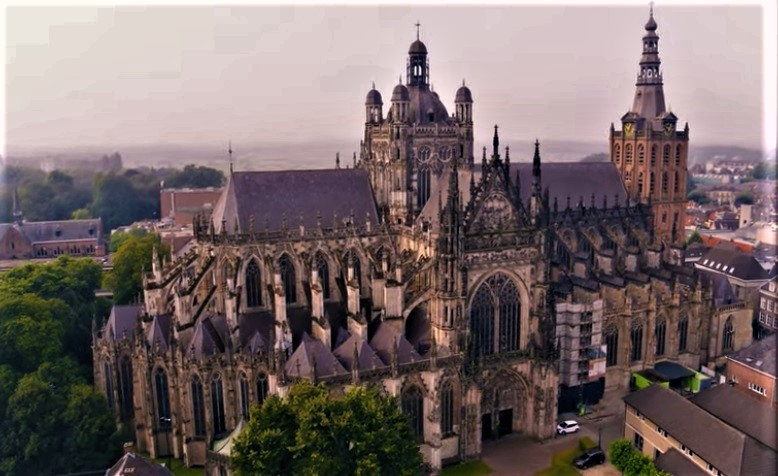
St. John's Cathedral, 's-Hertogenbosch (1220–1530)

The town halls of Belgium, many of which were built by the prosperous textile merchants of Flanders, were even more flamboyant. They were among the last great statements of Gothic style as the Renaissance gradually came to Northern Europe, and were designed to showcase the wealth and splendour of their cities. Major examples include the town hall of Leuven (1448–1469) with its multiple, almost fantastic towers, and those of Brussels (1401–1455), Oudenaarde (1526–1536), Ghent (1519–1539), and Mons (1458–1477).

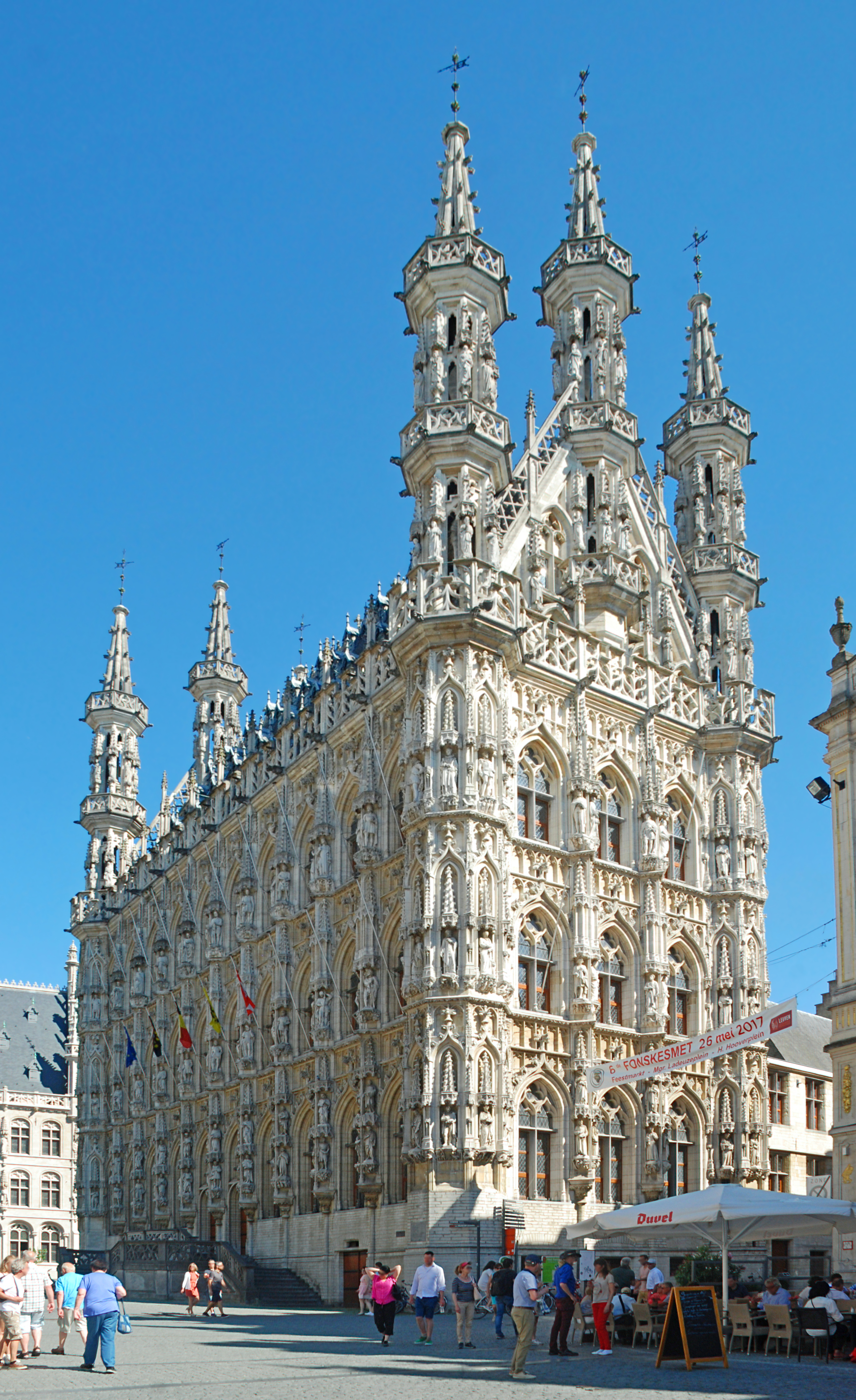
Leuven's Town Hall (1448–1469)

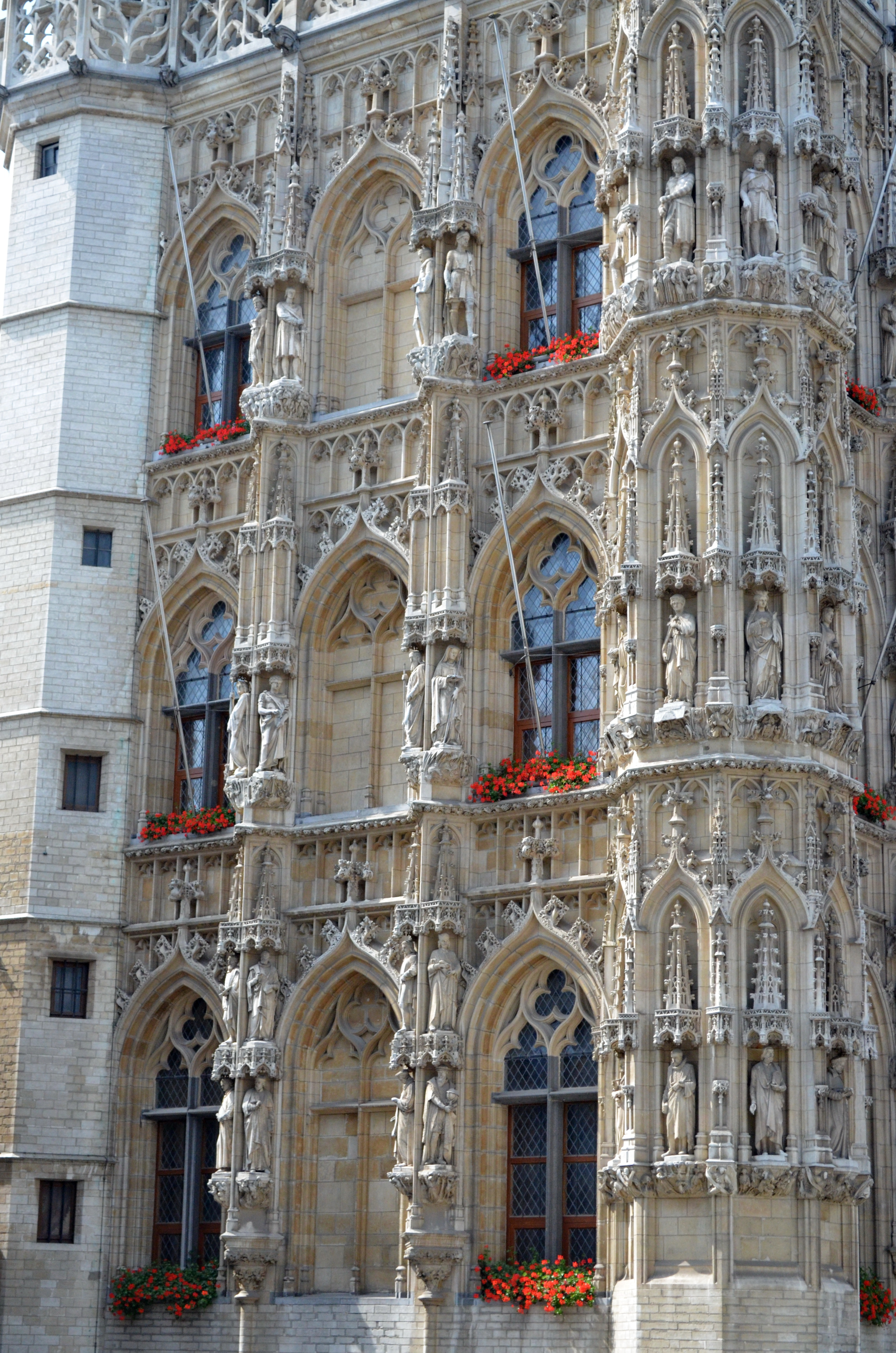
Detail of the façade of Leuven's Town Hall

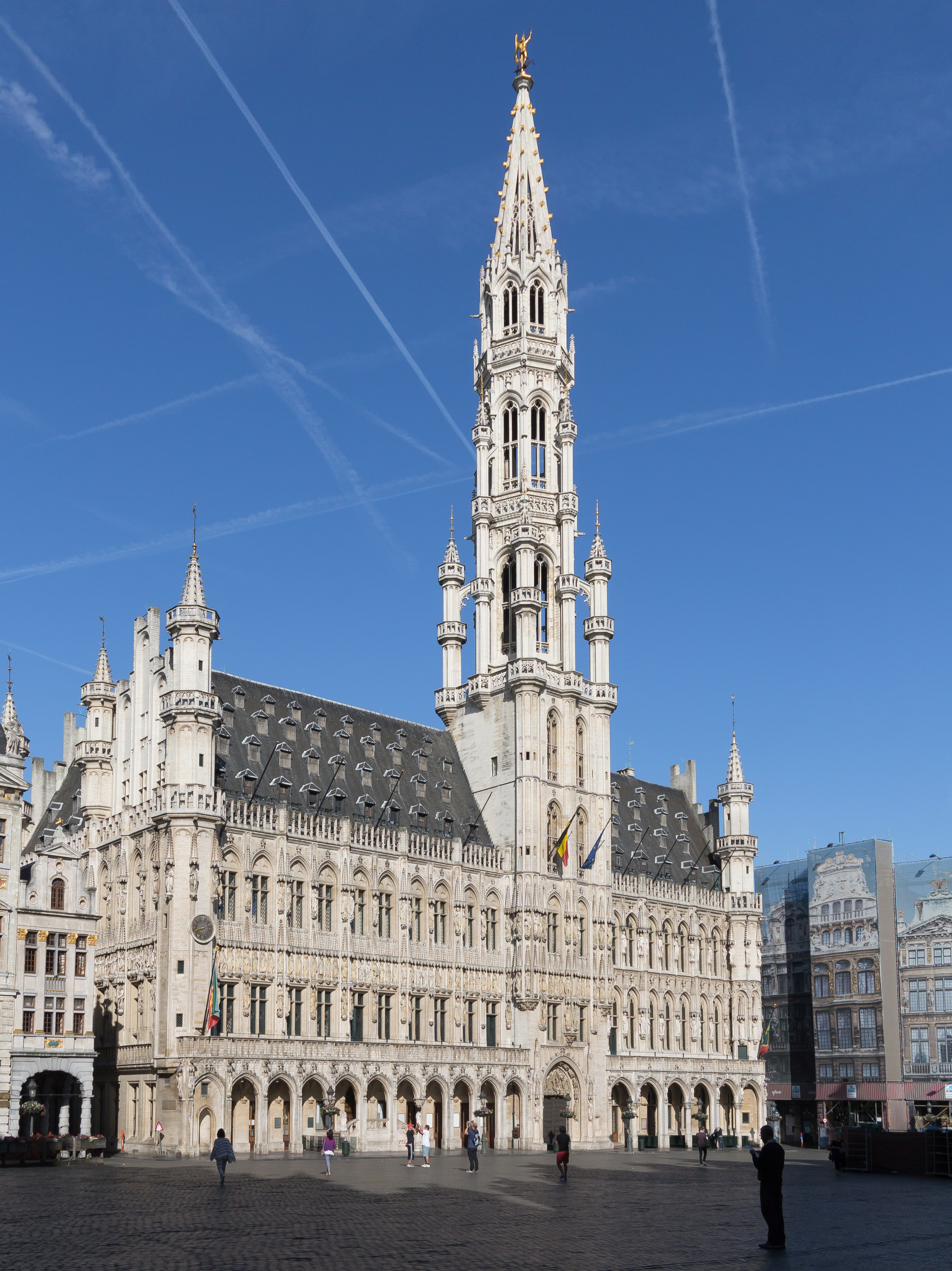
Brussels' Town Hall (1401–1455)

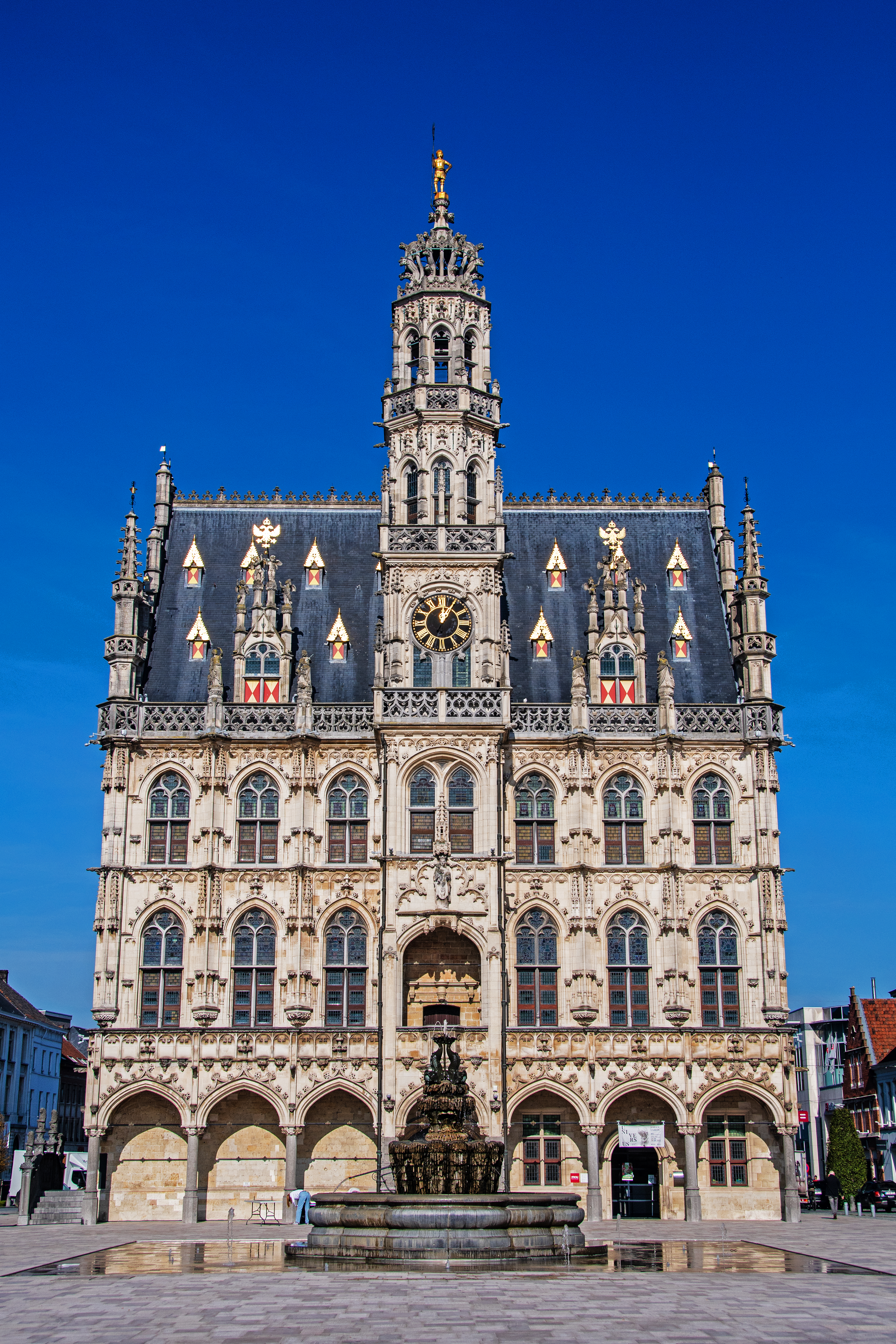
Oudenaarde's Town Hall (1526–1536)

=== Adaptations in Holland and of Zeeland ===
Many churches in the former Counties of Holland and of Zeeland are built in a style sometimes inaccurately separated as Hollandic and as Zeelandic Gothic. These are in fact Brabantine Gothic style buildings with concessions necessitated by local conditions. Thus (except for Dordrecht), because of the soggy ground, weight was saved by wooden barrel vaults instead of stone vaults and the flying buttresses required for those. In most cases, the walls were made of bricks but cut natural stone was not unusual.

Everaert Spoorwater played an important role in spreading Brabantine Gothic into Holland and Zeeland. He perfected a method by which the drawings for large constructions allowed ordering virtually all natural stone elements from quarries on later Belgian territory, then at the destination needing merely their cementing in place. This eliminated storage near the construction site, and the work could be done without the permanent presence of the architect.

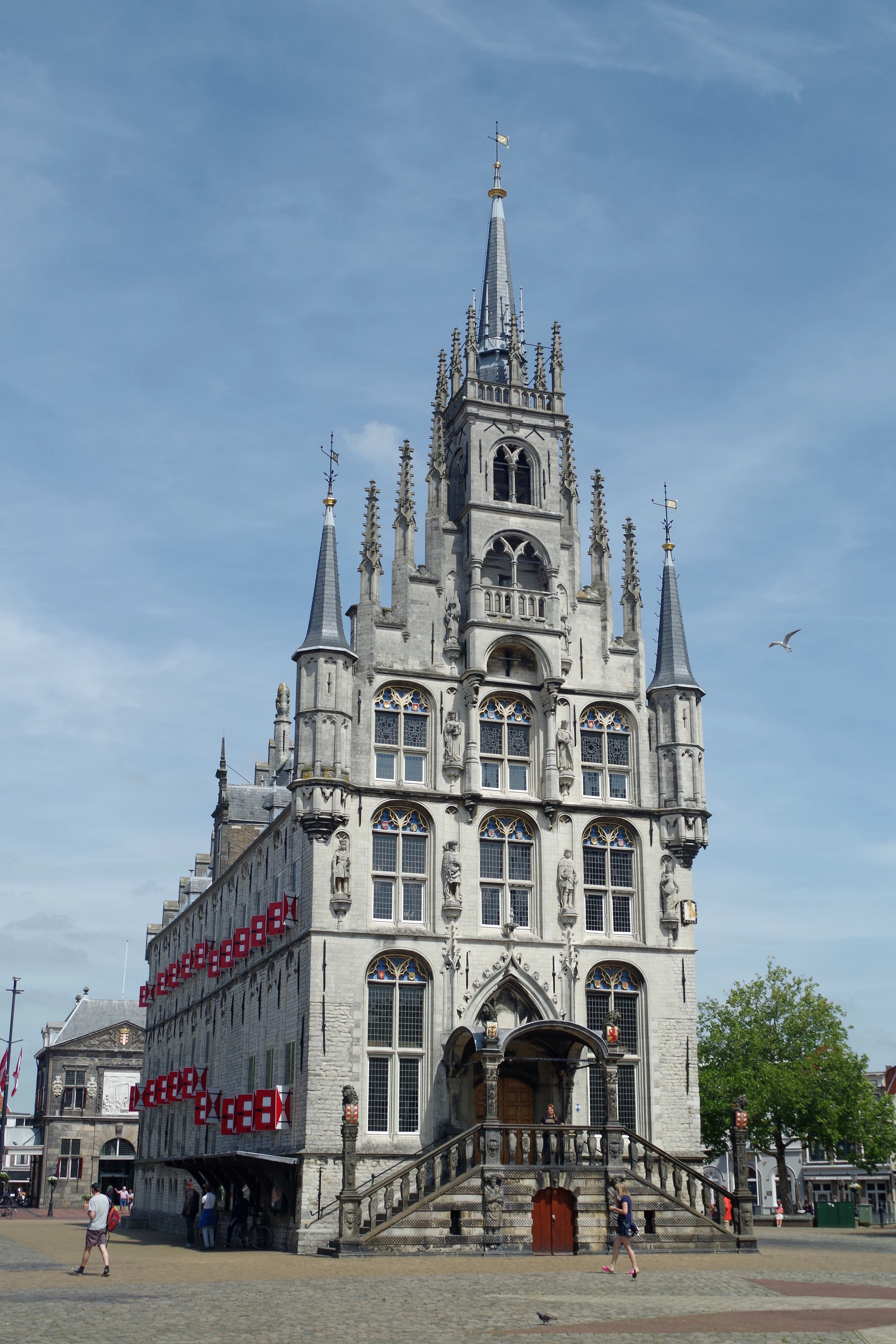
Gouda's Town Hall (1449–1459)

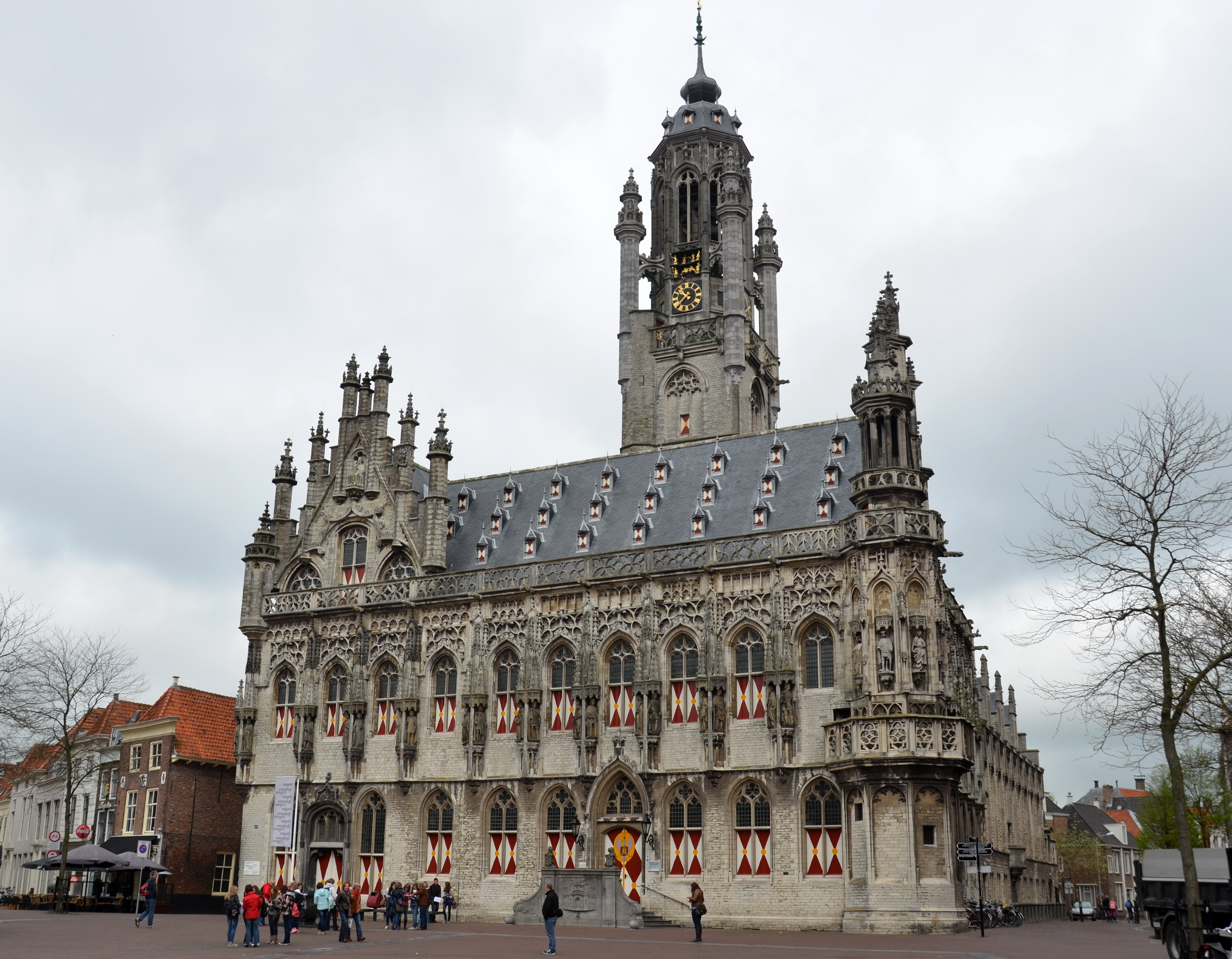
Middelburg's Town Hall (1452–1520)

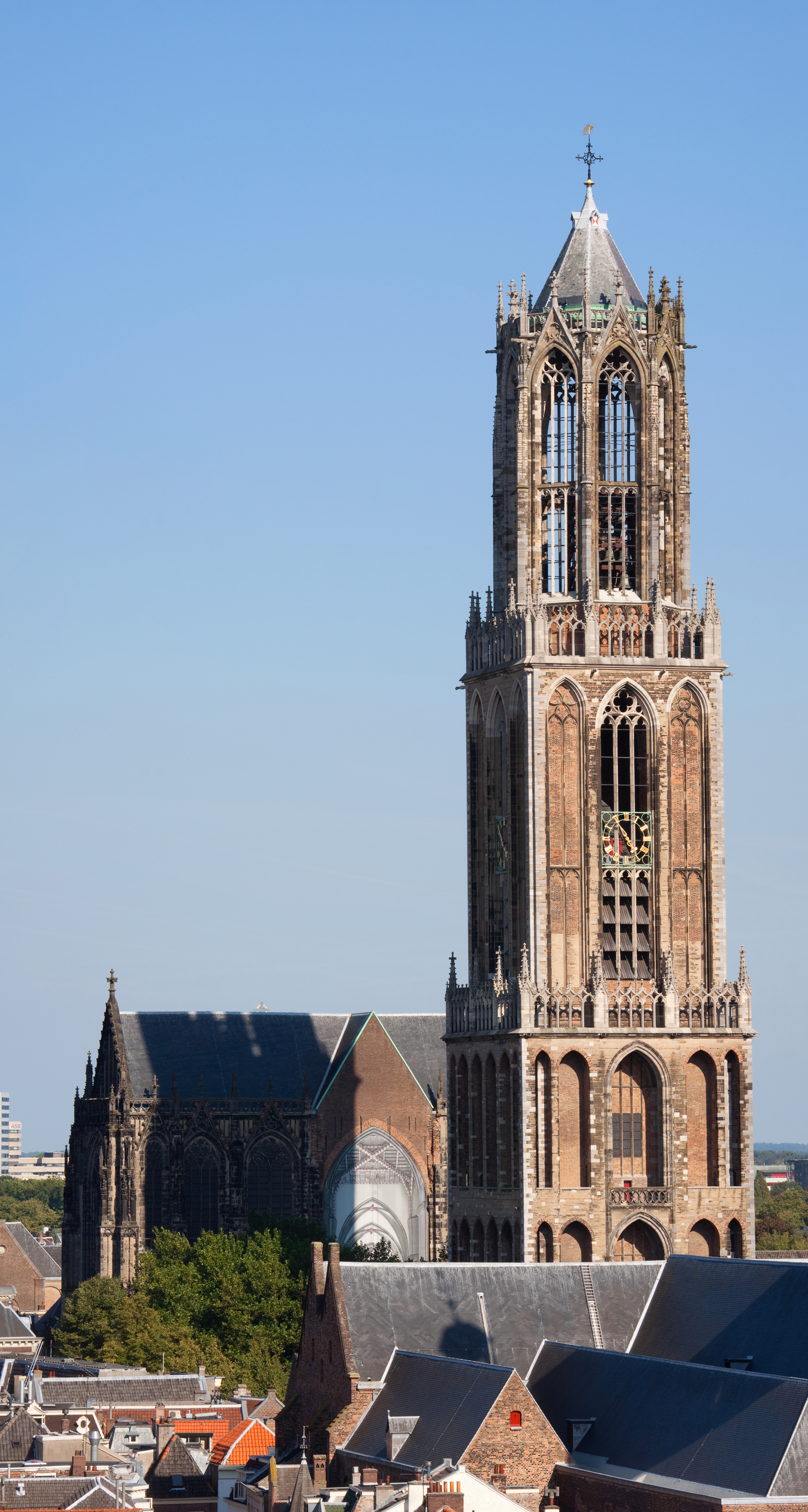
St. Martin's Cathedral, Utrecht in Utrecht

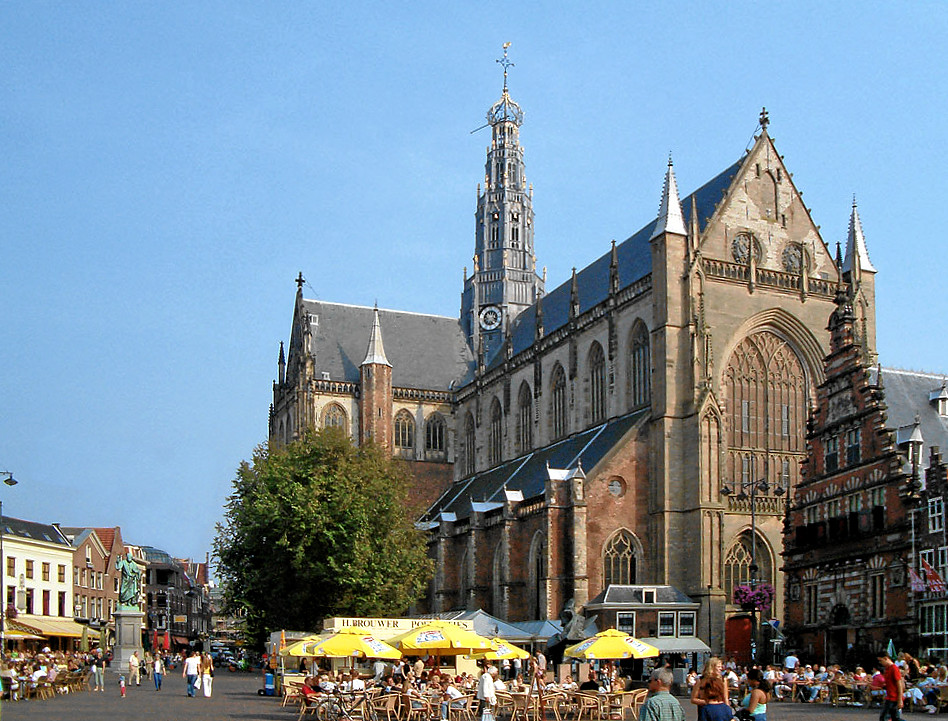
Grote Kerk in Haarlem

== Spain ==
Before the unification of Spain, monuments were constructed in the Flamboyant style in the Crown of Aragon and Kingdom of Valencia, where Marc Safont was among the most important architects of the Late Middle Ages. Safont was commissioned to repair the Palau de la Generalitat de Catalunya in Barcelona and worked on this project from 1410 to 1425. He designed the building's courtyard and elegant galleries. Also notable is the Chapel of Sant Jordi (1432–34), which has a striking façade consisting of an entry portal flanked by windows resplendent with blind and openwork Flamboyant tracery. The chapel's interior includes a lierne vault with a keystone depicting Saint George and the Dragon.

Following the 1428 Catalonia earthquake, a replacement Flamboyant rose window on the west façade of the church of Santa Maria del Mar, Barcelona, was completed by 1459. It is worth mentioning a few examples of civil buildings, in particular the trading floors(Lonjas) in Palma de Mallorca( 1420-1452) and Valencia(1482-1498) having a similar design with a columnar hall plan, the one in Valencia being more ambitious. The fine columns have a helicoidal design, characteristic of Iberian Gothic architecture. Other examples can be found in the church of Santiago in Villena, the Cistercian monastery of Secar de la Real in Palma, the church of Magdalena in Olivenza or the Palace of Montarco in Ciudad Rodrigo. Additional examples of the Flamboyant style in the Kingdom of Valencia include the cloister of the Convent of Sant Doménec, the dome of the cathedral of Valencia, or the reformed transept of the cathedral of Orihuela. In the kingdom of Castile, representative examples of civil Gothic architecture include the Infantado Palace in Guadalajara, the Casa de las Conchas in Salamanca or the castle of Manzanares el Real. There are a good number of fine cloisters built during the 15th century such us the ones in the cathedrals of Burgo de Osma, Sigüenza, Lérida(LLeida), Segovia, Oviedo, in monasteries like San Salvador in Oña, Santa Maria la Real in Nájera, Santa Maria de la Oliva in Carcastillo, or San Juan de los Reyes in Toledo, and in churches like Santo Domingo in Jerez de la Frontera, Santa Maria in Los Arcos (Navarra), San Miguel in Oñate or Santa Maria la Real in Sasamón.

Spain was united by the marriage of Ferdinand of Aragon and Isabella of Castile in 1469, and saw the conquest of Granada, the last stronghold of Moorish occupation, in 1492. This was followed by a great wave of construction of new cathedrals and churches in what became known as the Isabelline style after the queen. This late Spanish Gothic style includes a mixture of French-inspired Flamboyant tracery and vaulting features, Flemish features such as fringed arches, and elements that may have been borrowed from Islamic architecture, such as the crossed rib vaults and pierced openwork tracery of Burgos Cathedral. To this, Spanish architects such as Juan Guas added distinctive new features, for example in the Monastery of San Juan de los Reyes in Toledo (1488–1496) and the Colegio de San Gregorio (completed 1487). The rose window on the west façade of Toledo Cathedral (late 15th century) is a good example.

Juan de Colonia and his son Simón de Colonia, originally from Cologne, are other notable architects of the Isabelline style; they were the chief architects of the flamboyant features of Burgos Cathedral (1440–1481), including the openwork towers and the tracery in the star vault in the Chapel of the Constable.

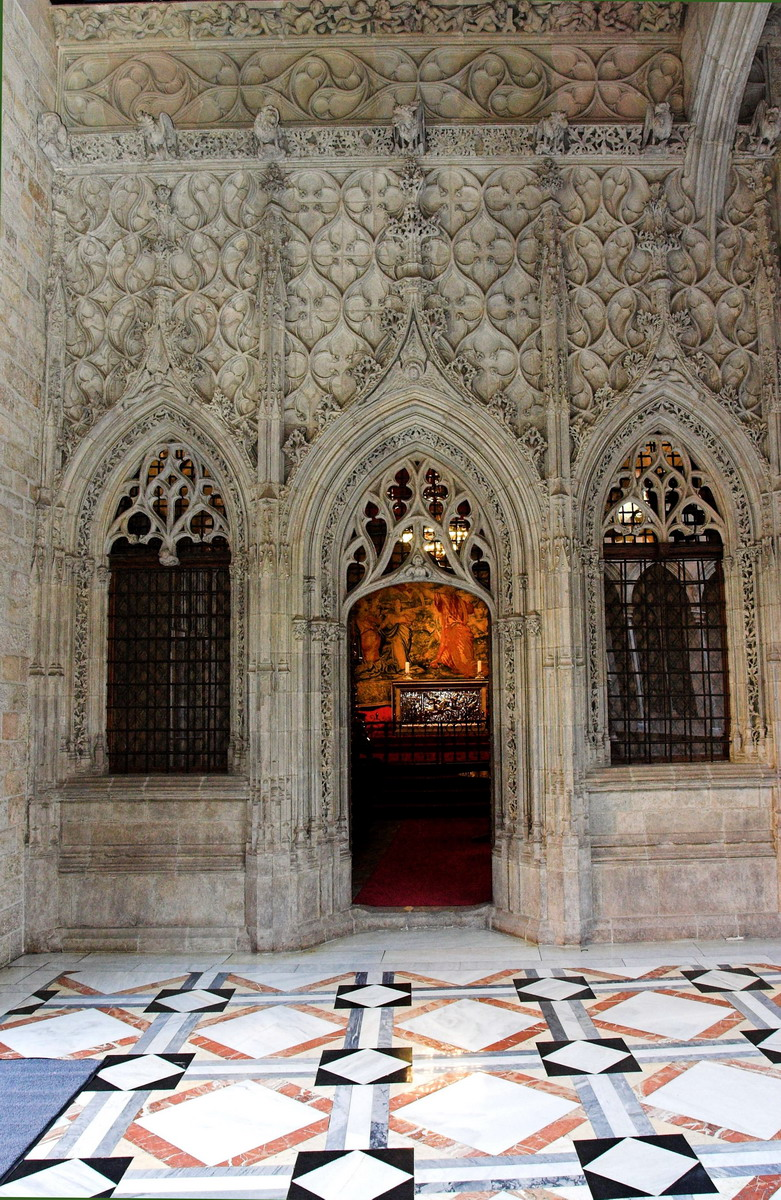
Façade of the Saint George chapel in the Generalitat Palace, Barcelona (1432–1434)

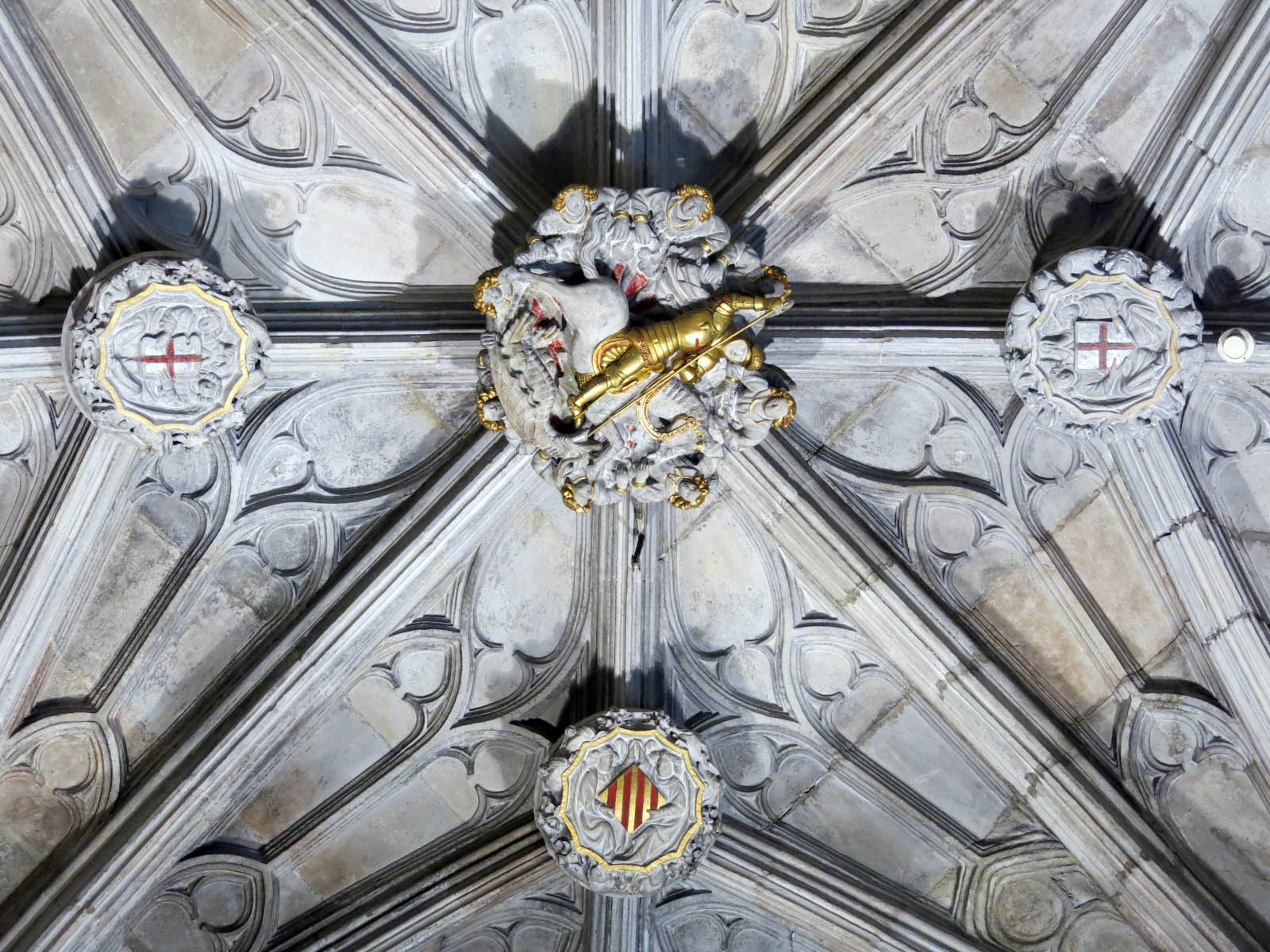
Vault of the Saint George chapel in the Generalitat Palace, Barcelona

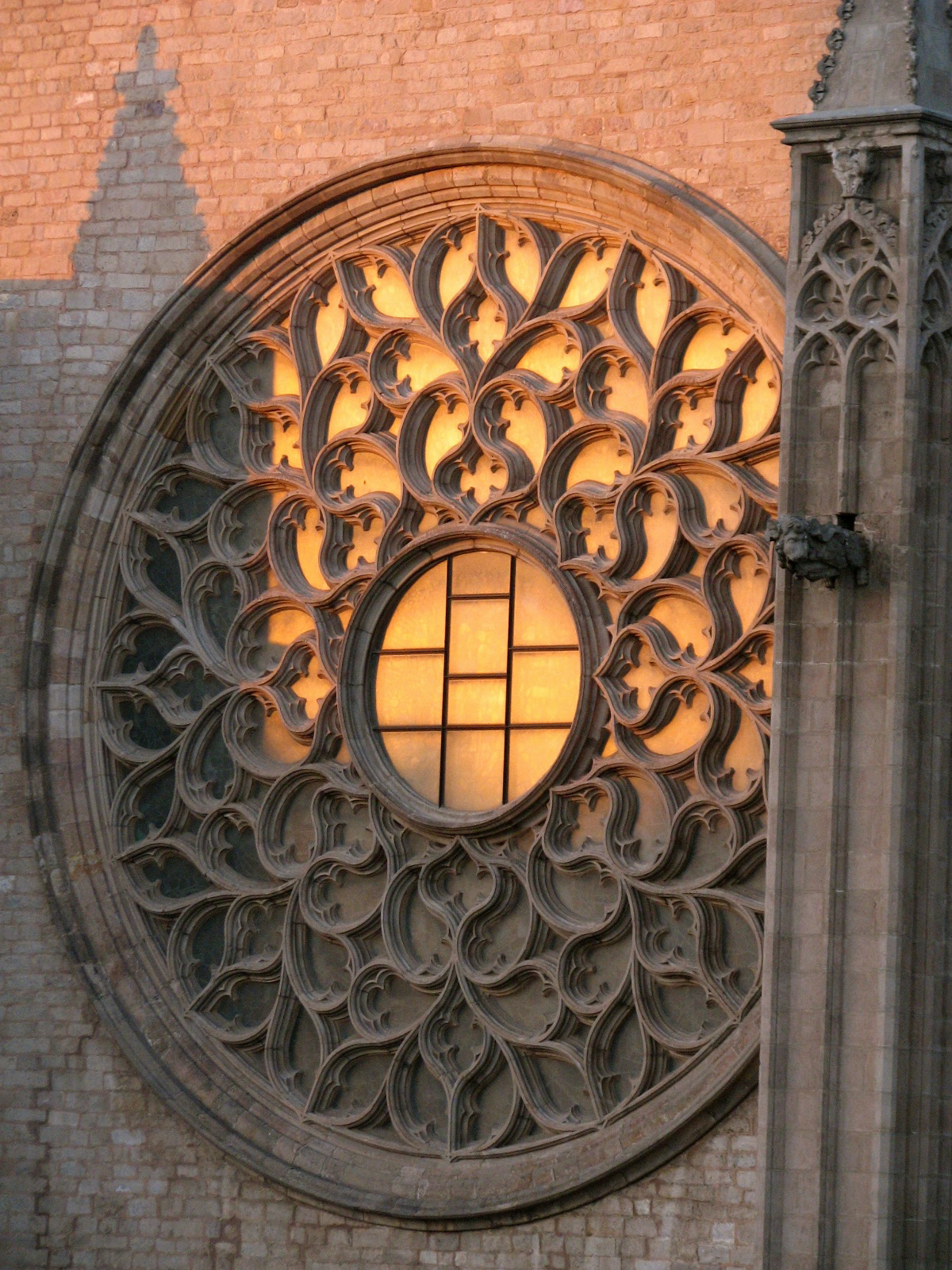
Rose window, west façade, Basílica de Santa Maria del Mar, Barcelona (1459)

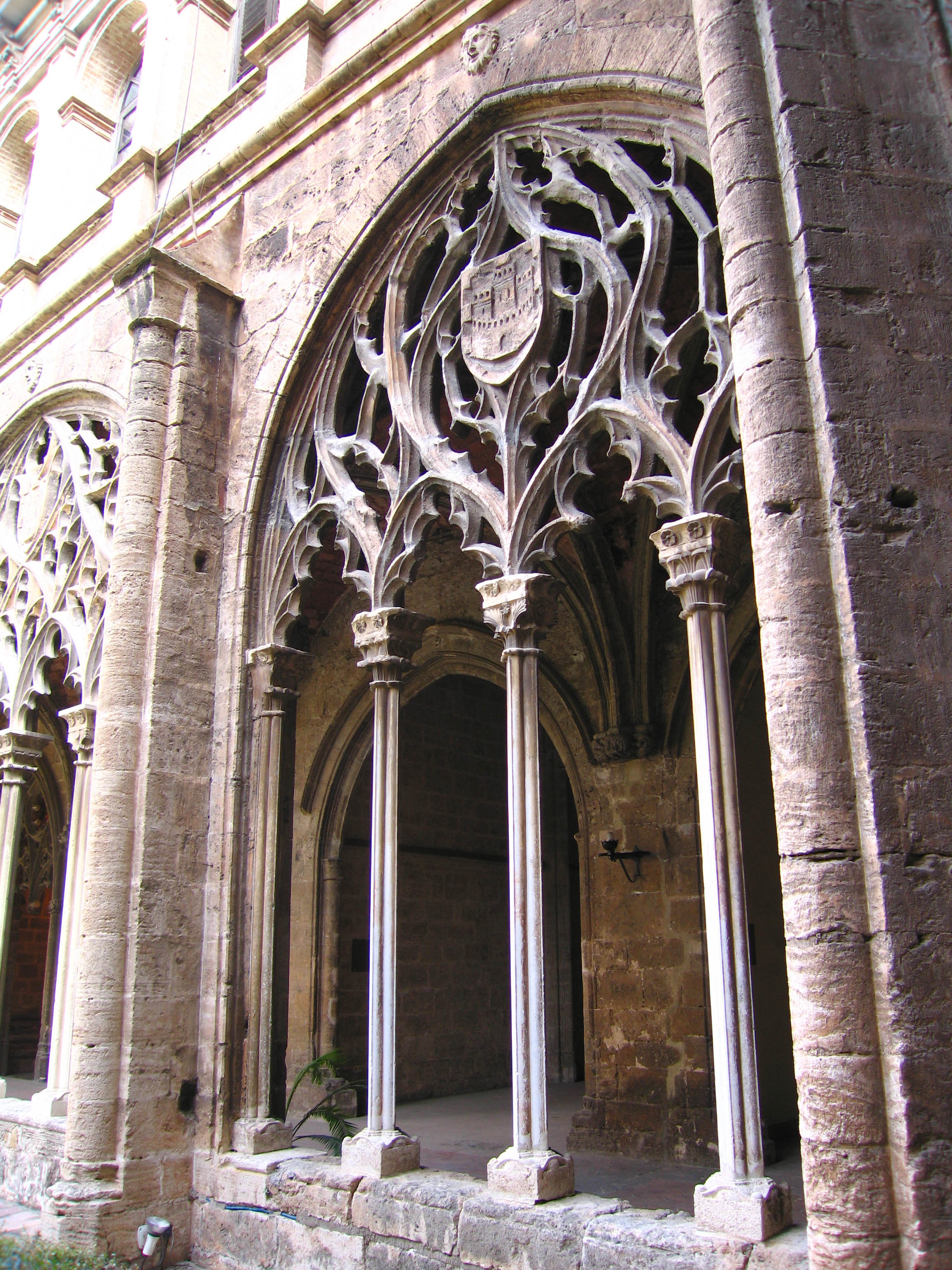
Cloister of the Convent of Sant Doménec, Valencia

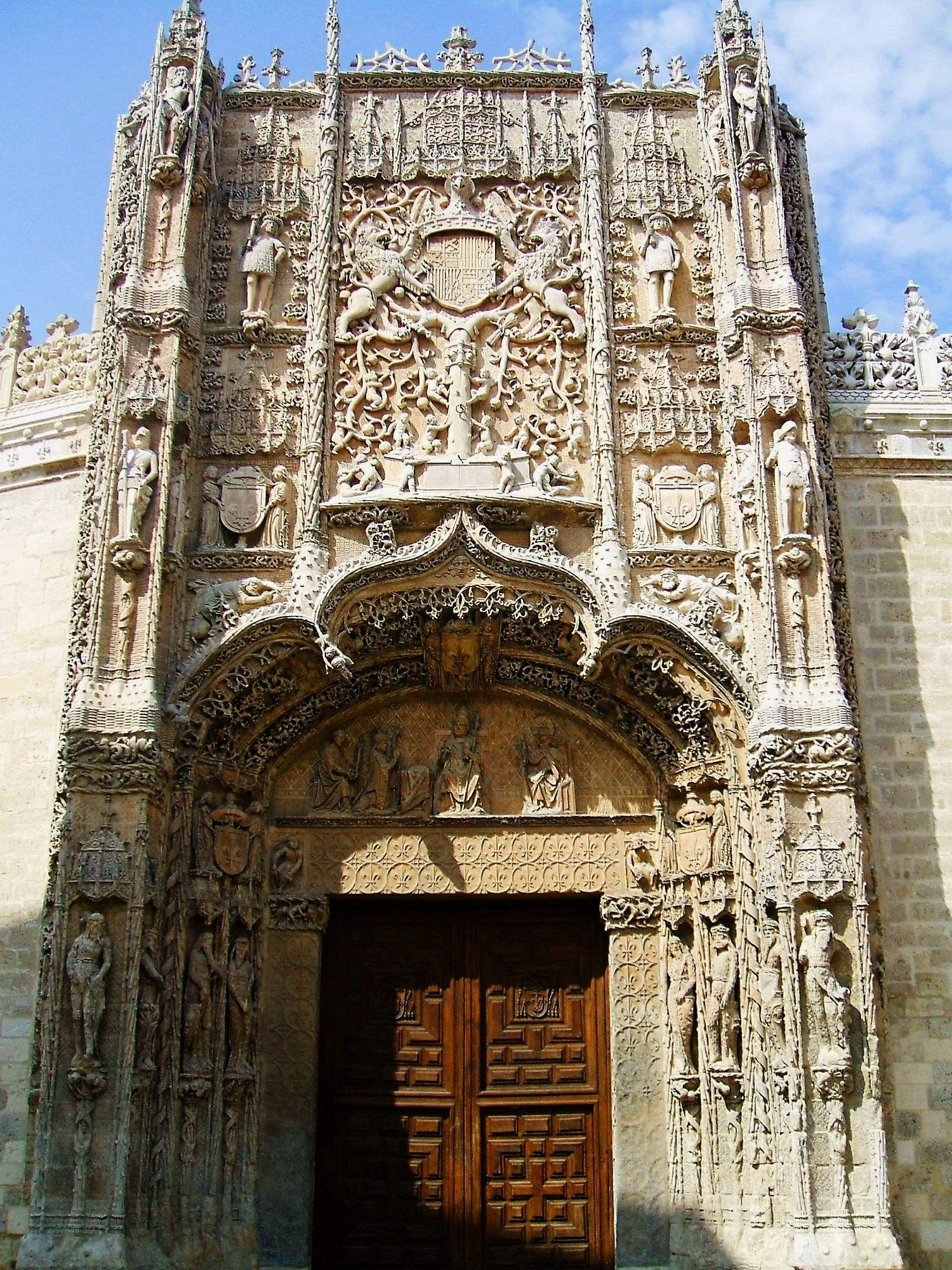
Colegio de San Gregorio (Completed 1487)

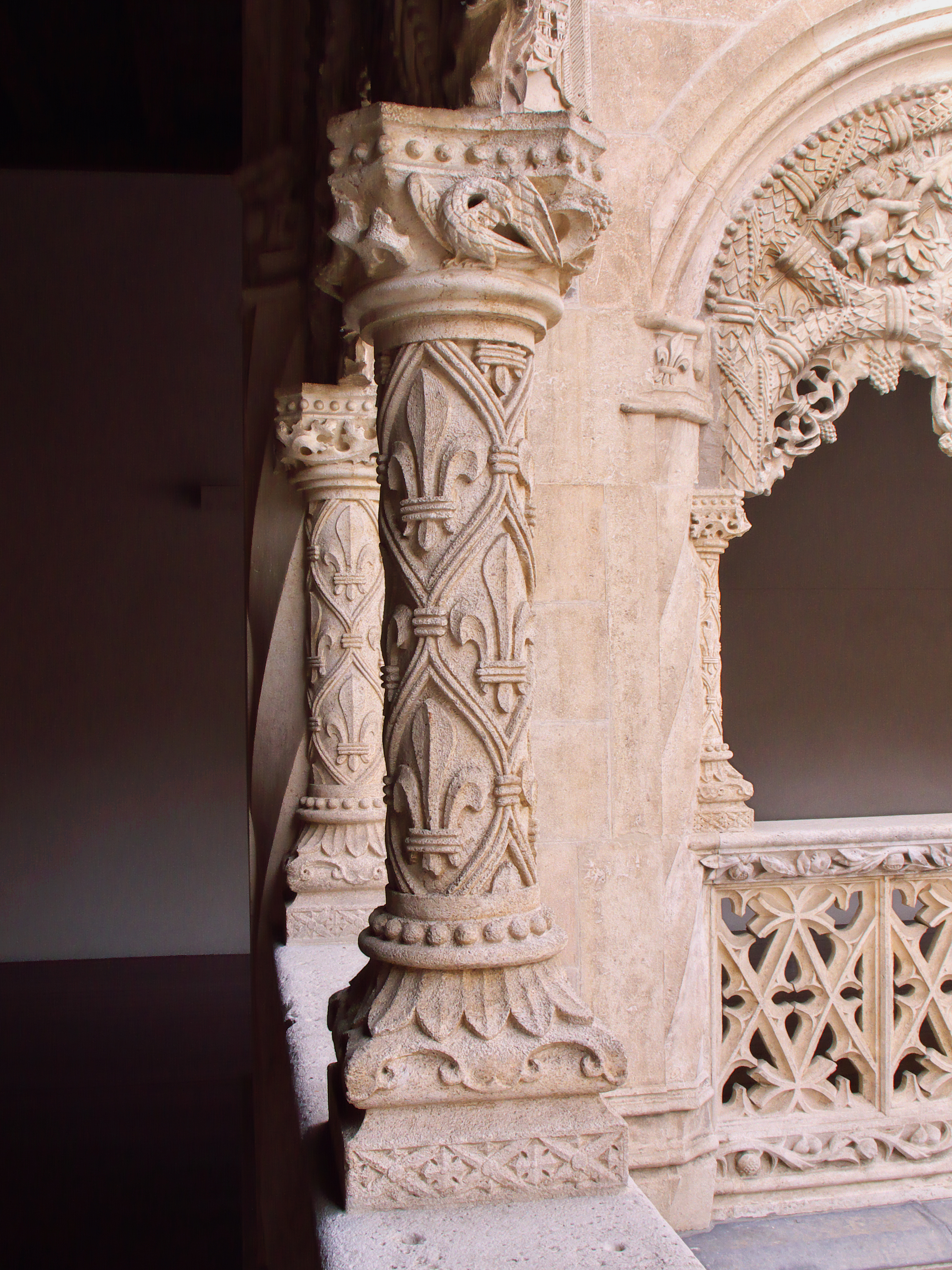
Decoration of Colegio de San Gregorio (1488–1496)

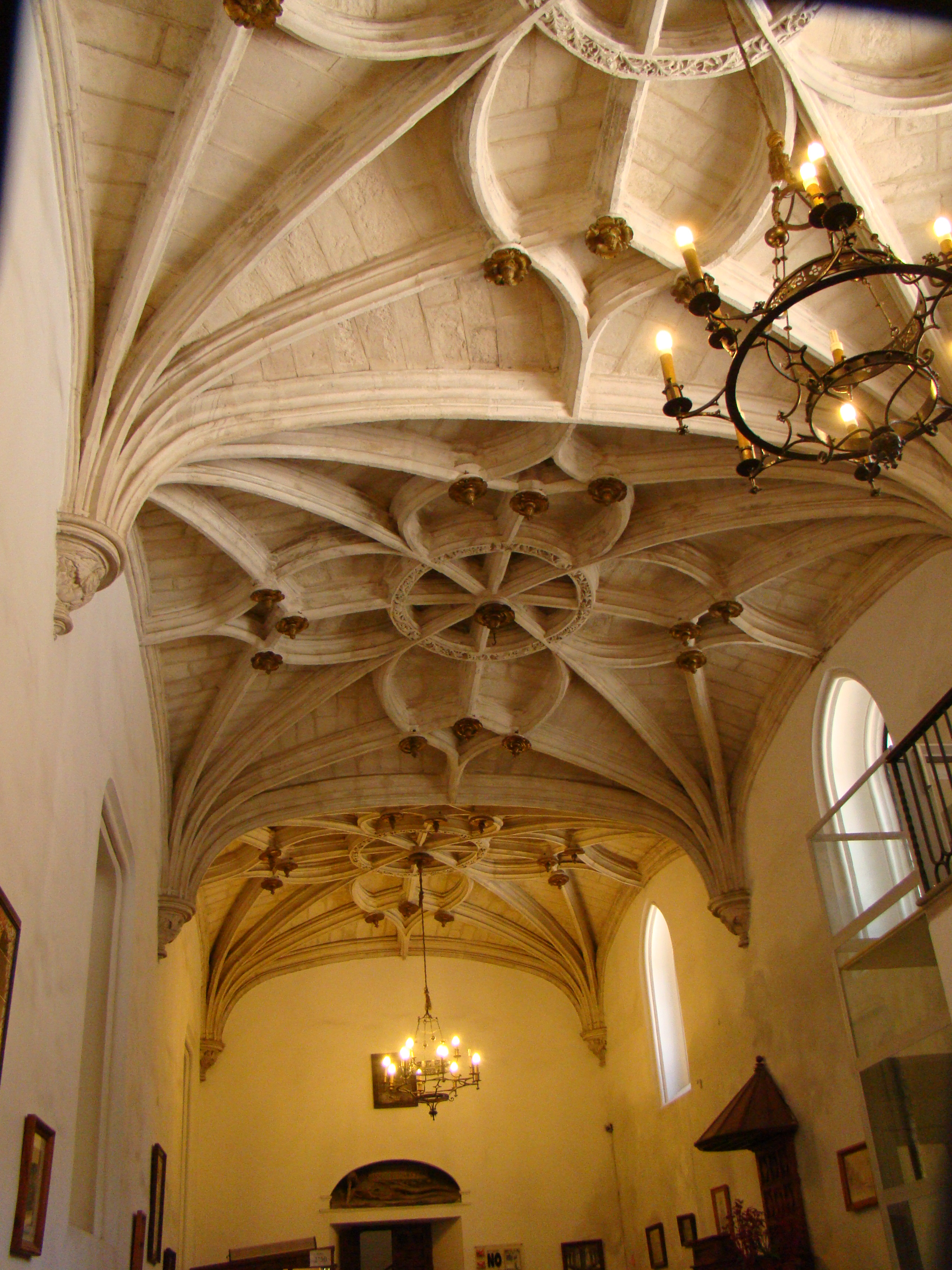
Vaults of the lower cloister of the Monastery of San Juan de los Reyes in Toledo (1477–1504)

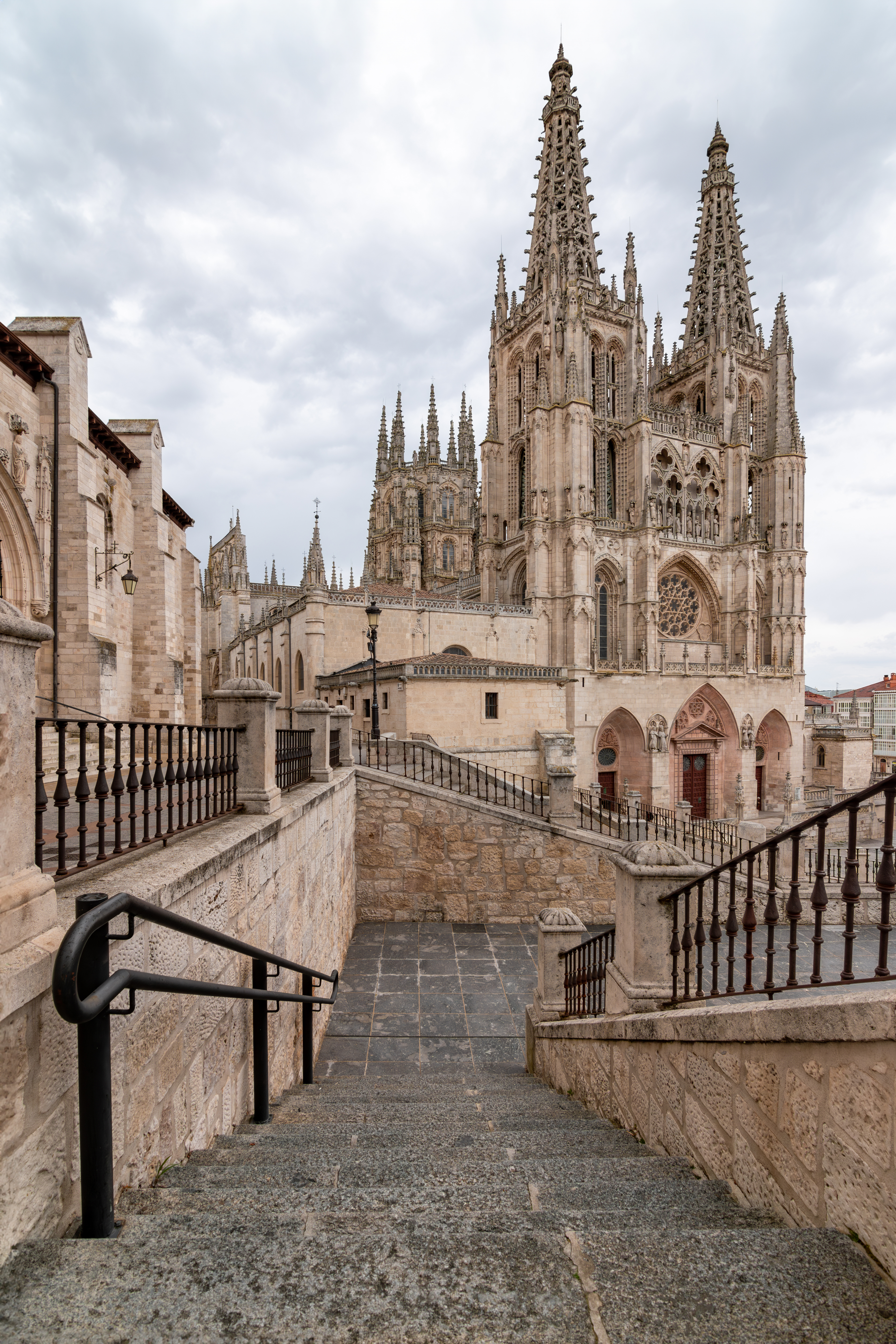
Façade and openwork spires of Burgos Cathedral (1440–1481) by Juan de Colonia and Simón de Colonia

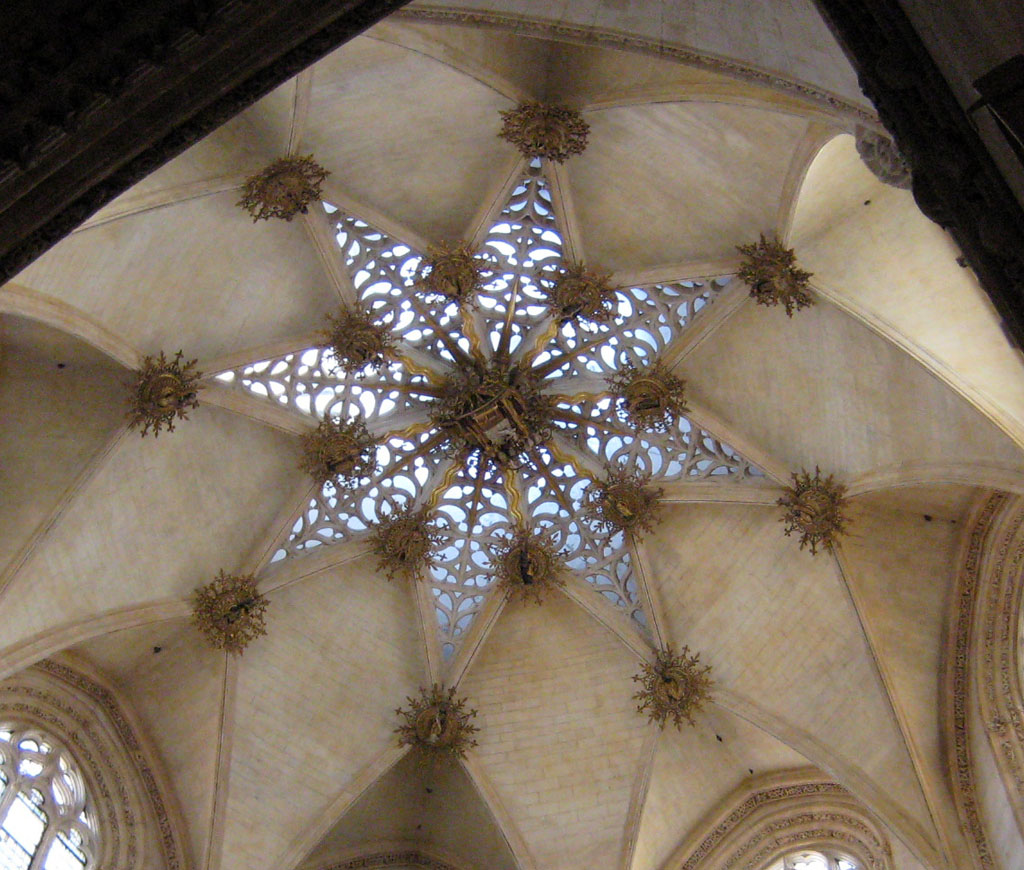
Star vault in the Constable Chapel of Burgos Cathedral by Simón de Colonia

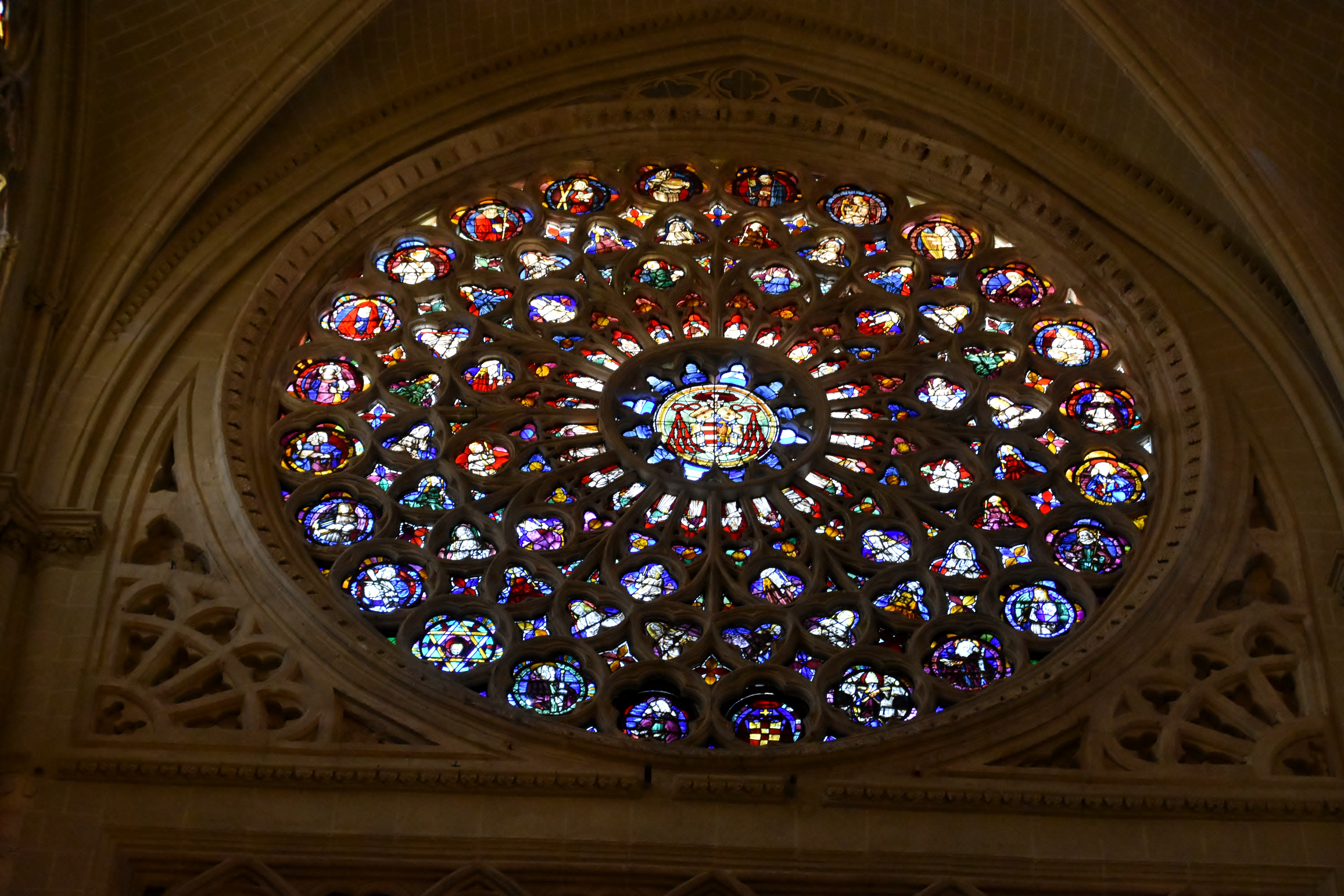
Rose window of west façade of Toledo Cathedral (end of 15th century)

== Portugal ==
The Manueline style was named for King Manuel I of Portugal, who reigned from 1495 to 1523, a period of cultural and economic splendour in Portugal, the style was originally known as ad modus hispaniae. Batalha Monastery's construction began in 1387 to celebrate John I of Portugal's victory over John I of Castile at the 1385 Battle of Aljubarrota, which secured the independence of the Kingdom of Portugal. Batalha was modified in the Flamboyant style after 1400. The building includes elements borrowed by the English Perpendicular style, tracery inspired by French Flamboyant, and German-inspired openwork steeples.

In 1495, Portuguese navigators opened a sea-route to India and began trading with Brazil, Goa, and Malacca, bringing enormous wealth into Portugal. King Manuel funded a series of new monasteries and churches that were covered with decoration inspired by banana trees, sea shells, billowing sails, seaweed, barnacles, and other exotic elements as a monument to the Portuguese navigator Vasco de Gama and to celebrate Portugal's empire. The most lavish example of this decoration is found on the Convent of Christ in Tomar (1510–1514).

Batalha Monastery (1386–1517)

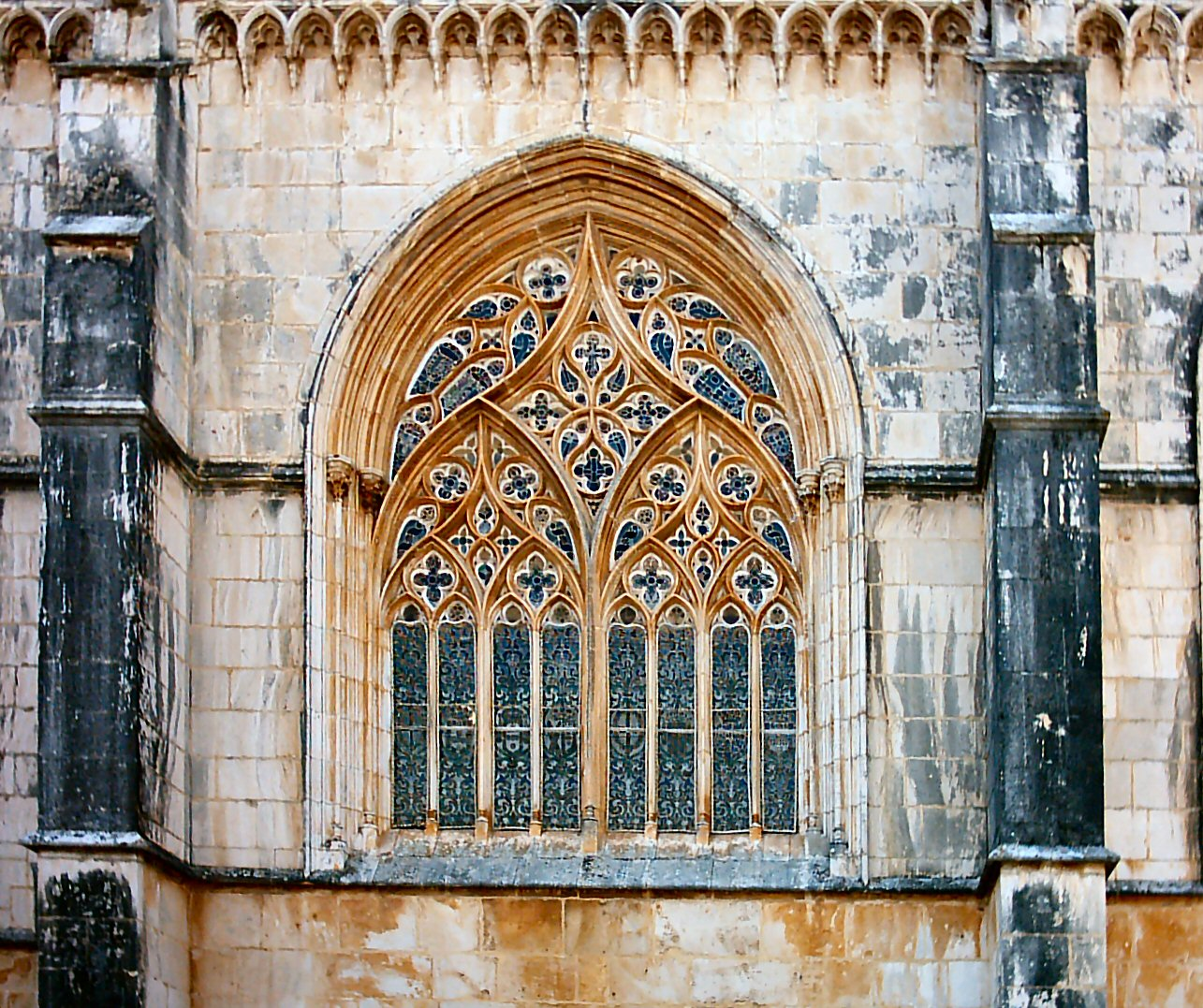
Flamboyant window of Batalha Monastery (1386–1517)

Jeronimos Monastery, Belém (1501–158)

Marine themed decoration of the Chapter House window of the Convent of Christ (Tomar) (1510–1514)

== Central Europe ==
Architects in central Europe adopted some forms and elements of Flamboyant in the late 14th century, and added many innovations of their own. The Late Gothic buildings of Austria, Bavaria, Saxony, and Bohemia are sometimes called Sondergotik. The high triple west porch of Ulm Minster was placed at the base of the tower; it was designed by Ulrich von Ensingen. The porch, which was in the centre of the façade — a break from earlier Gothic styles. Work on the tower was continued by Ensingen's son after 1419 and much more decoration was added from 1478 to 1492 by Matthaus Boblinger. The spire was added between 1881 and 1890, which made it the tallest tower in Europe.

Other remarkable towers were constructed like openwork webs of stone; these include Johannes Hultz's additions to the tower of Freiburg Minster, which had an open spiral staircase and a lacework octagonal spire; the additions were begun in 1419.

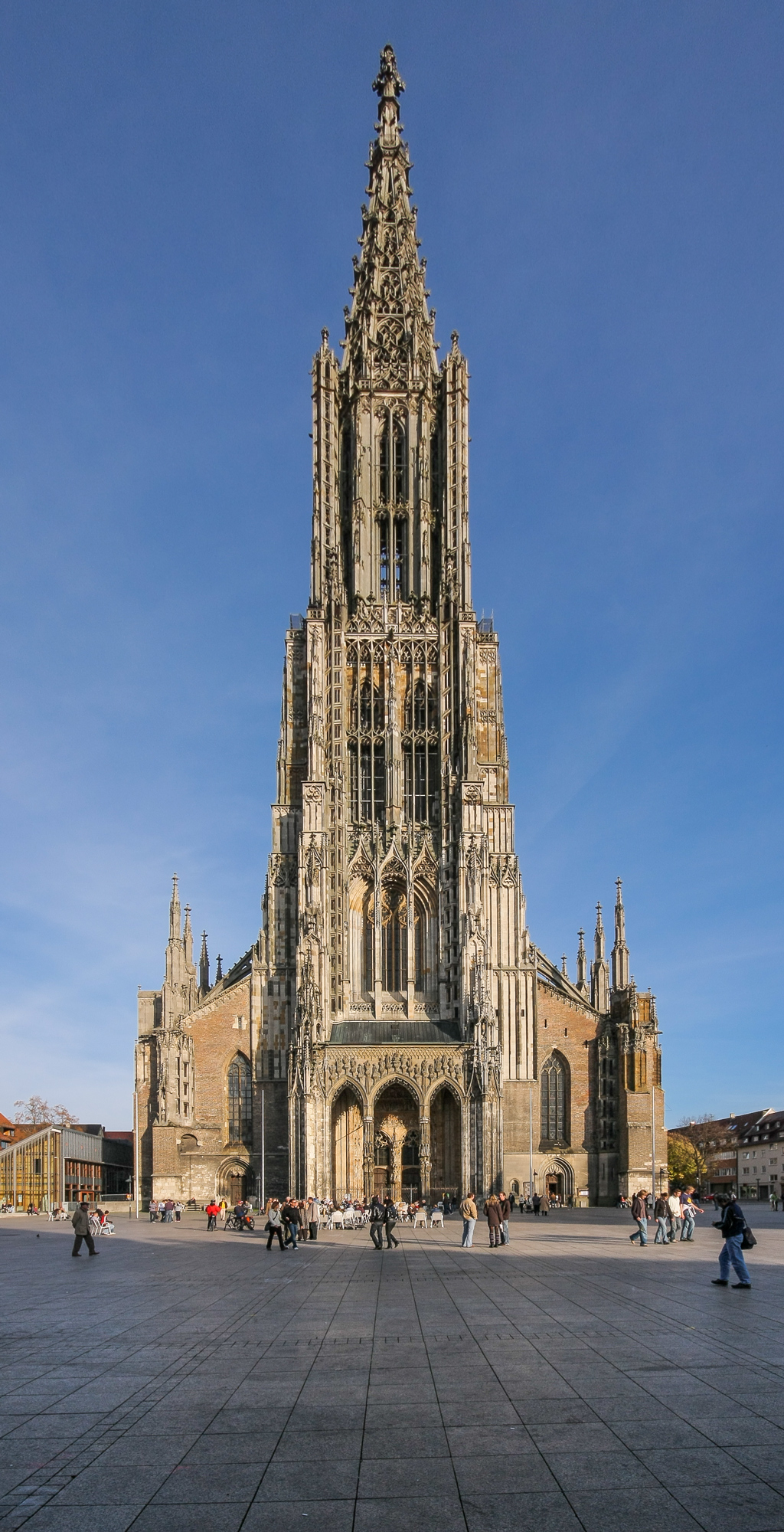
West porch and tower of Ulm Minster (begun late 14th century, completed 19th)

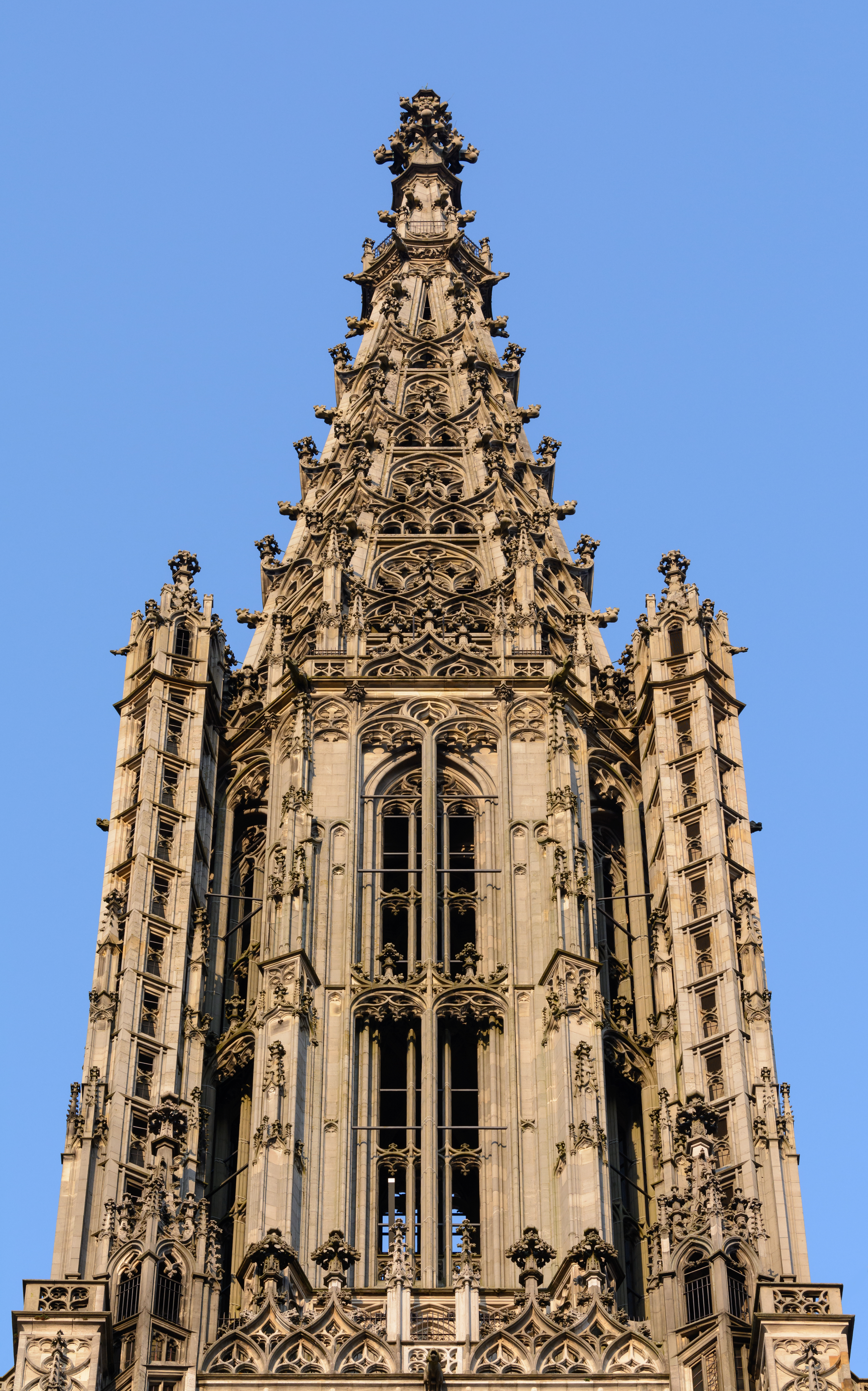
Detail of the tower of Ulm Minster, 19th century.

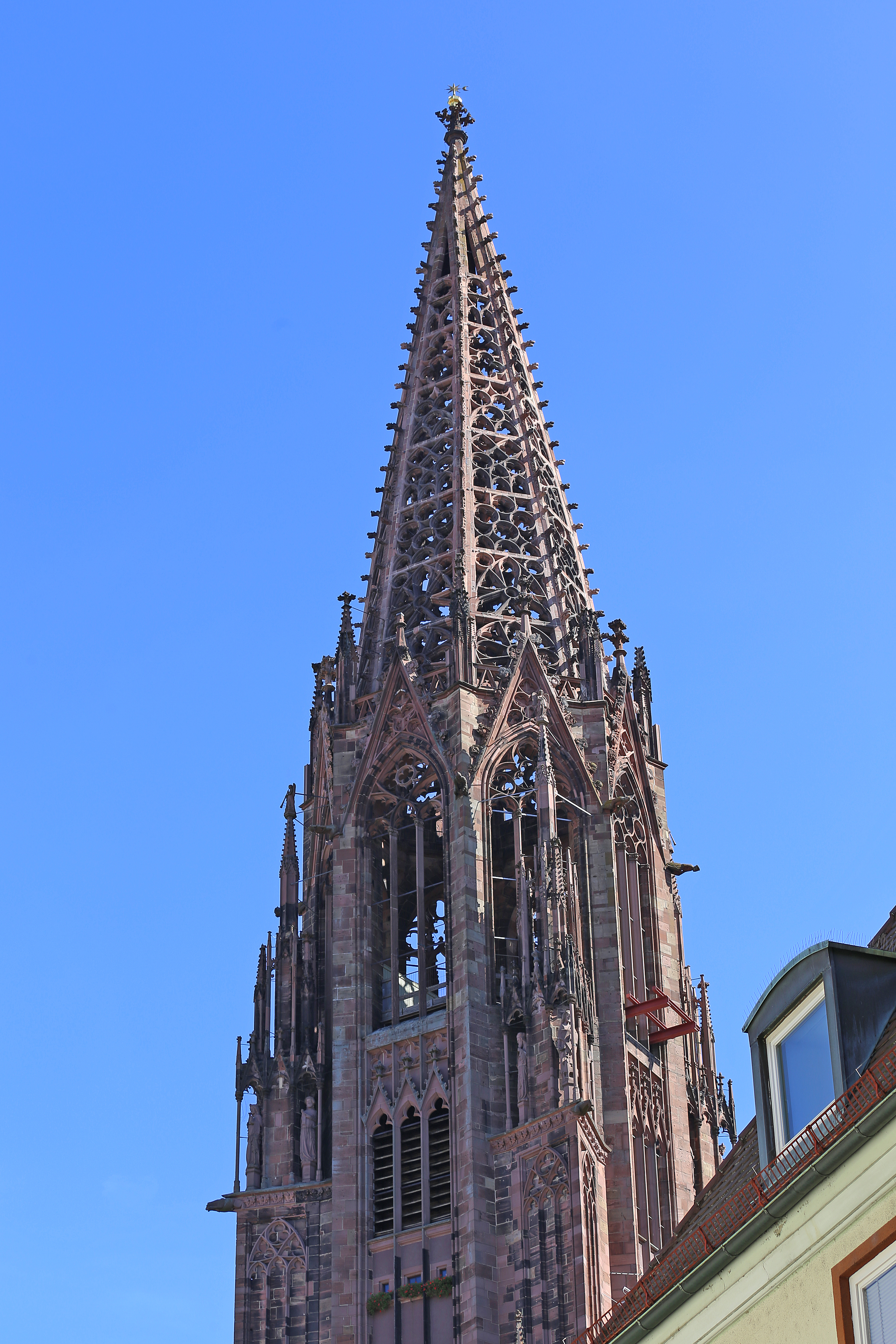
Detail of the tower of Freiburg Minster

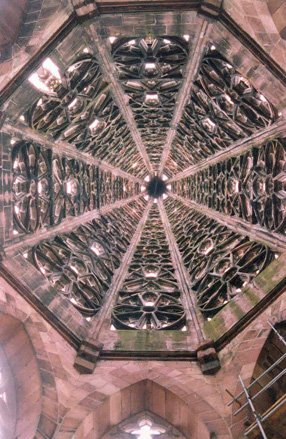
Looking up into the spire of Freiburg Minster (after 1419)

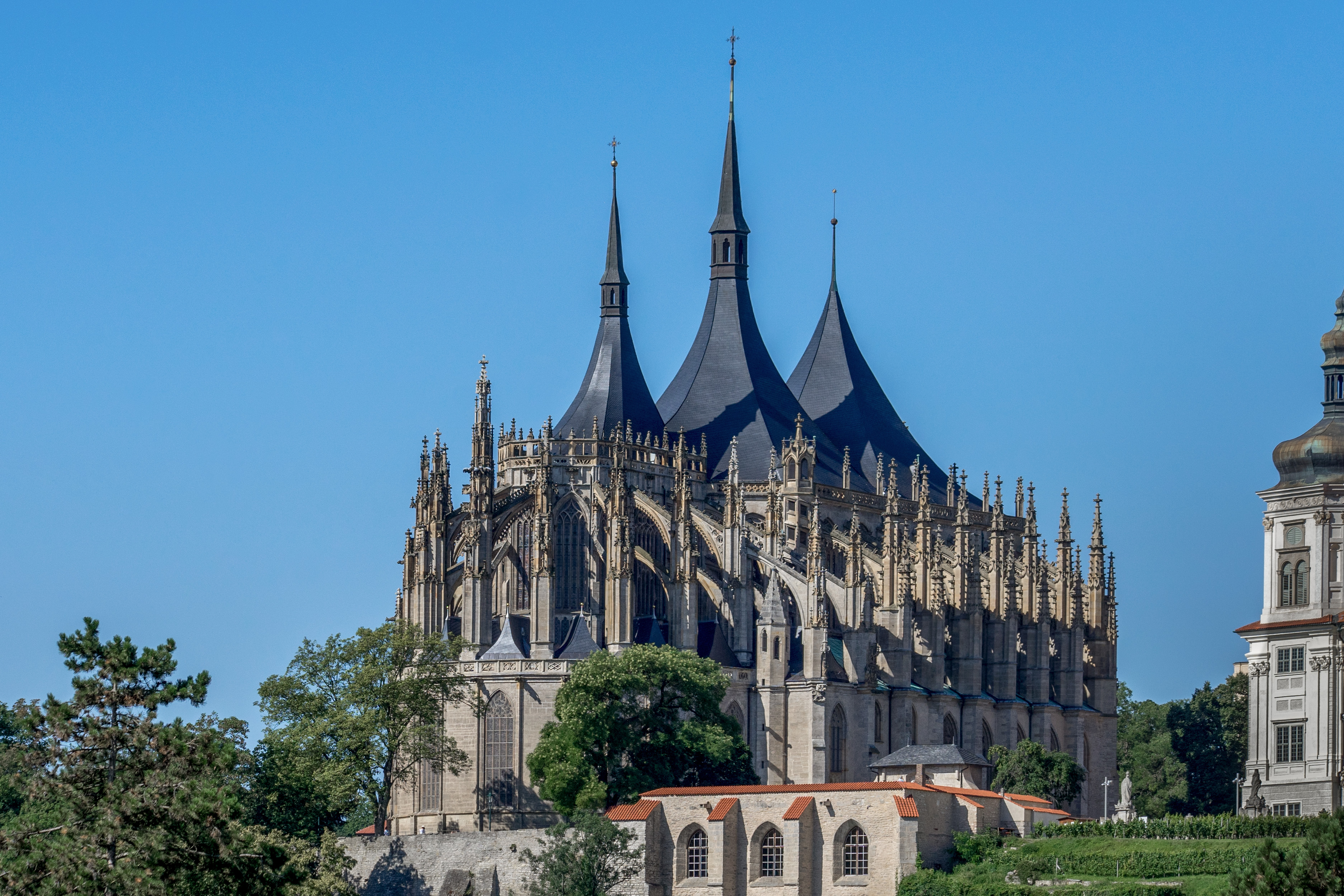
Exterior of St. Barbara's Church, Kutná Hora, 15th century, roof 19th.

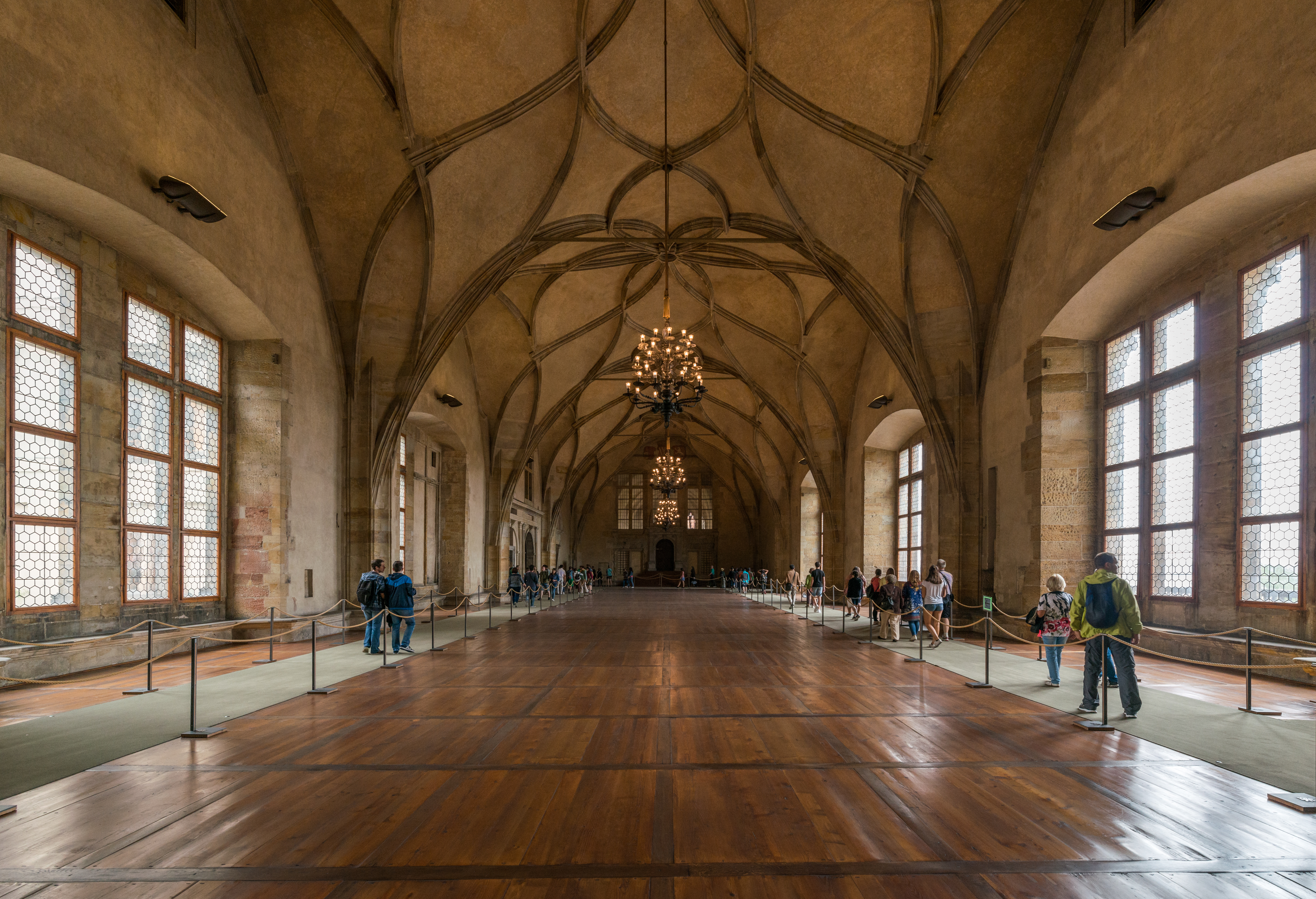
Vault of the Vladislav Hall, Prague Castle (1490-1502)

== British Isles ==
Flamboyant had little influence in England, where the Perpendicular style prevailed. Flamboyant architecture was not common in the British Isles but examples are numerous. The flame-like window tracery appeared at Gloucester Cathedral before it appeared in France. In Scotland, Flamboyant detailing was employed in window tracery of the northern side of the nave at Melrose Abbey, and for the west window that completed the construction of Brechin Cathedral. Melrose Abbey had been destroyed during the English invasion of 1358 and the initial rebuilding followed the traditions of English masons. From c.1400, the Parisian master-builder John Morow began work on the Abbey, leaving an inscription identifying him in the church's south transept. Morow had possibly been brought to Great Britain by Archibald Douglas, 4th Earl of Douglas, for whom he also worked on Lincluden Collegiate Church. The design of some windows in both Brechin and Melrose are so similar it is possible Morow or his team of Continental masons worked on both. Comparison can also be made with the chapel (1379–) of the Château de Vincennes, a castle and royal residence near Paris. Somewhat later, further Flamboyant work was done on the western bays of Brechin Cathedral.

In England, the contemporaneous Late Gothic (or Third Pointed) style Perpendicular Gothic was prevalent from the middle 14th century. A very early example of Flamboyant tracery is found in the top of the Great West Window in York Minster—the cathedral of the Archbishop of York. It also appears in the Flamboyant curvilinear bar-tracery of St Matthew's Church at Salford Priors, Warwickshire.

== Characteristics ==
=== Tracery ===
The flamboyant tracery designs are the most characteristic feature of the Flamboyant style. They appeared in the stone mullions, the framework of windows, particularly in the great rose windows of the period, and in complex, pointed, blind arcades and arched gables that were stacked atop one another, and which often covered the entire façade. They were also used in balustrades and other features. Interlocking openwork gables and balustrades, as seen on the west porch of the church of Saint-Maclou, Rouen, were often used to disguise or diffuse the mass of buildings.

An important early example from the late 15th century is the west rose window of the royal chapel, Sainte-Chapelle (1485–98), depicting the Apocalypse of St John. It is 9 meters (29.5 feet) in diameter, with eighty-nine panels arranged in three concentric zones around a central eye. Flamboyant rose windows are also prominent features of the transept of Sens Cathedral (15th c.) and the transept of Beauvais Cathedral (1499), one of the few parts of that Cathedral still standing. The Flamboyant façades of Sens Cathedral, Beauvais Cathedral, Senlis Cathedral and Troyes Cathedral (1502–1531) were all the work of the same master builder, Martin Chambiges.

Flamboyant windows were often composed of two arched windows, over which was a pointed, oval design divided by curving lines called soufflets and mouchettes. Examples are found in the Church of Saint-Pierre, Caen. Mouchettes and soufflets were also applied in openwork form to gables, as seen on the west façade of Trinity Abbey, Vendôme.

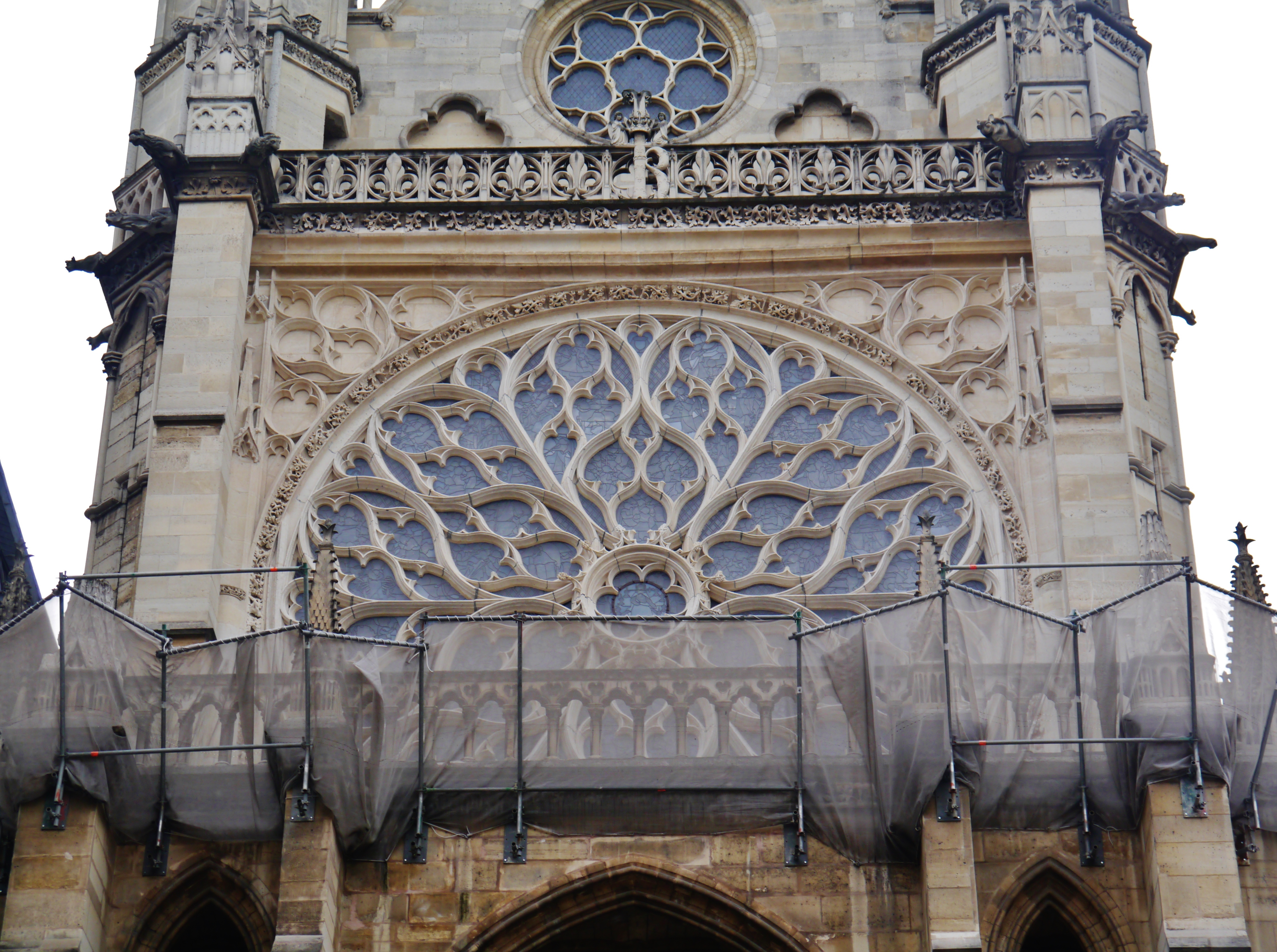
West rose window of Saint Chapelle (1485–1498)

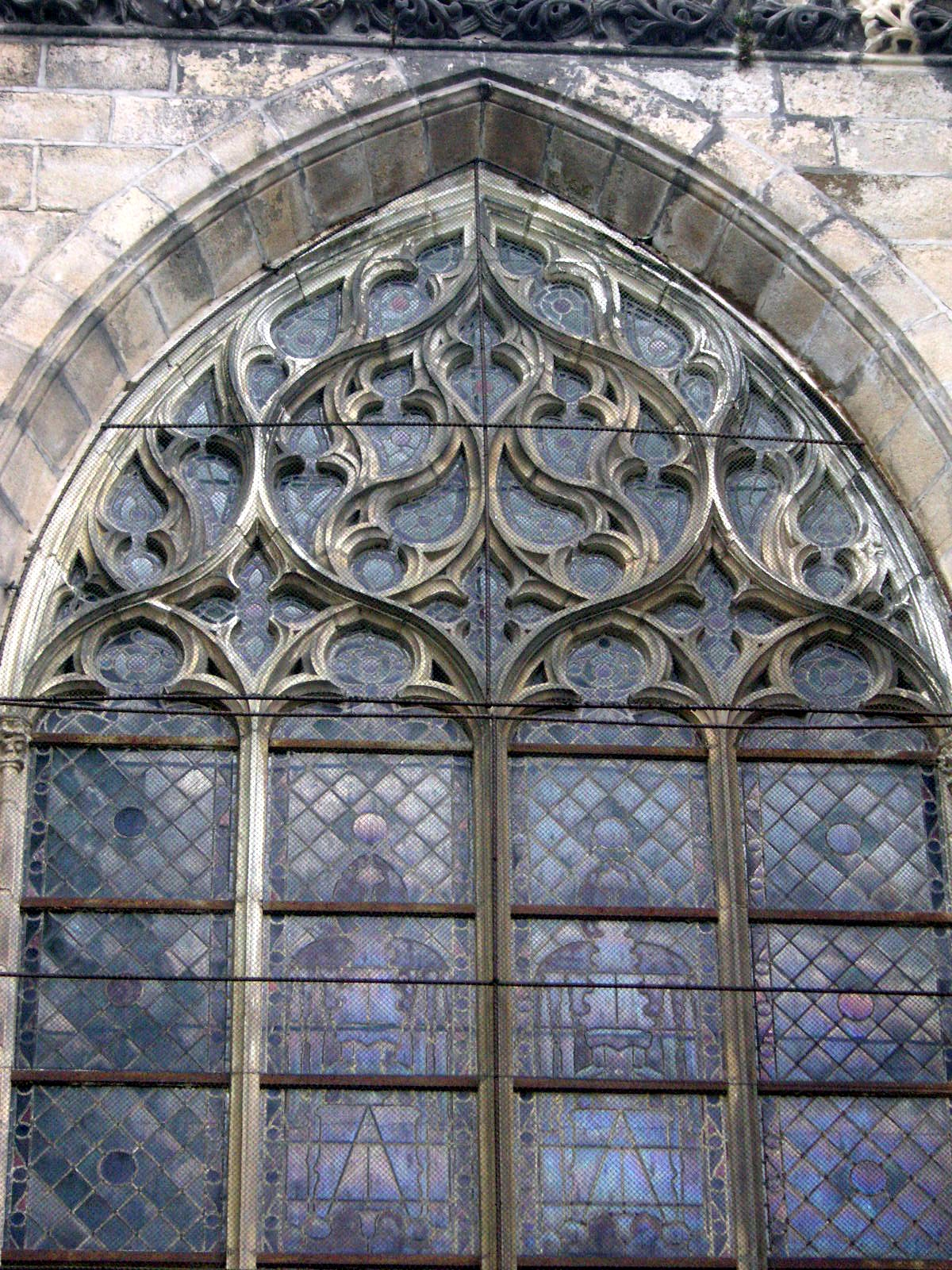
Flamboyant window tracery, Limoges Cathedral (late 15th century)

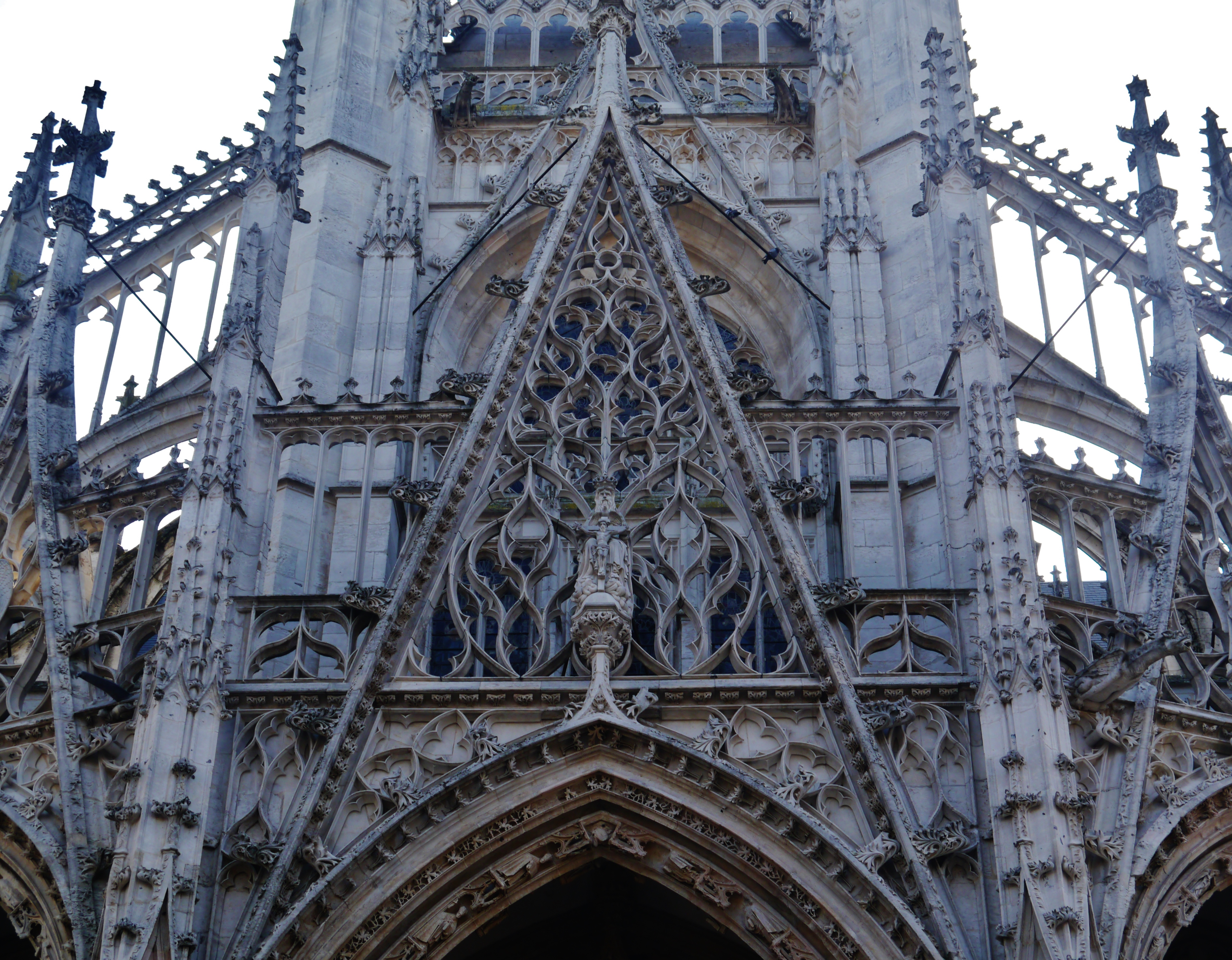
Openwork gable and balustrade, west porch, church of Saint-Maclou, Rouen (1435–1521)

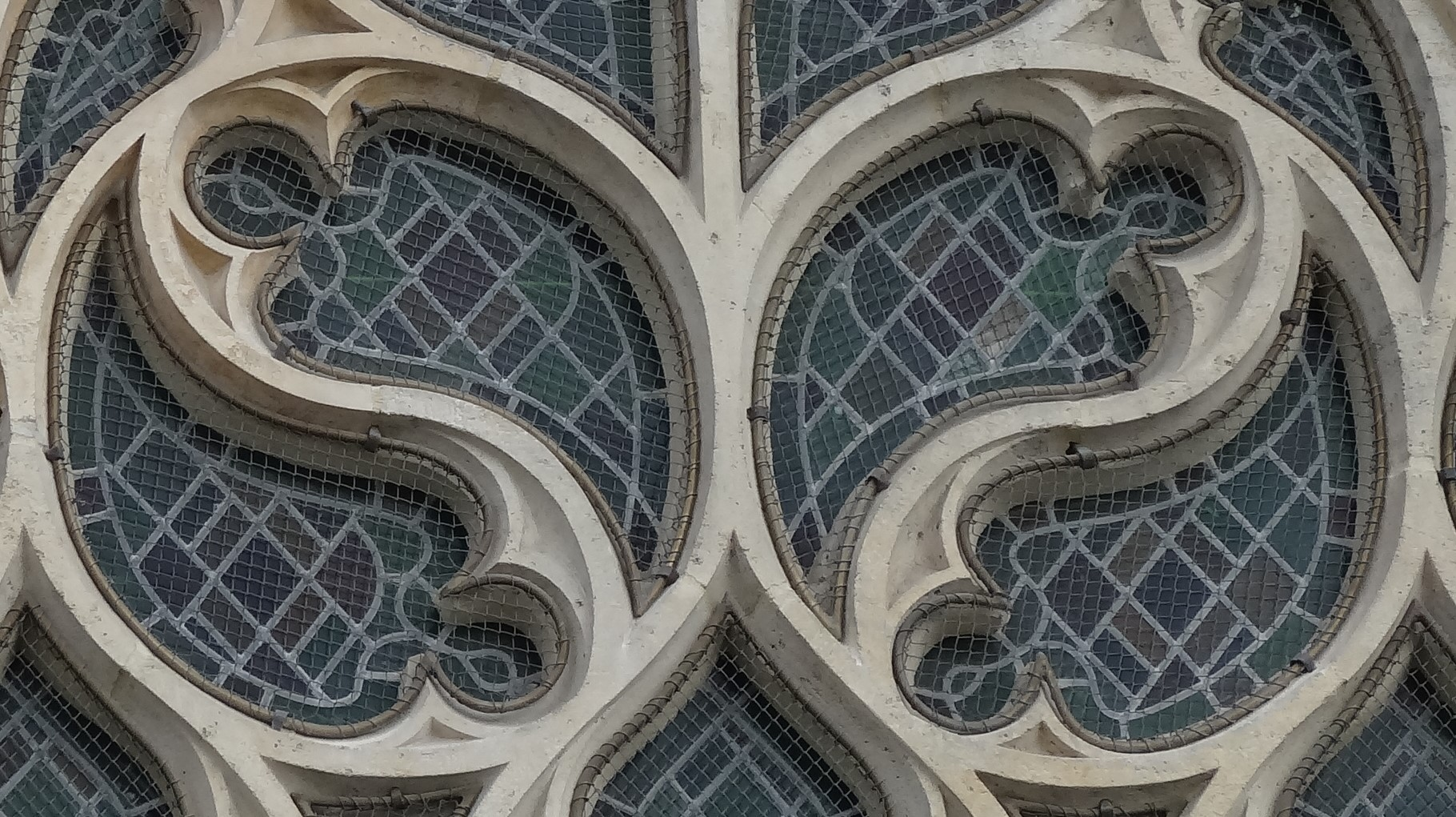
Mouchettes in the south façade windows of the Church of Saint-Pierre, Caen

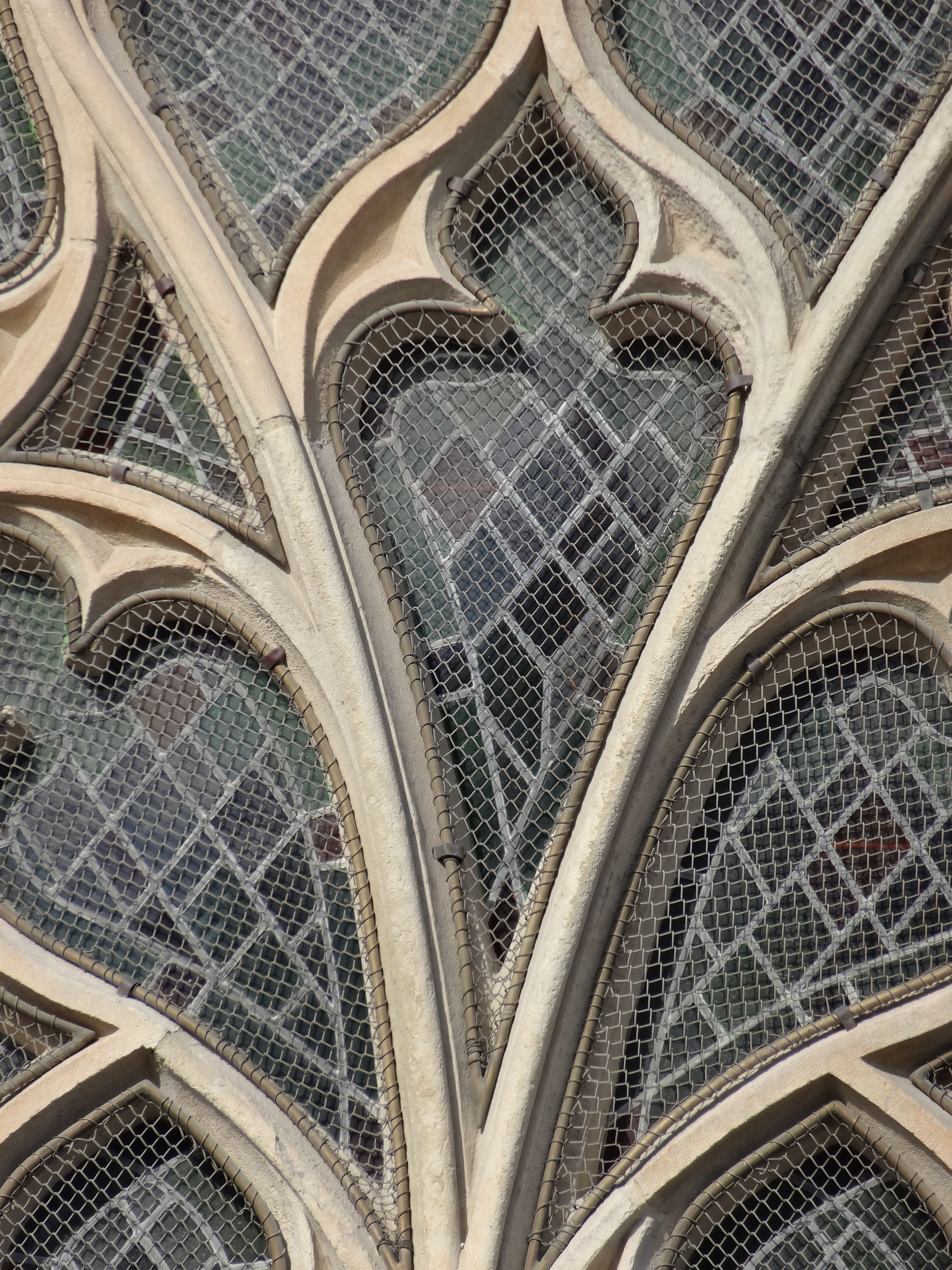
A soufflet from a window on the south façade of the Church of Saint-Pierre, Caen

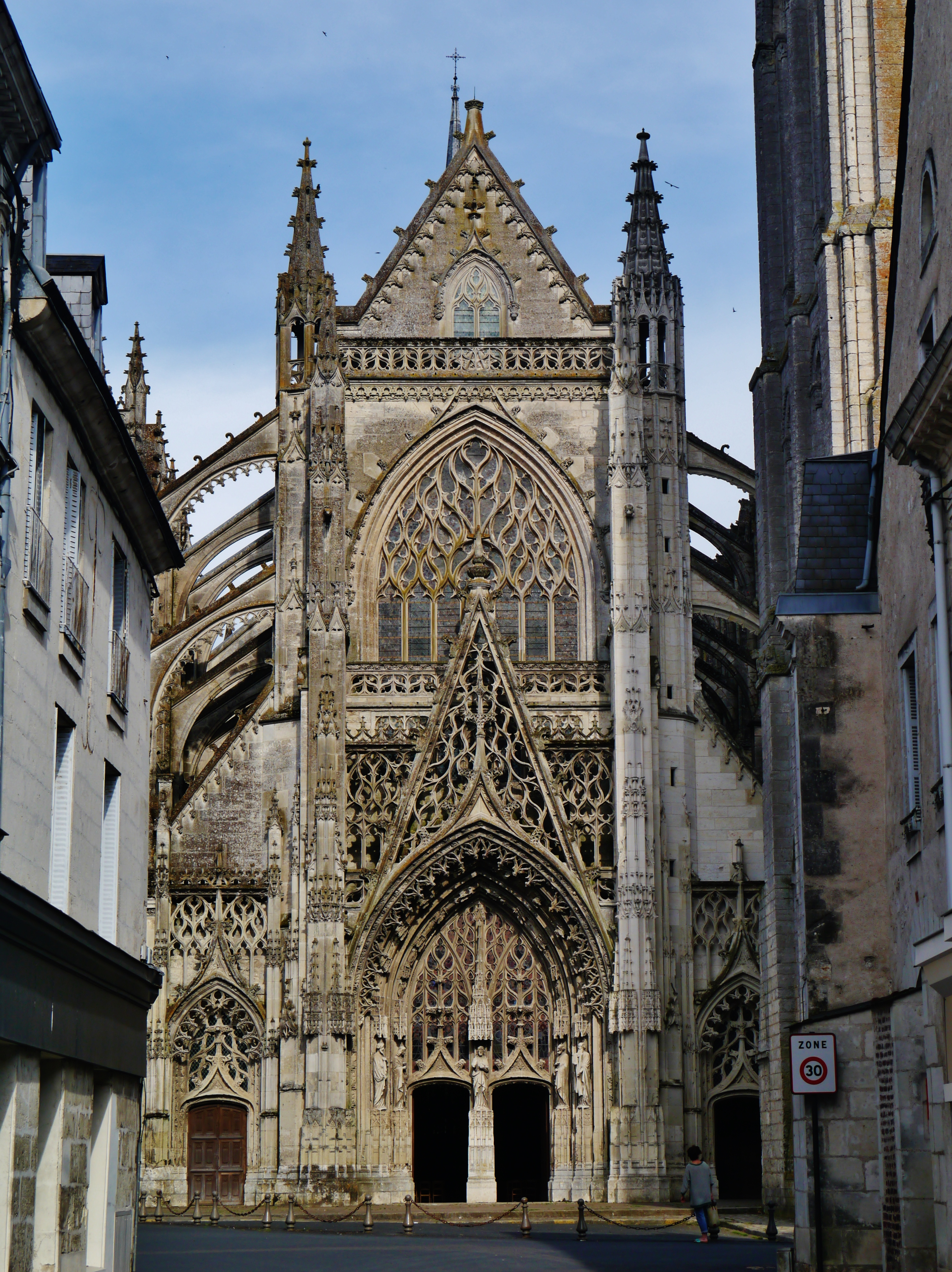
West façade of Trinity Abbey, Vendôme

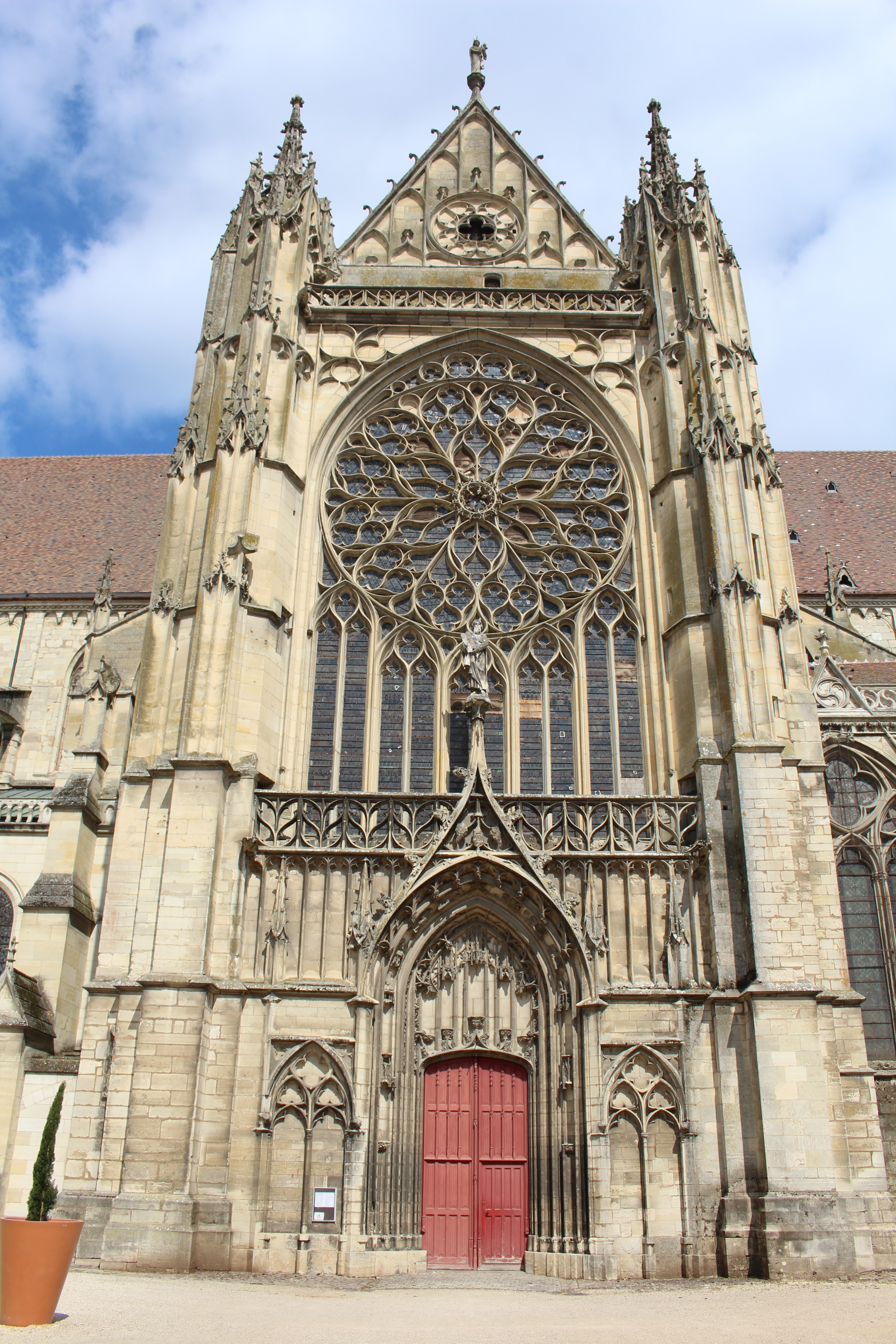
Flamboyant rose window and façade, south transept Sens Cathedral (late 15th–early 16th century)

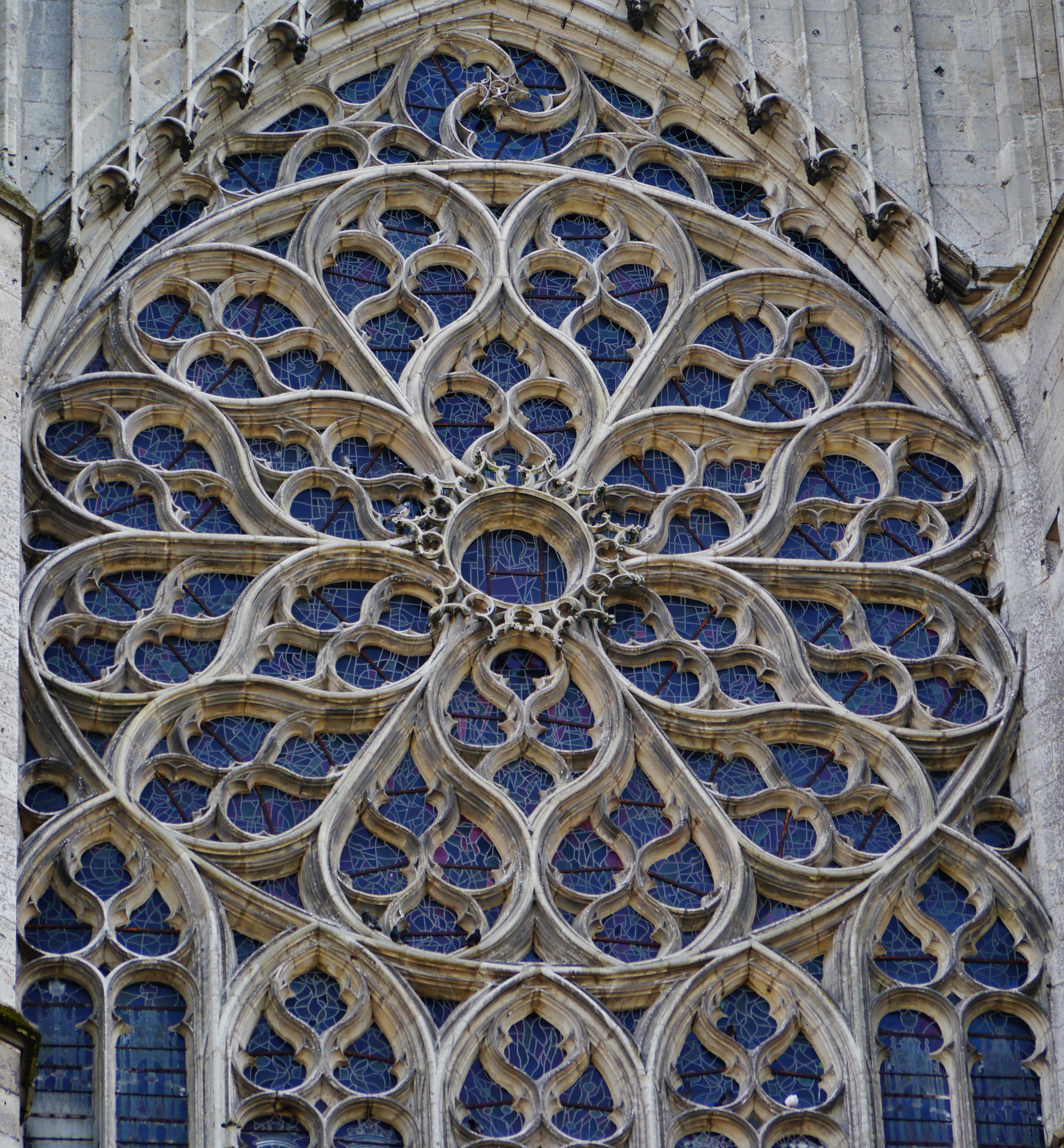
North rose window, Beauvais Cathedral (1540–1548)

=== Façades and porches ===
The term "Flamboyant" typically refers to church façades and to some secular buildings such as the Palais de Justice in Rouen. Church façades and porches were often the most elaborate architectural features of towns and cities, especially in France, and frequently projected outwards onto marketplaces and town squares. The intricate and dazzling forms of many façades and porches often appealed to their urban contexts; in some cases, new façades and porches were designed to create impressive architectural vistas when viewed from a specific street or square. This architectural response to increasing concerns with the aesthetics of urban space is particularly notable in Normandy, where a striking group of late 15th- and early 16th-century projecting polygonal porches were constructed in the Flamboyant style; examples include Notre-Dame, Alençon; La Trinité, Falaise; Notre-Dame, Louviers; and Saint-Maclou, Rouen.

Martin Chambiges, the most prolific French architect between c. 1480 and c. 1530, combined three-dimensional forms such as nodding ogees with a miniaturized vocabulary of niches, baldachins, and pinnacles to produce dynamic façades with a new sense of depth at Sens Cathedral, Beauvais Cathedral, and Troyes Cathedral. The addition of sumptuous Flamboyant façades and porches provided new public faces to older monuments that survived the Hundred Years' War. Façades and porches often used the arc en accolade, an arched doorway that was topped by short pinnacle with a fleuron or carved stone flower, often resembling a lily. The short pinnacle bearing the fleuron had its own decoration of small, sculpted forms like twisting leaves of cabbage or other naturalistic vegetation. There were also two slender pinnacles, one on either side of the arch.

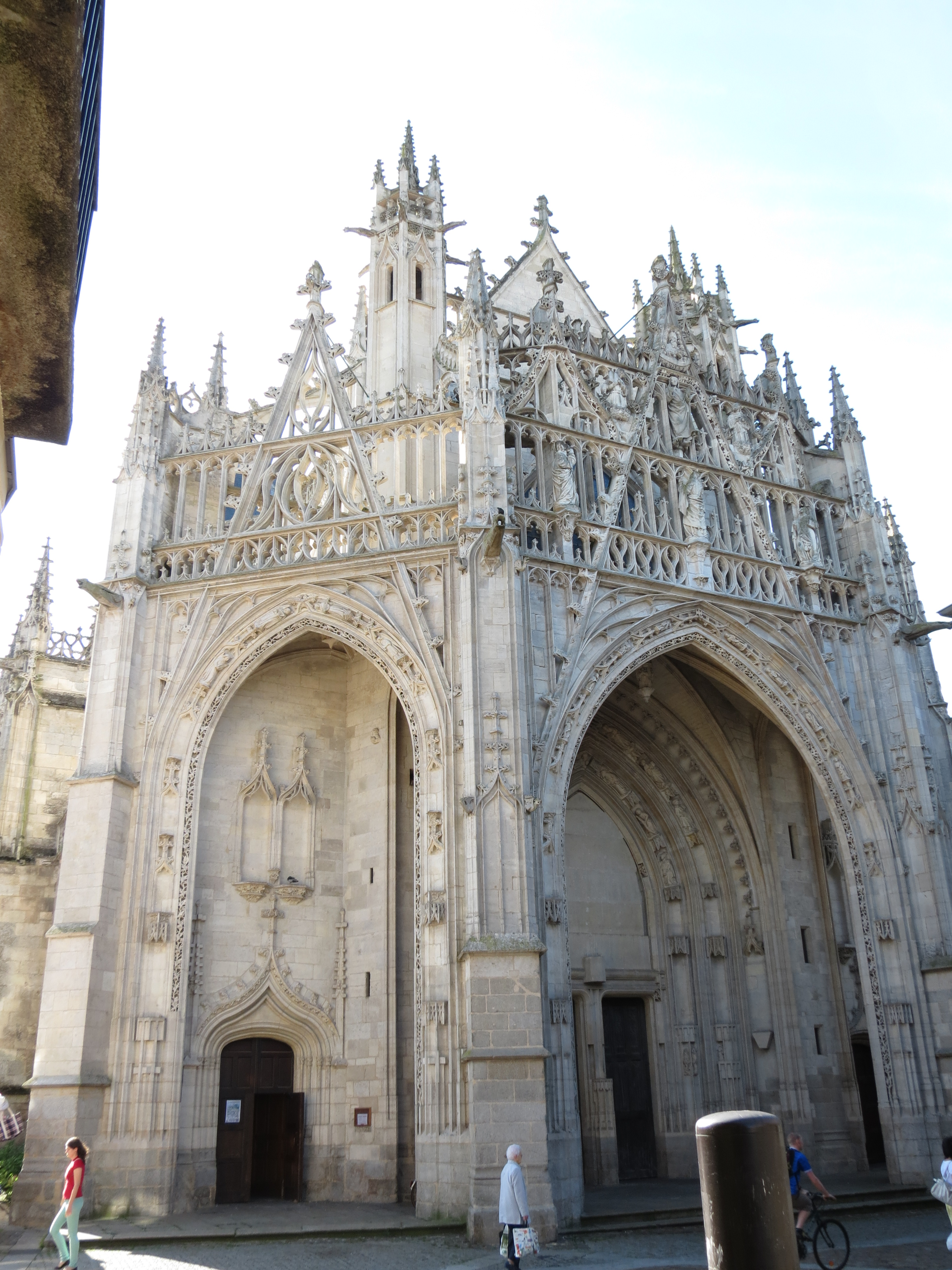
West porch, Notre-Dame d'Alençon

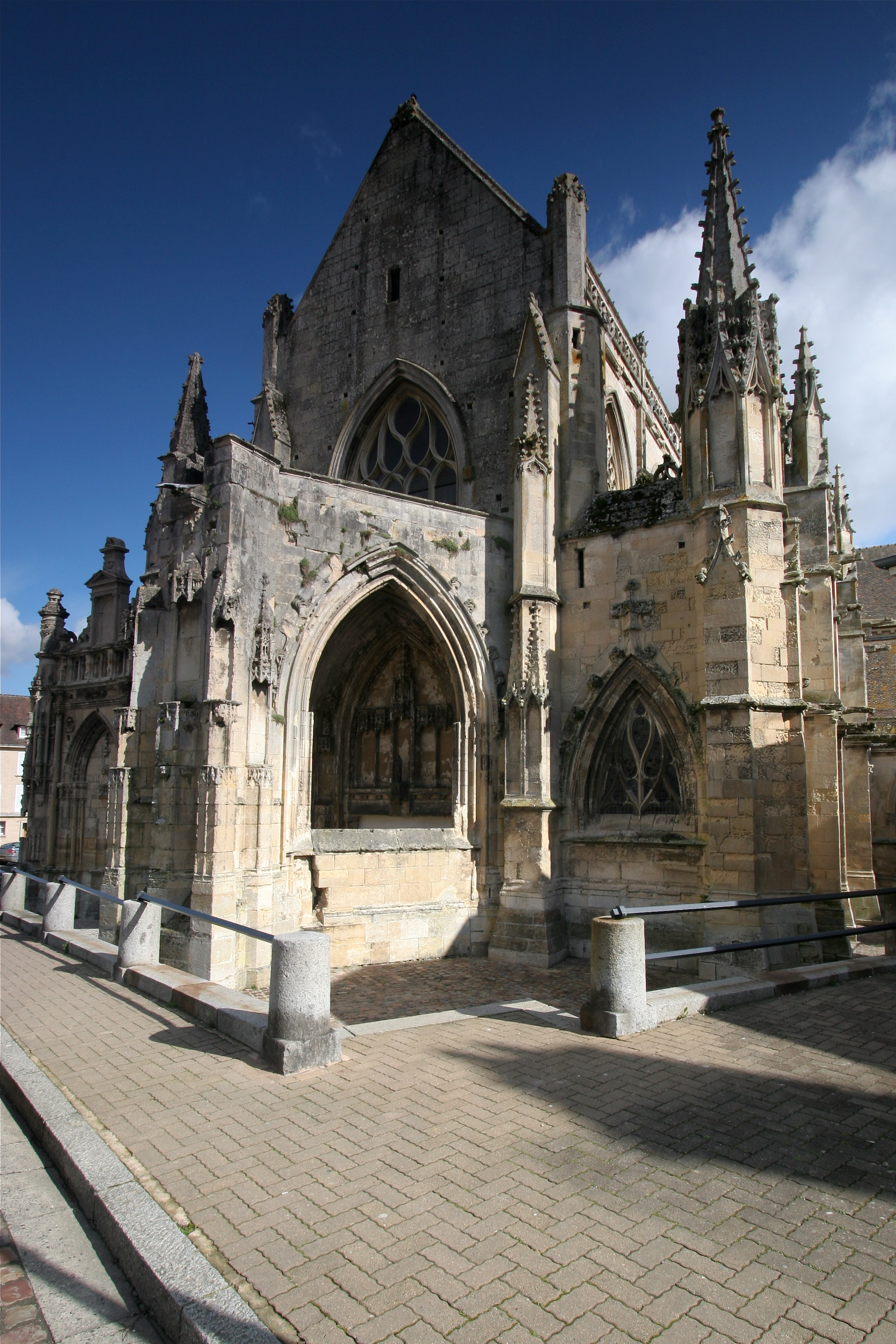
West porch, La Trinité, Falaise

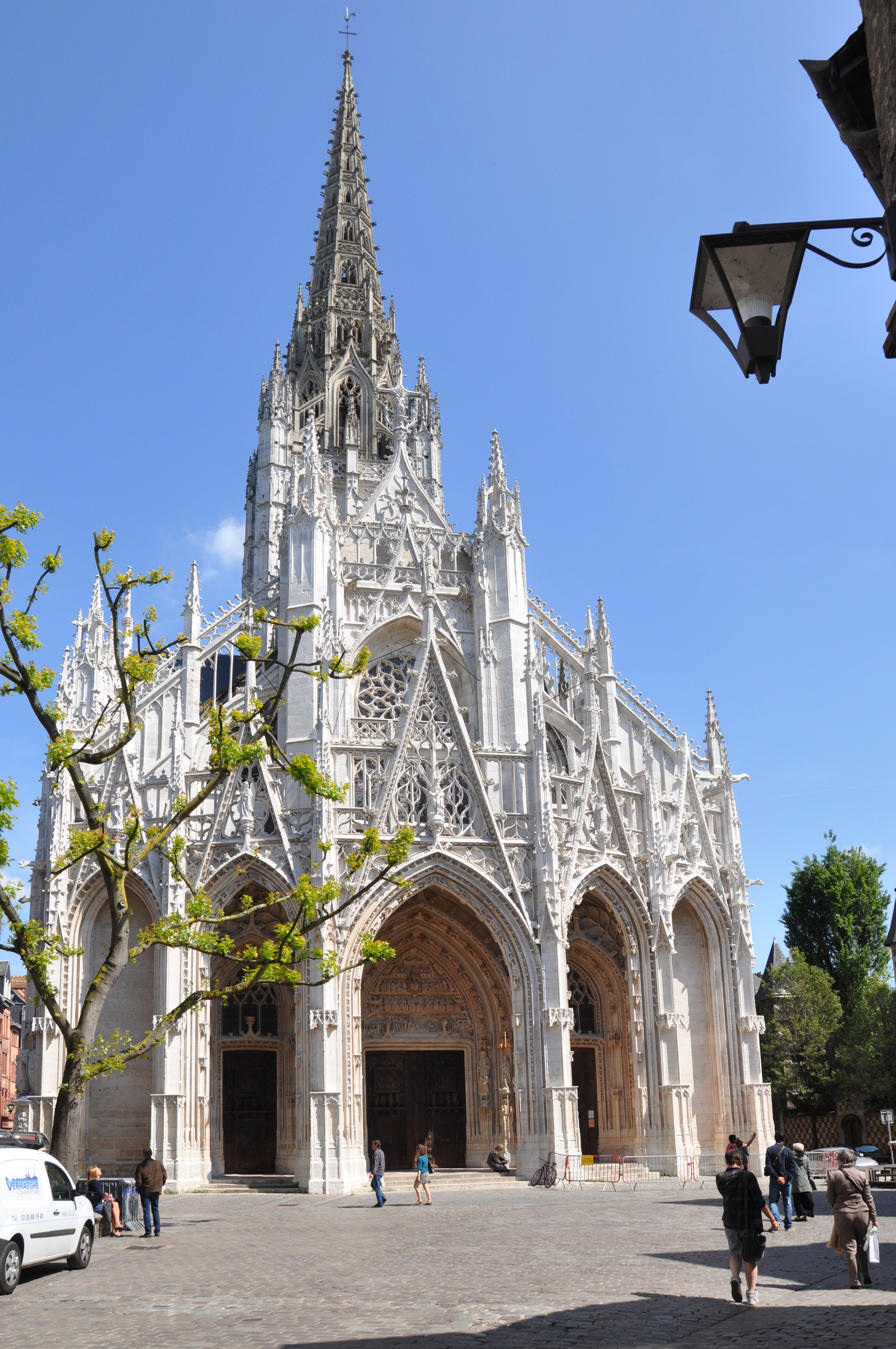
West porch, church of Saint-Maclou, Rouen

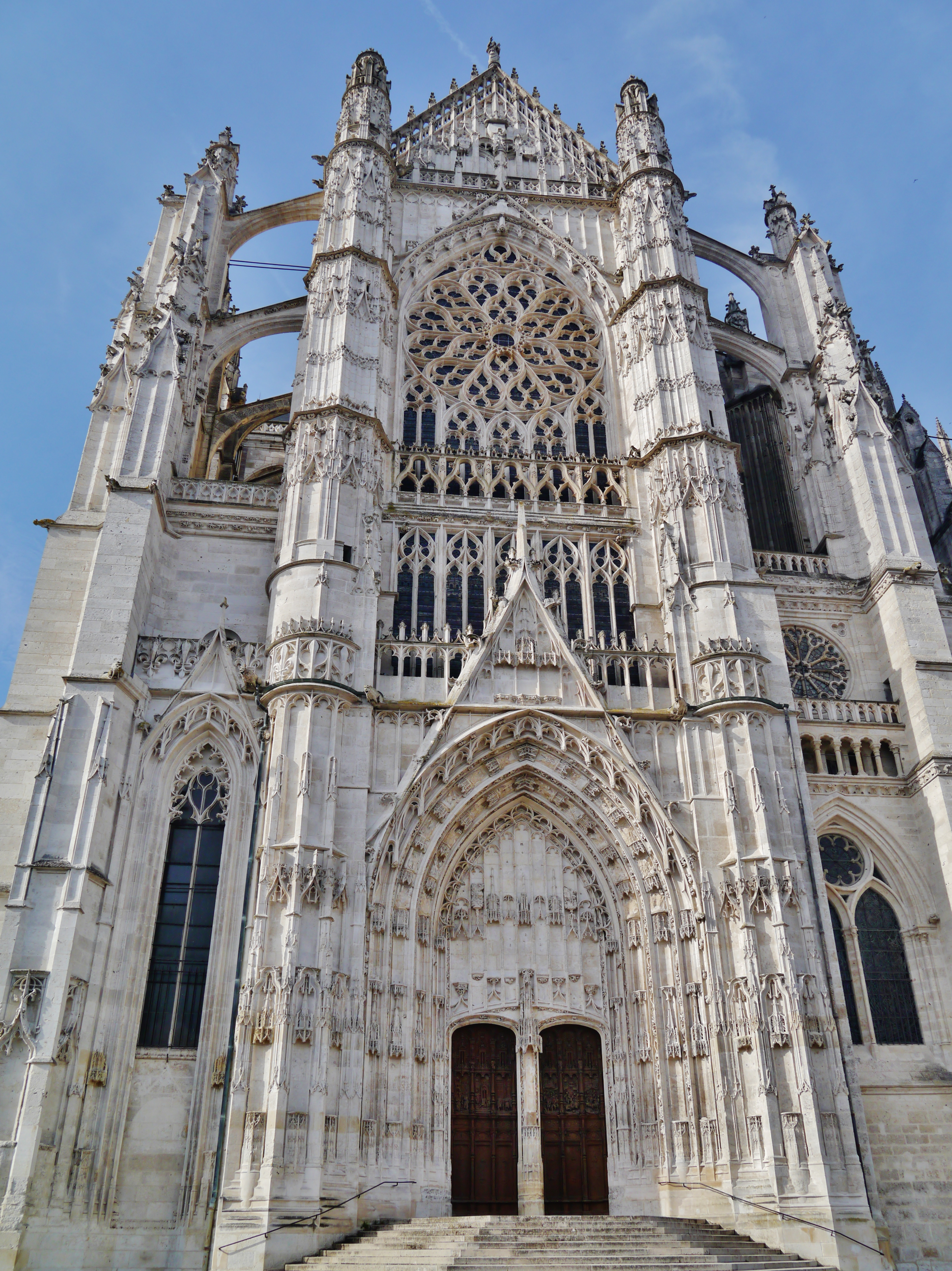
South transept façade, Beauvais Cathedral

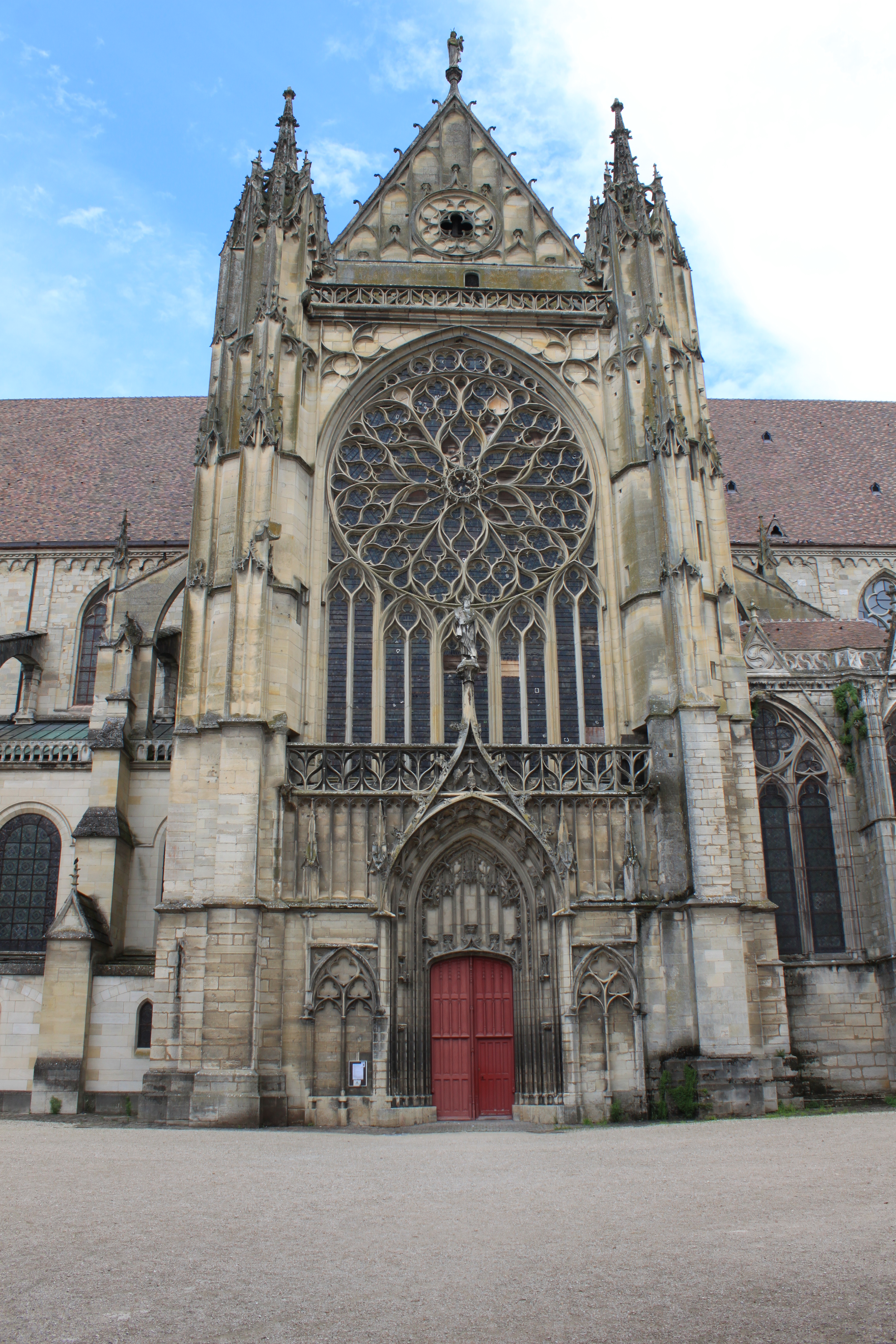
North transept façade, Sens Cathedral

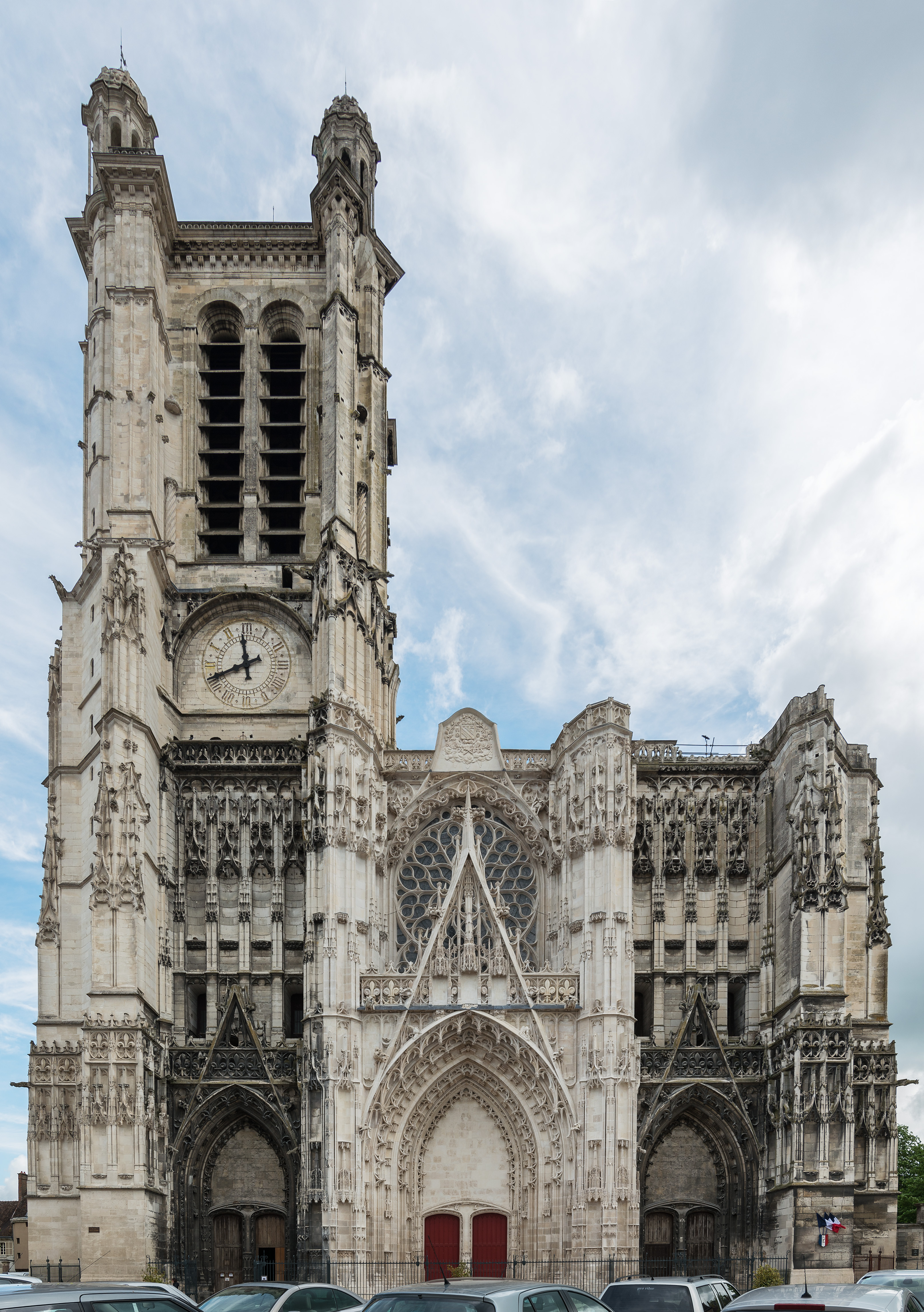
West façade, Troyes Cathedral

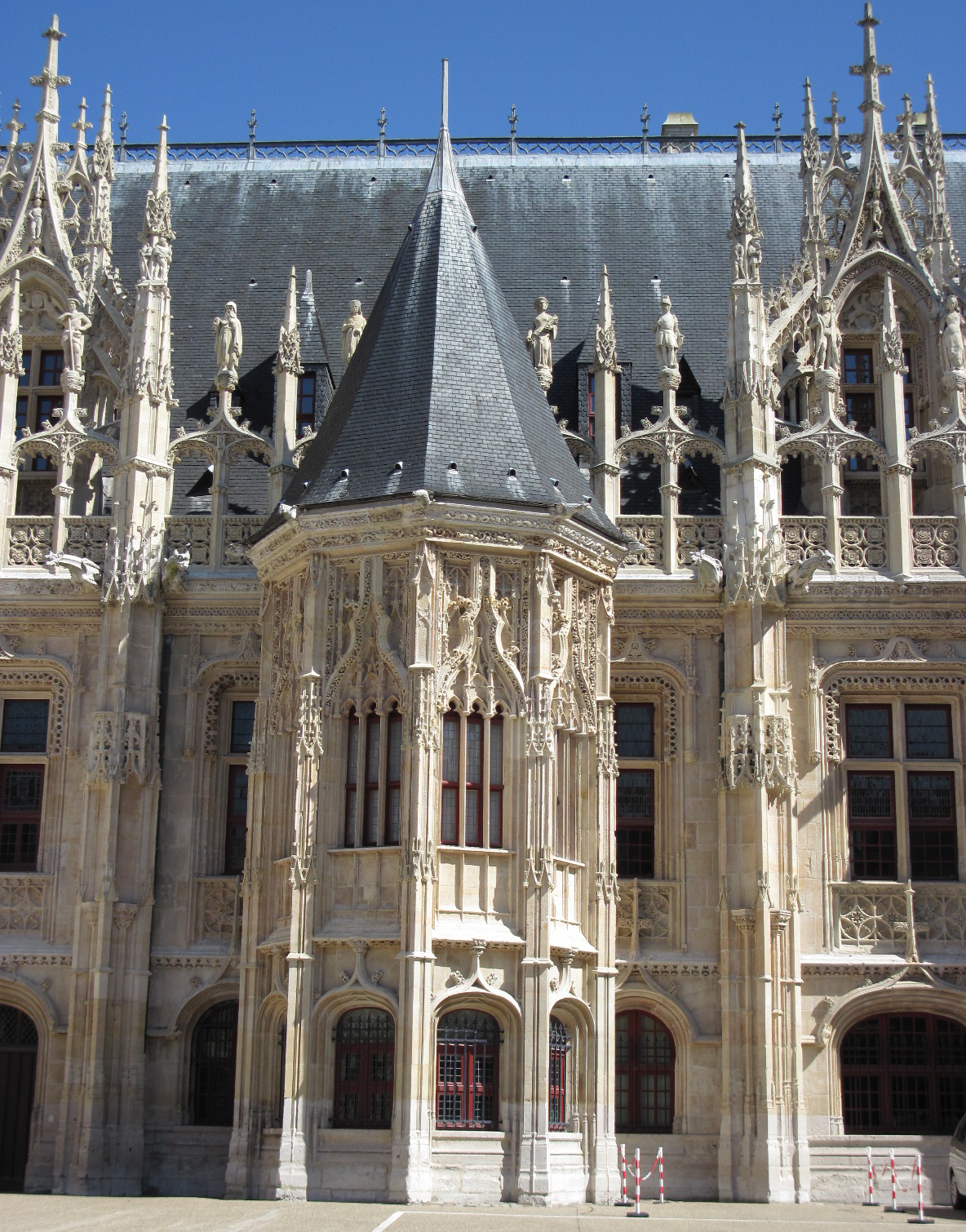
Parlement de Normandie, Rouen, now the Palais de justice

=== Vaults, piers, and mouldings ===
Elision—the elimination of capitals—coupled with the introduction of continuous and "dying" mouldings, are additional noteworthy characteristics of which the parish church of Saint-Maclou in Rouen is a key example. The uninterrupted fluidity and merging of disparate forms led to the emergence of decorative Gothic vaults in France.

Another characteristic feature were vaults with additional types of ribs called the lierne and the tierceron, whose functions were purely decorative. These ribs spread out over the surface to make a star vault; a ceiling of star vaults gave the ceiling a dense network of decoration. Another feature of the period was a type of very tall, round pillar without a capital, from which ribs sprang and spread upwards to the vaults. They were often used as the support for a fan vault, which branched upward like a spreading tree. A fine example is found in the chapel of the Hotel de Cluny in Paris (1485–1510).

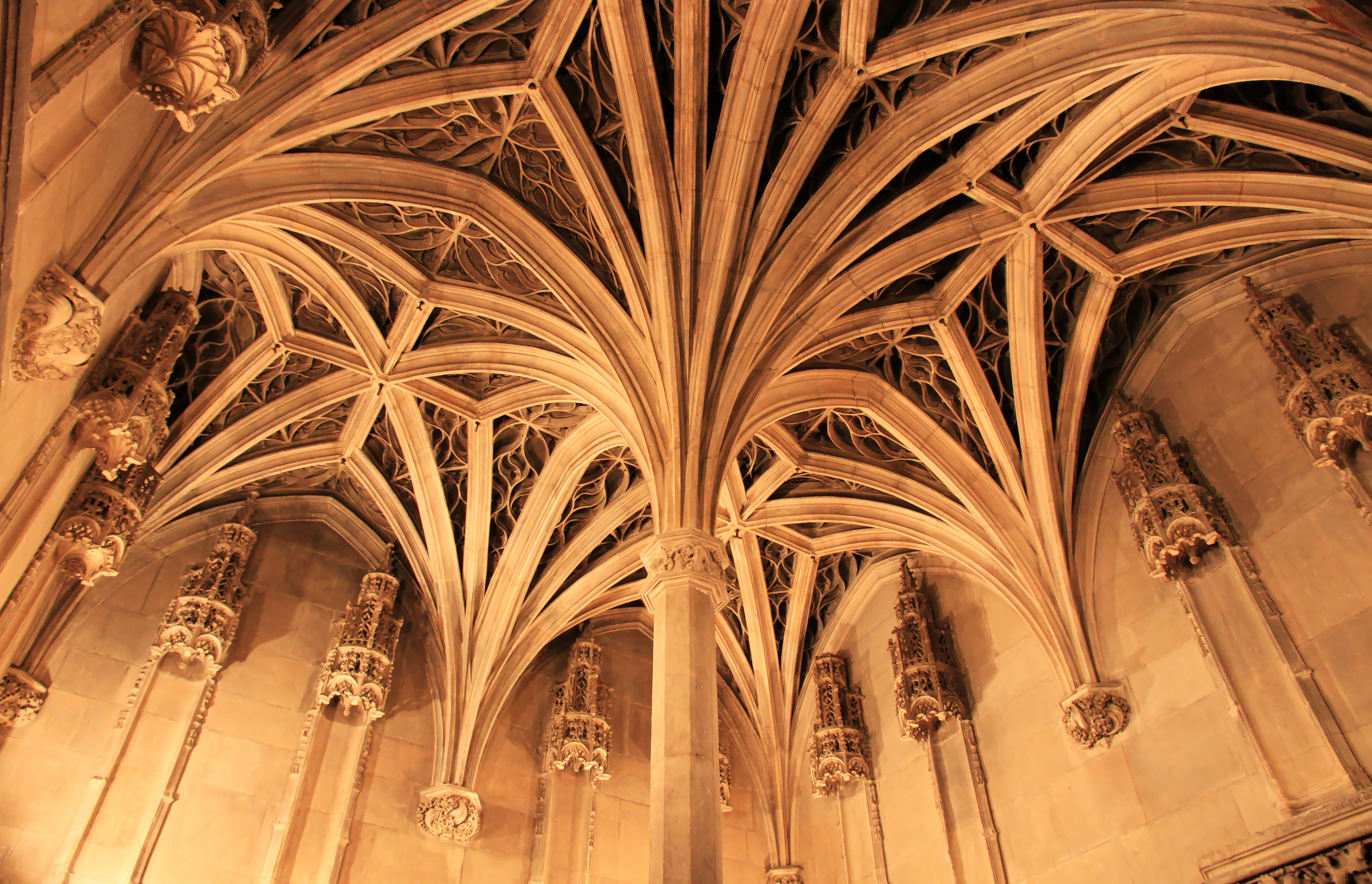
Vaults of the chapel of the Hotel de Cluny (1485–1510)

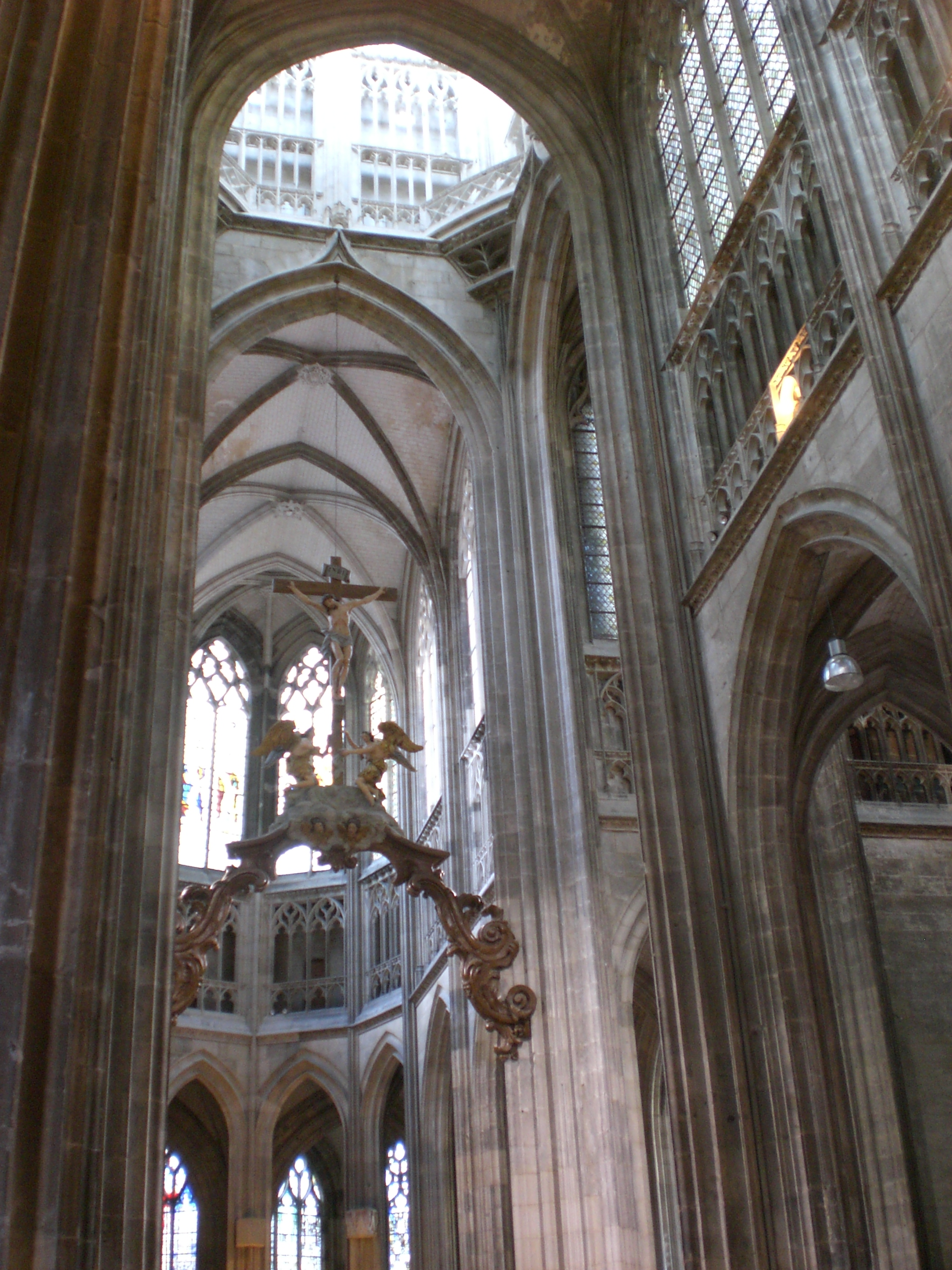
Nave of the church of Saint-Maclou, Rouen Note the absence of capitals and use of continuous mouldings throughout.

Twisted pillar of Church of Saint-Séverin, Paris (1489–1520)

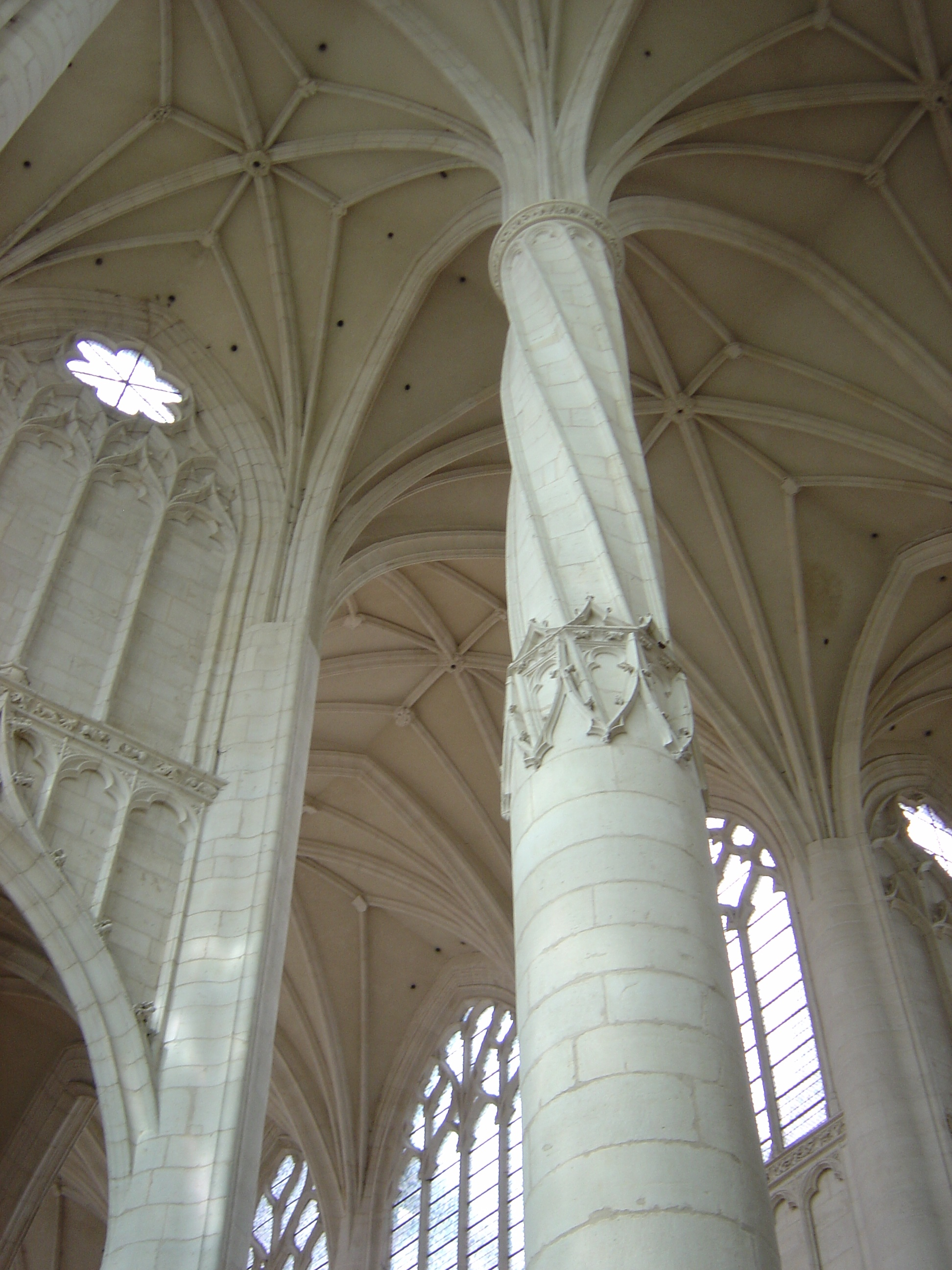
Transept pier and vaults, Basilica of Saint-Nicolas-de-Port

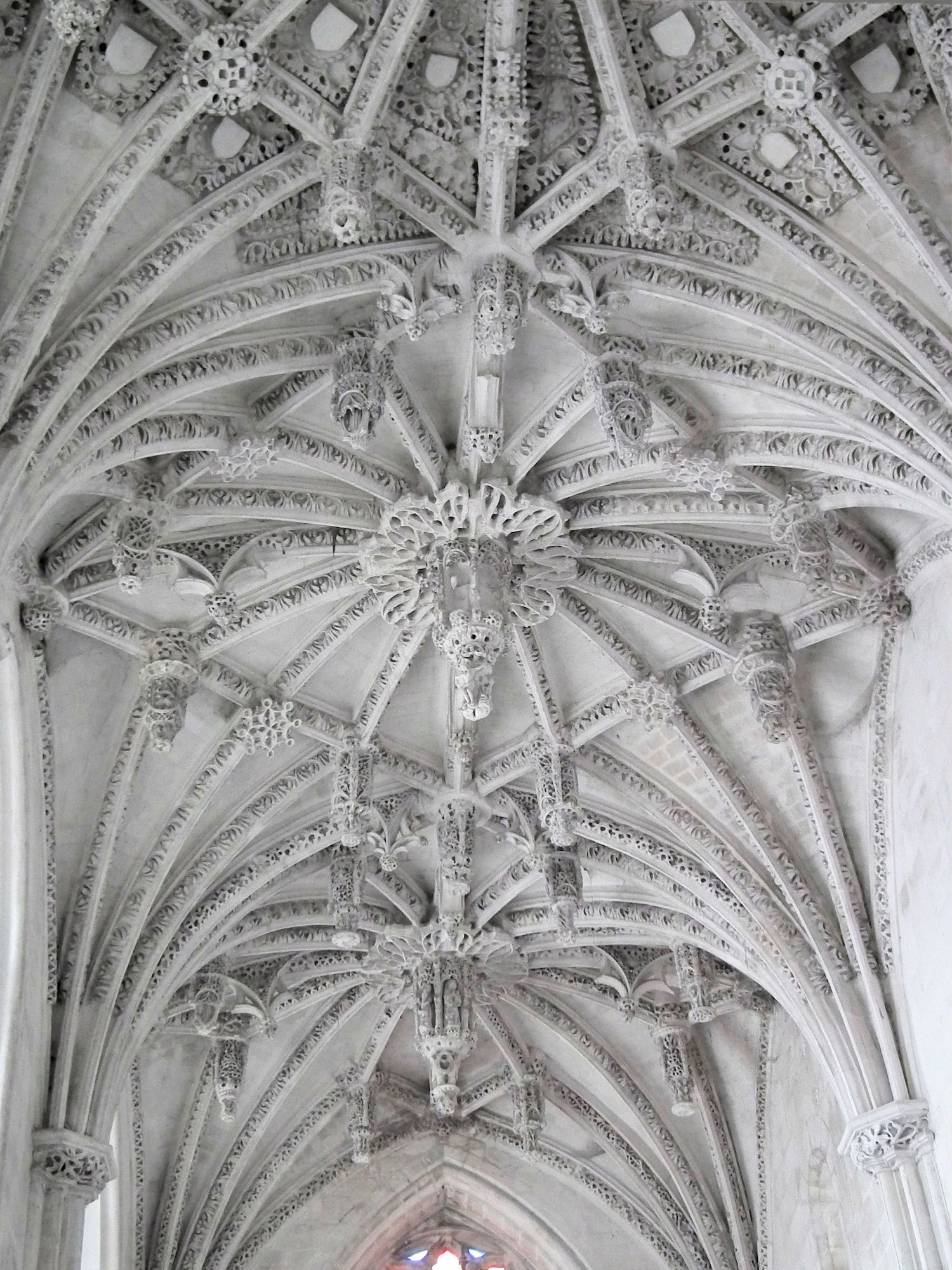
Chapelle du Saint-Esprit, Rue

== Notable examples in France ==
=== Religious architecture ===
- Auch (Gers), Auch Cathedral (except the façade)
- Beauvais (Oise), transept façades of Beauvais Cathedral
- Beauvais (Oise), choir and chapels of the Church of Saint-Étienne de Beauvais
- Bourg-en-Bresse (Ain), Royal Monastery of Brou
- Caudebec-en-Caux (Seine-Maritime), Church of Notre-Dame
- L'Épine (Marne), Notre-Dame de l'Épine
- Évreux (Eure), north transept of Évreux Cathedral
- Louviers (Eure), Notre-Dame de Louviers (north and south façade)
- Nantes (Loire-Atlantique), Nantes Cathedral
- Paris, Church of Saint-Séverin
- Paris, Saint-Jacques Tower, bell tower of the former church of Saint-Jacques de la Boucherie
- Pont-de-l'Arche (Eure), Notre-Dame-des-Arts
- Rouen (Seine-Maritime), Rouen Cathedral (in part)
- Rouen (Seine-Maritime), Church of Saint-Maclou
- Rouen (Seine-Maritime), abbey-church of Saint-Ouen
- Rue (Somme), Chapel of Saint-Esprit
- Saint-Nicolas-de-Port (Meurthe-et-Moselle), Basilica of Saint-Nicolas
- Saint-Riquier (Somme), Abbey
- Senlis (Oise), transepts of Senlis Cathedral
- Sens (Yonne), Sens Cathedral (south transept)
- Thann (Haut-Rhin), St Theobald's Church
- Toul (Meurthe-et-Moselle), west façade of Toul Cathedral
- Tours (Indre-et-Loir), Tours Cathedral (west façade)
- Vendôme (Loir-et-Cher), west façade of the Abbaye de la Trinité
- Vincennes (Val-de-Marne), Sainte-Chapelle

=== Civil architecture ===
- Beaune (Côte-d'Or), hospices
- Beauvais (Oise), former episcopal palace
- Bourges (Cher), Palais Jacques Cœur
- Château de Châteaudun (Eure-et-Loir)
- Paris, Hôtel de Cluny
- Paris, Hôtel de Sens
- Rouen (Seine-Maritime), Palais de Justice

== Notable examples outside France ==
- St. Lorenz, Nuremberg (nave ceiling in particular), Germany
- Milan Cathedral, a relatively rare Italian building in the style, which is adopted very fully here
- Vladislav Hall in Prague Castle (vaults), Czech Republic
- Seville Cathedral, Spain
- Capella de Sant Jordi, Palau de la Generalitat de Catalunya, Barcelona, Spain
- Batalha Monastery, Portugal
- Brussels Town Hall, Belgium
- Church of St. Anne, Vilnius, Lithuania
- St. Barbara's Church, Kutná Hora, Czech Republic

== Gallery ==
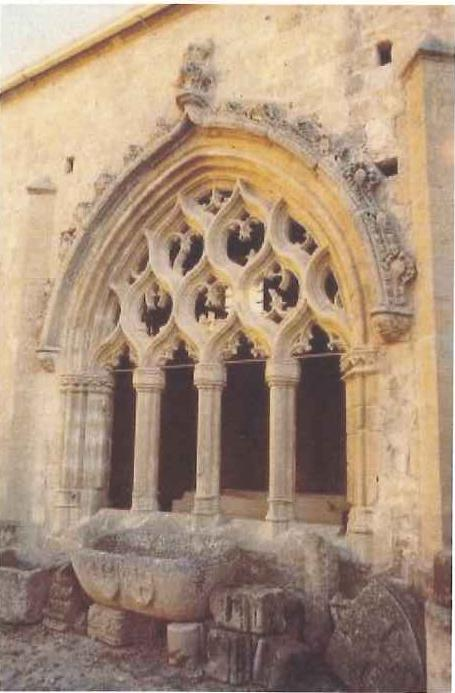
Flamboyant window from the last surviving Lusignan palace in Nicosia

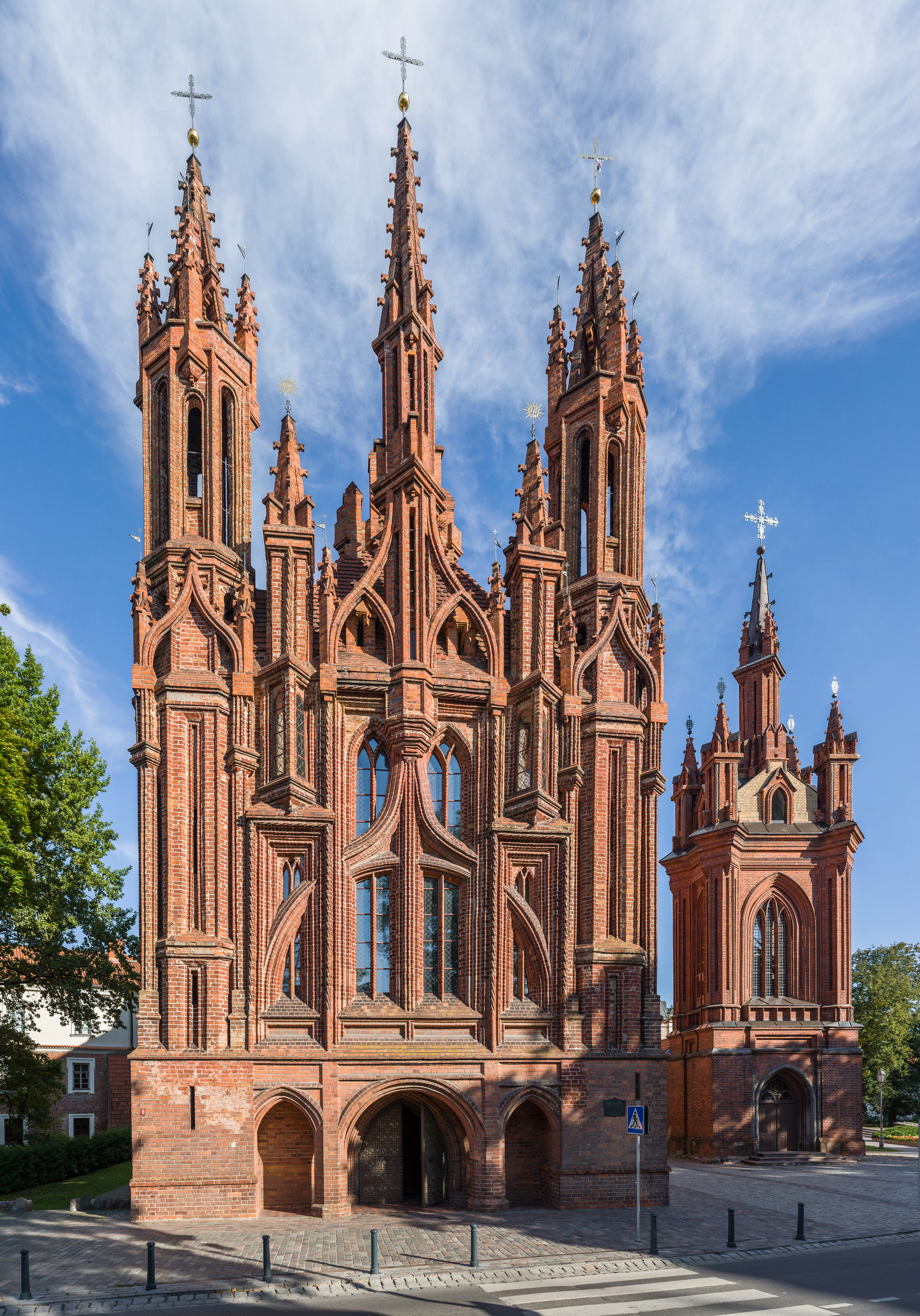
St Anne's, Vilnius, Lithuania (1500)

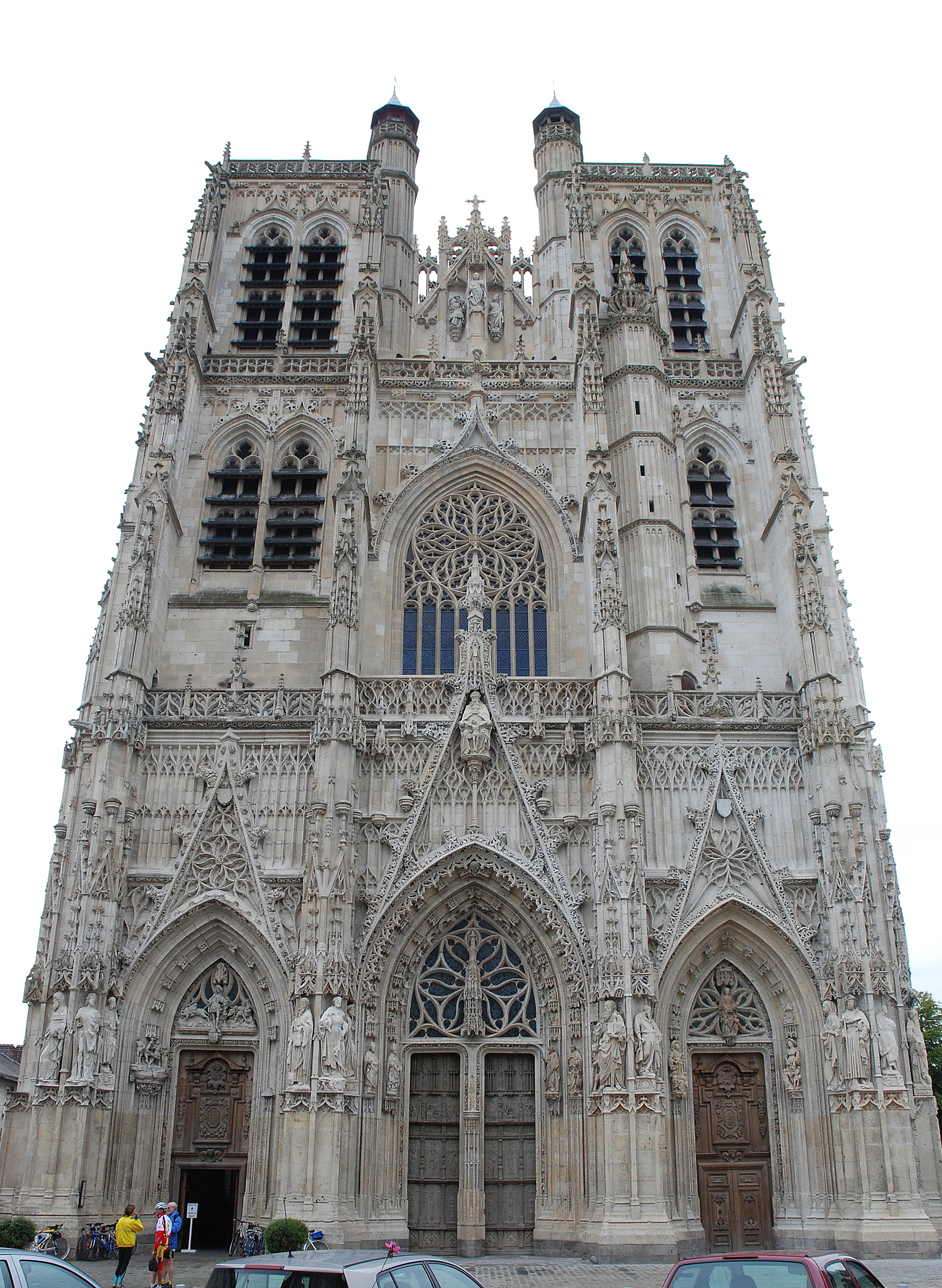
St. Vulfran Collegiate Church, west façade, Abbeville

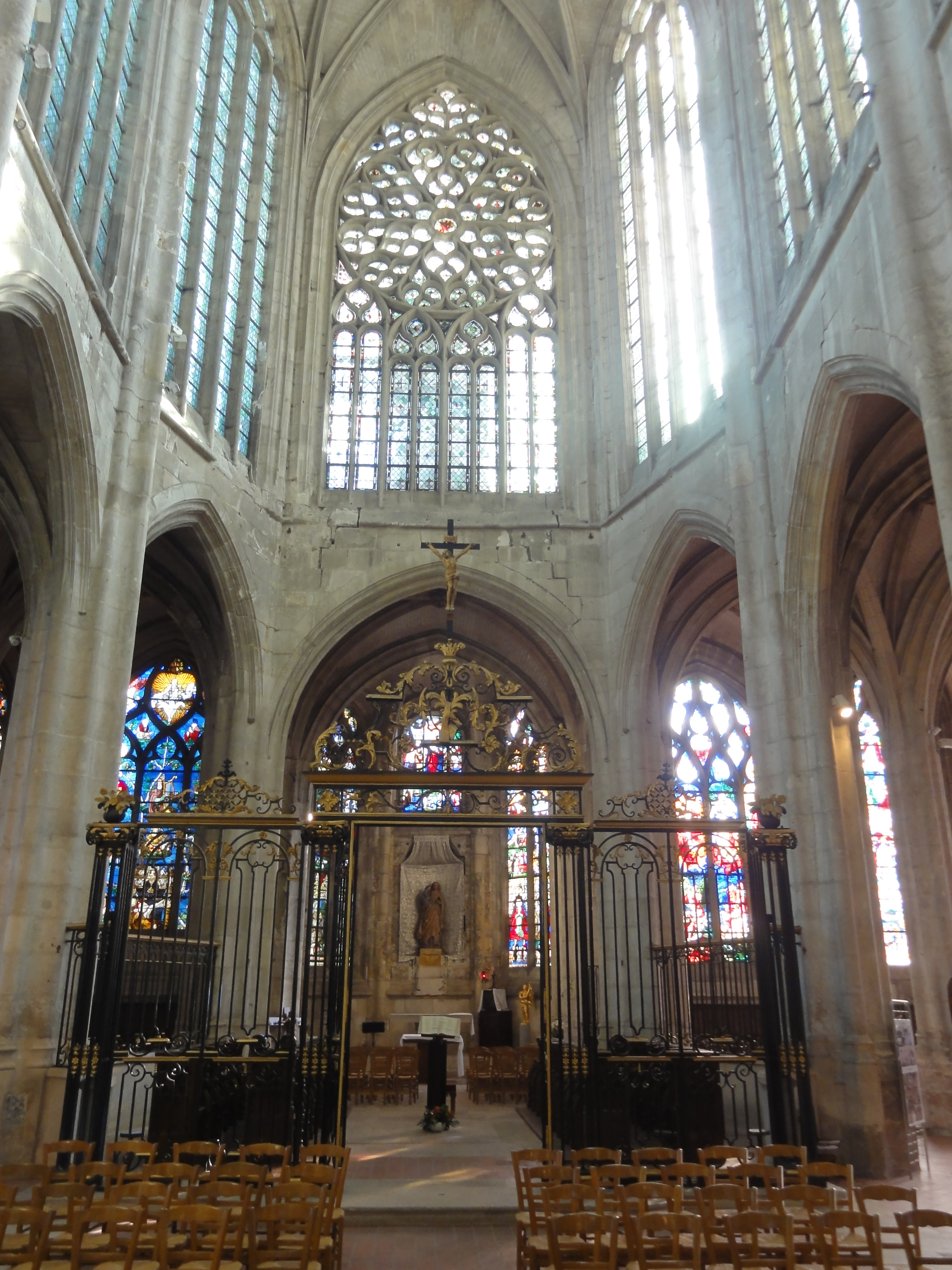
Church of Saint-Étienne, interior, chevet, Beauvais

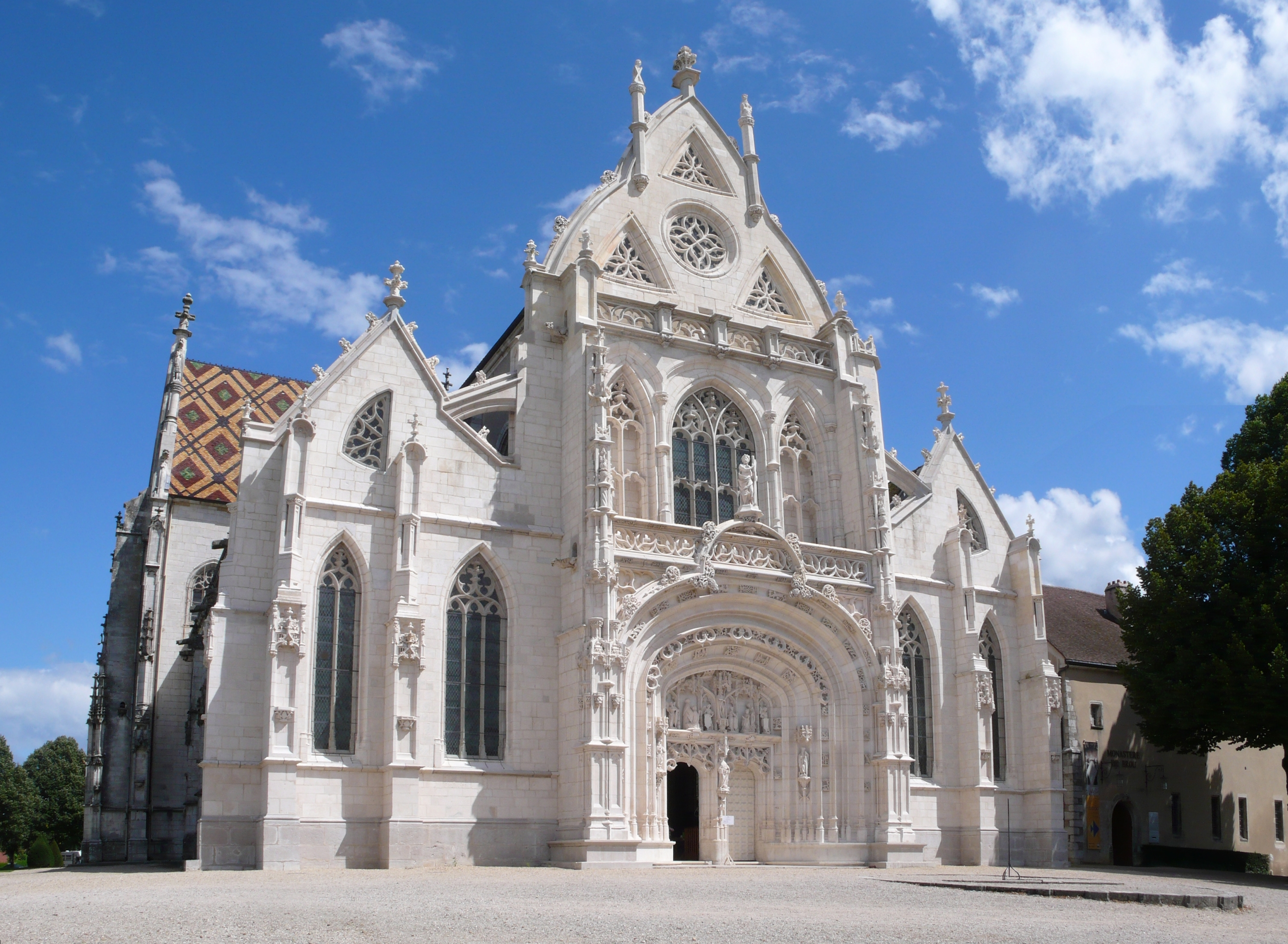
Royal Monastery of Brou, Bourg-en-Bresse

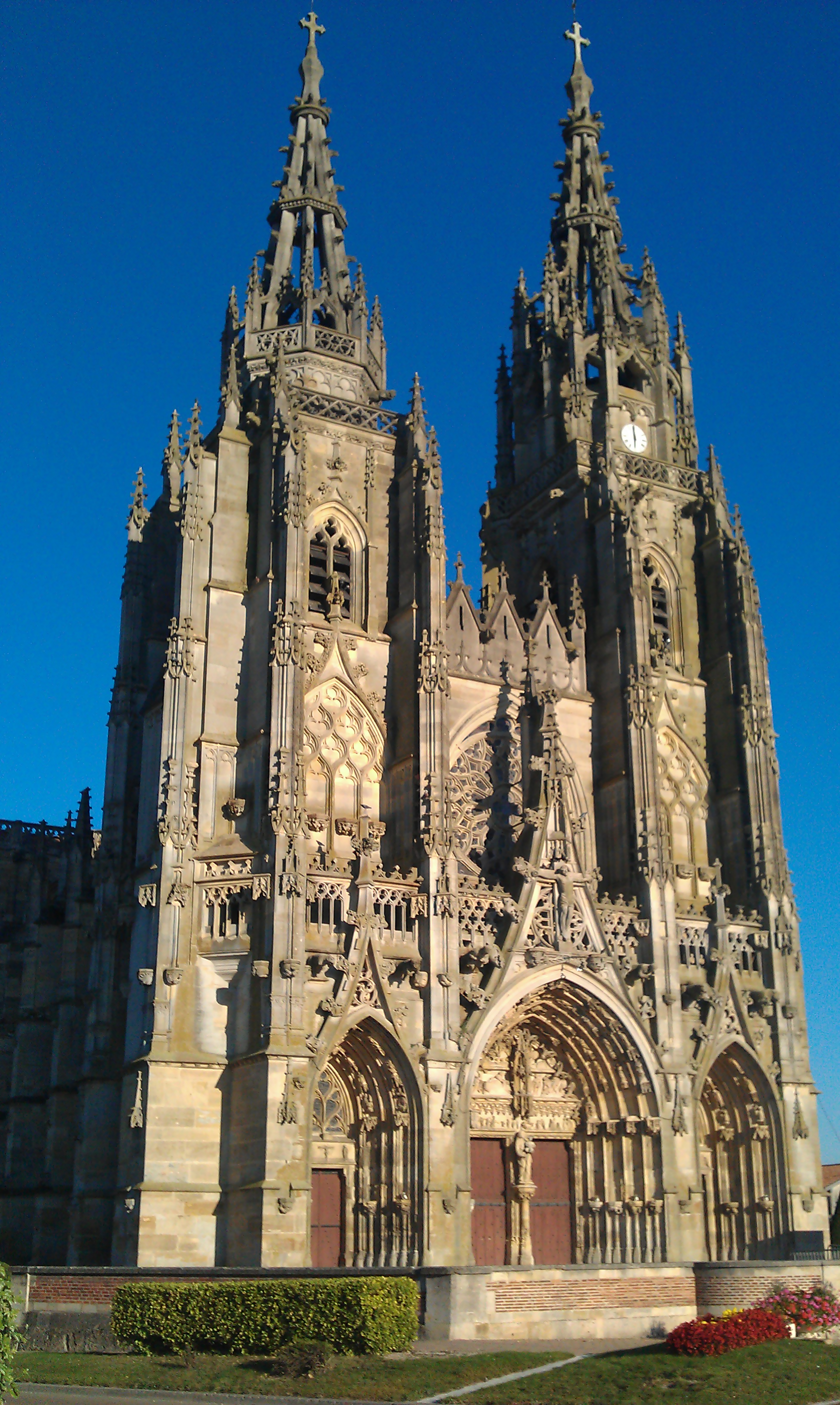
Notre-Dame de l'Épine, west façade, L'Épine

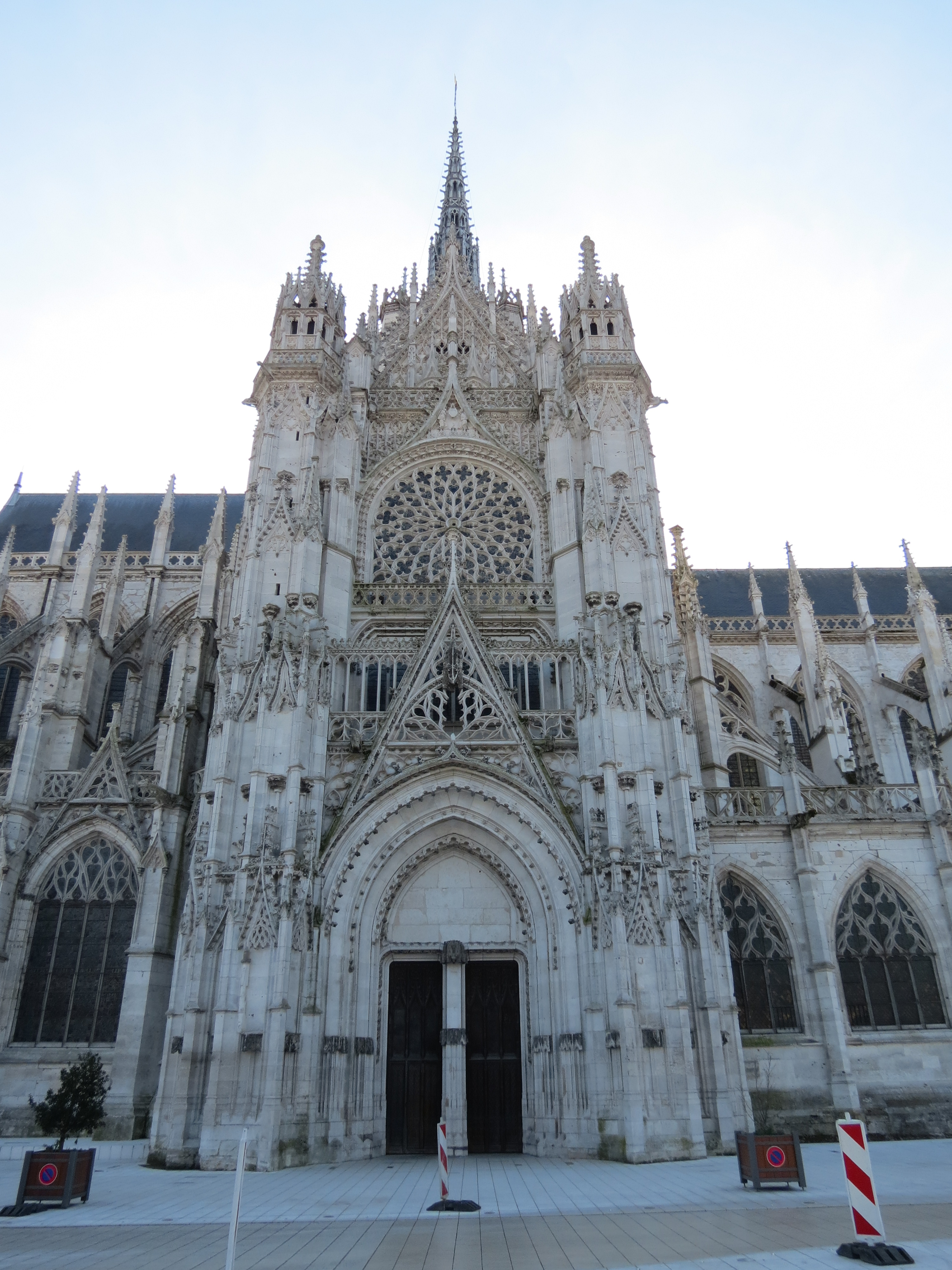
Évreux Cathedral, north transept façade, Évreux

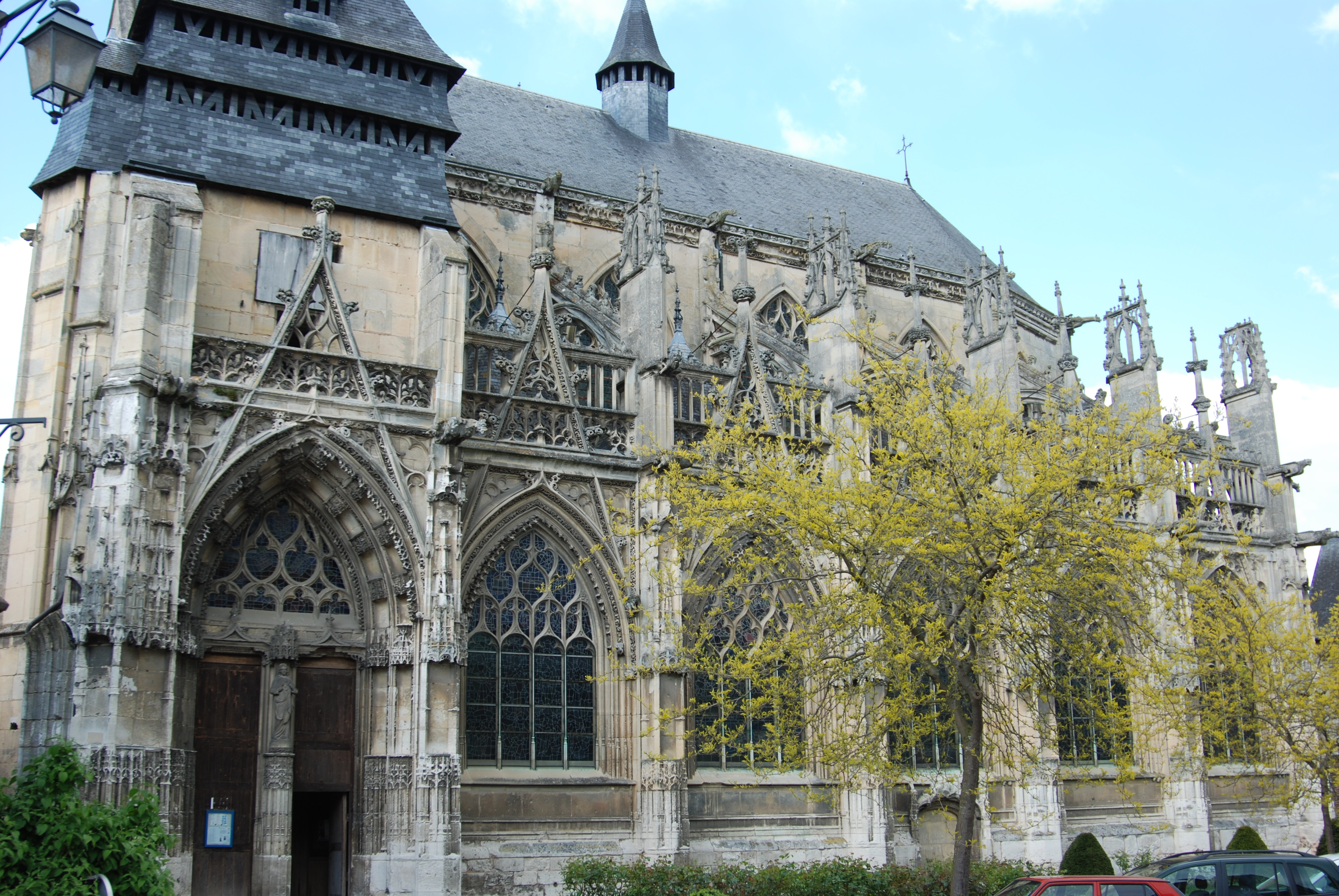
Notre-Dame-des-Arts, Pont-de-l'Arche

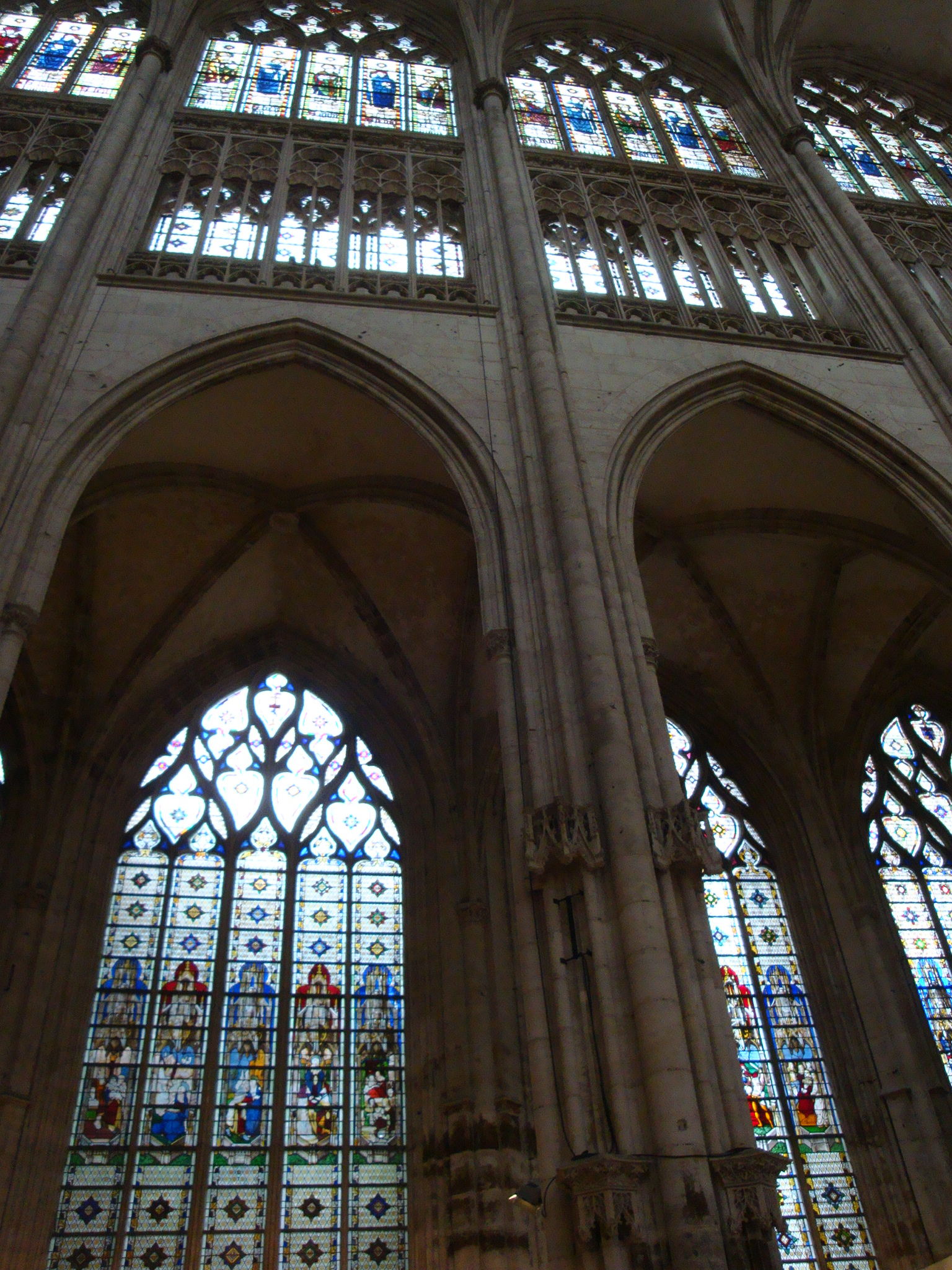
Abbey-church of St. Ouen, nave elevation, Rouen

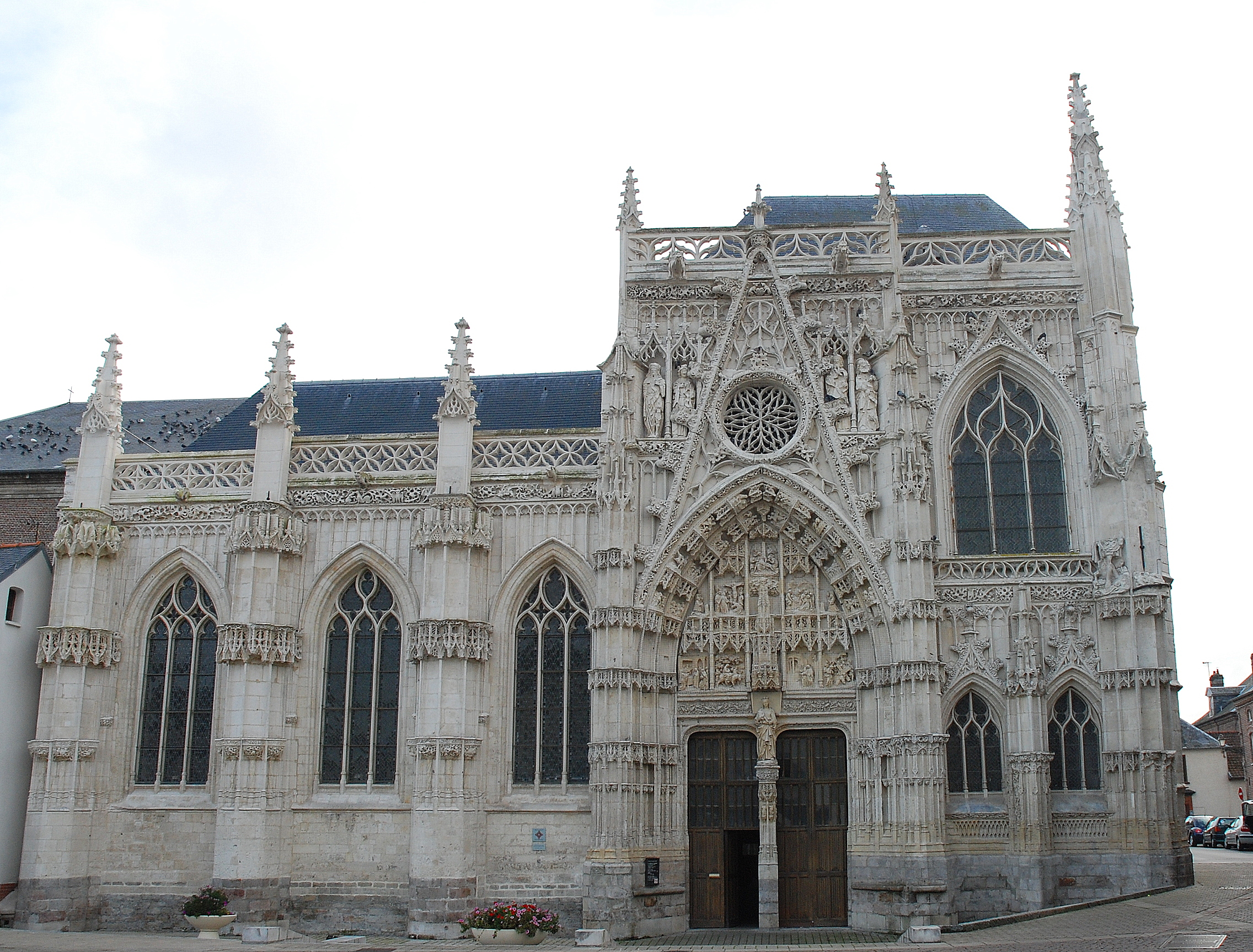
Chapel of Saint-Esprit, Rue

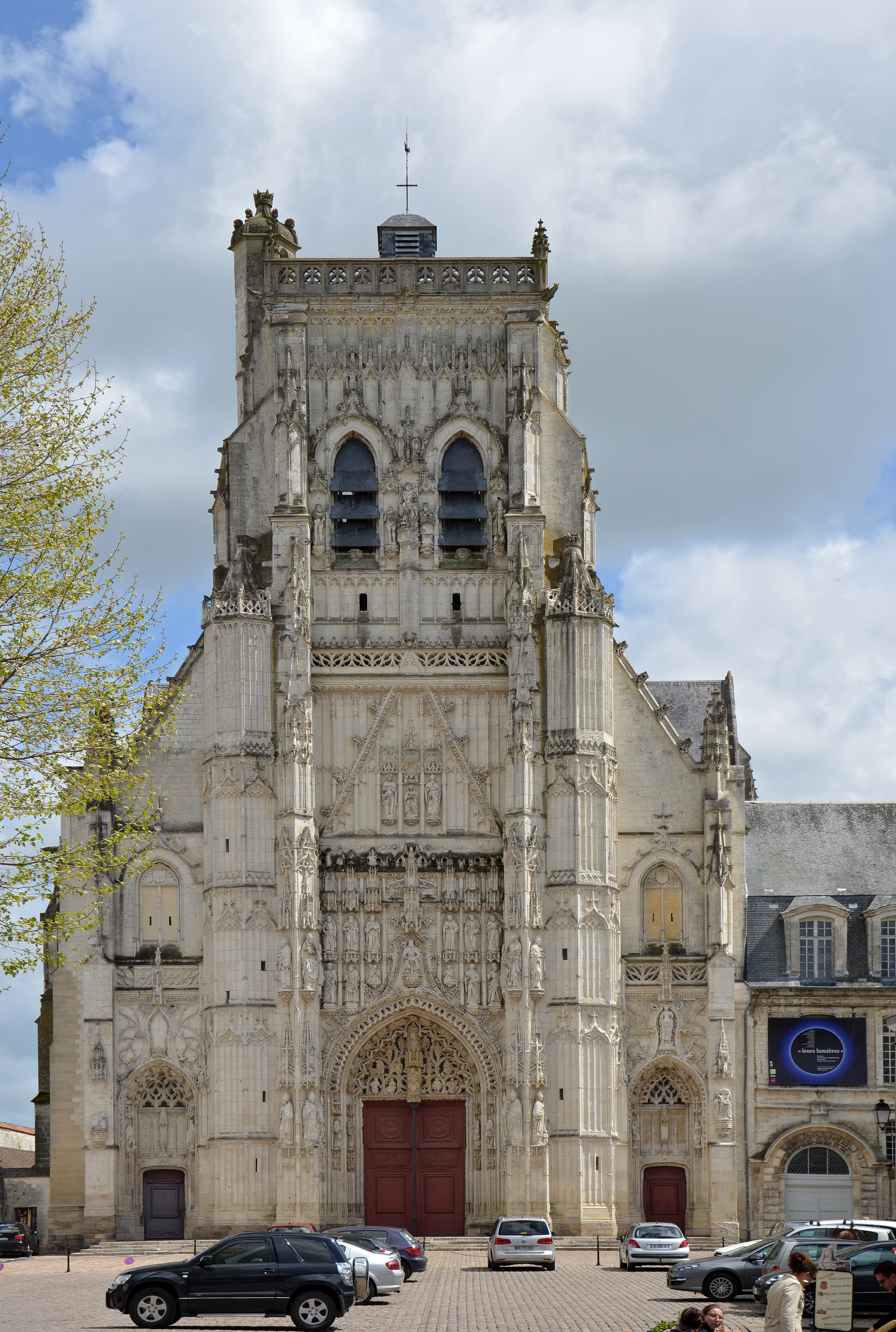
Abbey, Saint-Riquier

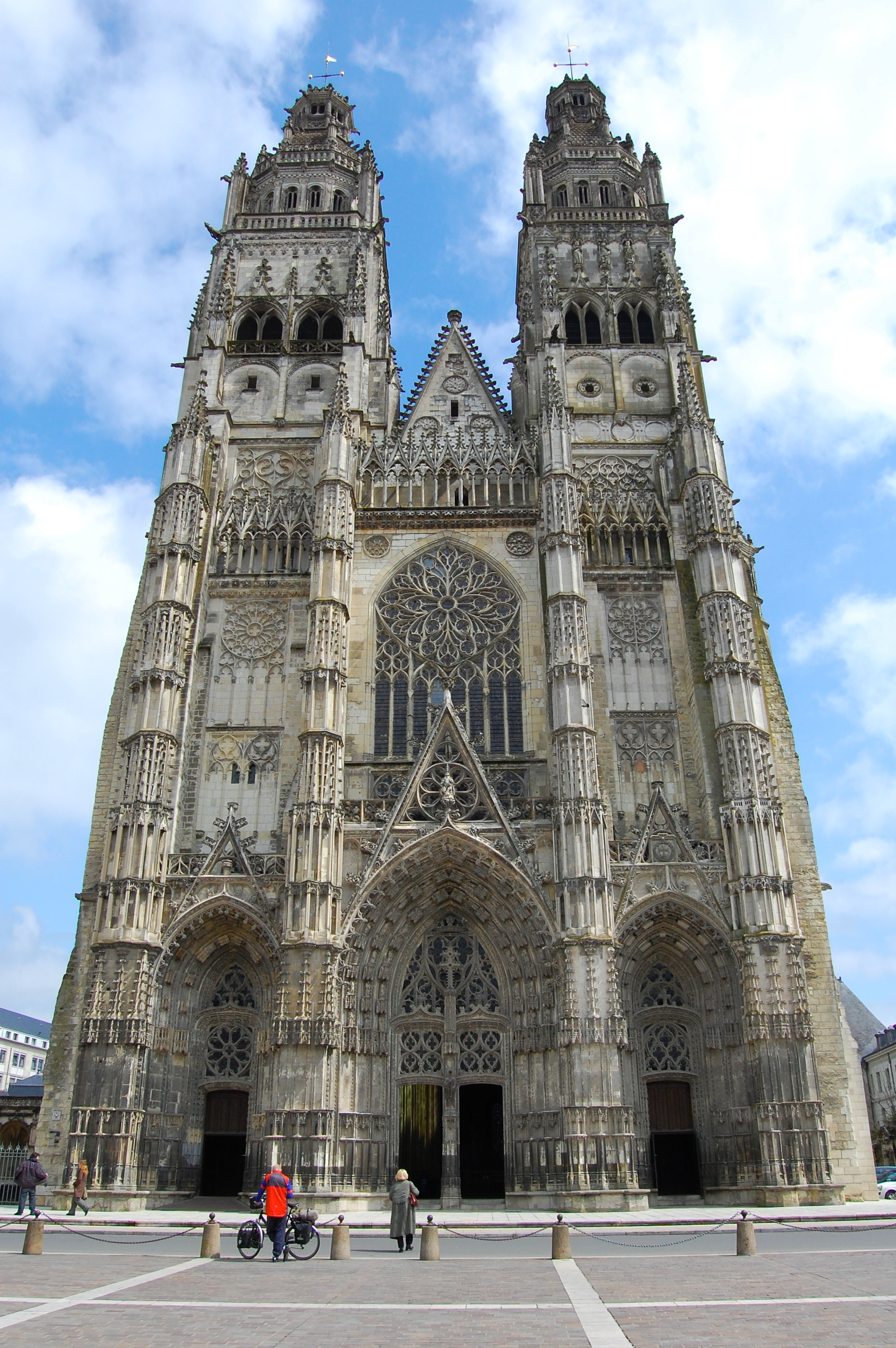
West façade of Tours Cathedral (towers completed 1547)

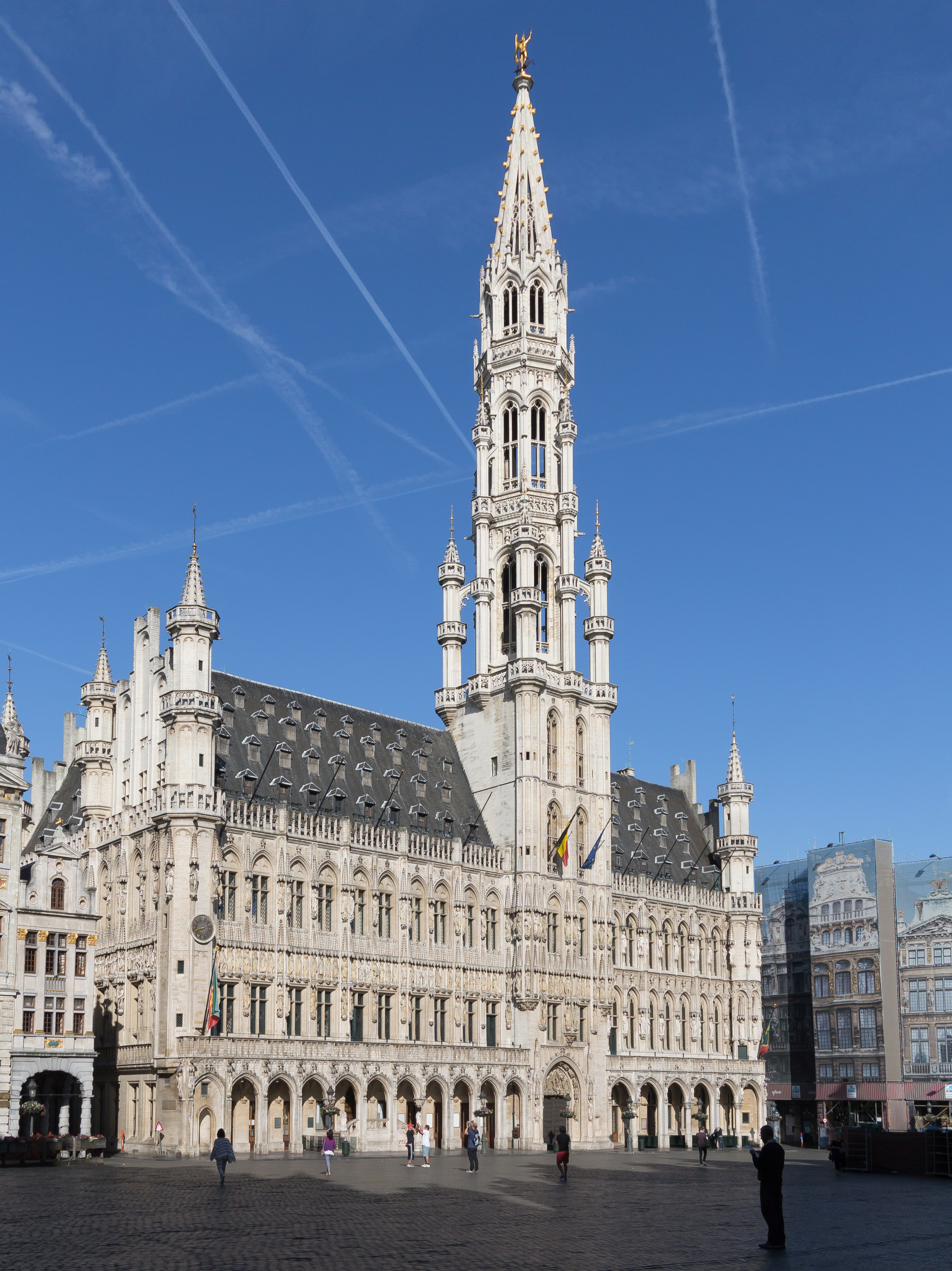
Brussels Town Hall, Belgium

== See also ==
- French Gothic architecture
- Gothic cathedrals and churches
- High Gothic
- International Gothic
- Rayonnant
