= Church of Notre-Dame-des-Arts =

Church located in Eure, France

Notre-Dame-des-Arts
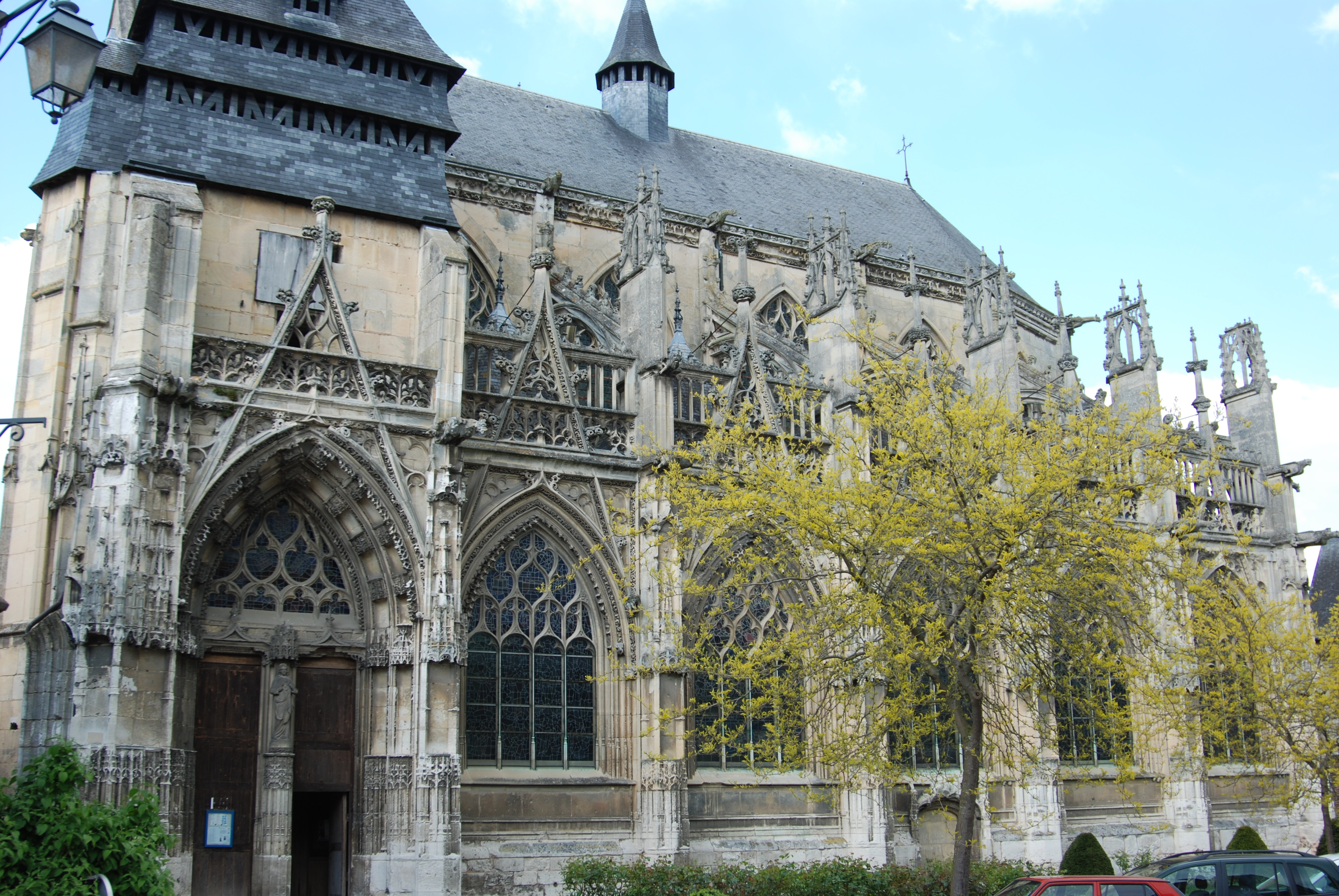
- Notre-Dame-des-Arts, south façade

Religion
- Affiliation: Catholic Church
- Province: Archdiocese of Rouen
- Region: Upper Normandy
- Rite: Roman Rite
- Status: Active

Location
- State: France
- Interactive map of Notre-Dame-des-Arts
- Coordinates: 48°18′19″N 1°09′19″E

Architecture
- Type: church
- Style: French Gothic
- Groundbreaking: c. 1500
- Completed: 1564
- Monument historique
- Official name: Notre-Dame-des-Arts
- Designated: 1910
- Reference no.: PA00099520
- Denomination: Église

Website
- www.paroissestpierre2rives.fr

The Church of Notre-Dame-des-Arts (Église Notre-Dame-des-Arts) is a Roman Catholic church in Eure, Upper Normandy, France. It was founded in Pont-de-l'Arche at the outset of the sixteenth century. A parish church, Notre-Dame-des-Arts is richly decorated, with splendid stained glass windows on the south side, dating to the early seventeenth century, including a renowned original work by Martin Vérel depicting boats being towed (1605). The stalls from Bonport Abbey, the great organ, a gift from Henry IV of France, and a Baroque seventeenth-century altar all further contribute to the richness of the building.

== Chronological overview of Notre-Dame-des-Arts ==
Many of the dates were recorded in the parish fabric accounts; however, these accounts—or at least their transcriptions—likely date to the seventeenth century. The accounts state first that stone was purchased for construction beginning circa 1499-1500. A new chapel was begun in 1501. By 1509 the north nave aisle was completed. Construction progressed on a piecemeal basis through the mid sixteenth century; the nave was probably vaulted by 1543. The vaults and superstructure of the south nave aisle were completed between 1555 and 1558.

== Plan ==
The plan is streamlined though somewhat irregular. A nave of six bays is flanked to the north and south by aisles. The east end terminates in a massive, projecting polygonal chapel. There is no typical Gothic west façade or transept; entrance to the interior is through the single portal in the southwest corner of the edifice. The interior is oriented towards the massive eastern chapel while the south flank serves as the principal façade.

== Elevation ==
The interior elevation is very sober like many of the Flamboyant Gothic churches in the region. It consists of two stories: nave arcade and clerestory. The clerestory windows feature dynamic tracery patterns largely composed of mouchettes and soufflets. The nave vaults contrast with the otherwise conservative articulation. These vaults spring from thin continuous moldings before diverging into tiercerons, liernes, and transverse ribs. The north and south aisles feature quadripartite vaults with large pendant keystones. The nave arcade piers all differ from one another, though those on the south side feature tall (c. 5 feet) prismatic bases and continuous moldings.

== South façade ==
The south façade faces the town while the north closely abutted a large defensive wall. Not surprisingly, this southern façade received the most attention from the architect and sculptors. Indeed, it is richly adorned and features intricate stone carving. Dramatic, steeply pitched gables intersect a tall balustrade, creating an openwork screen of sinuous stonework. It has been suggested the design recalls the articulation and decoration of the west façade of the highly-influential parish church of Saint-Maclou in Rouen.

== Significance ==
The design and ornamentation of the south façade is contemporary with other similar construction projects nearby, including the south façade and porch of the parish church of Notre-Dame at Louviers and the south façade of the collegiate church of Notre-Dame at Les Andelys. Together with these monuments, it is a good example of late Flamboyant church construction in the Seine valley between Rouen and Gaillon at the end of the Middle Ages. The south façade of Notre-Dame-des-Arts, while not as complex as Notre-Dame at Louviers, represents a significant investment and was reflective of the return to prosperity in Pont-de-l'Arche after the end of the Hundred Years War.

== Gallery ==
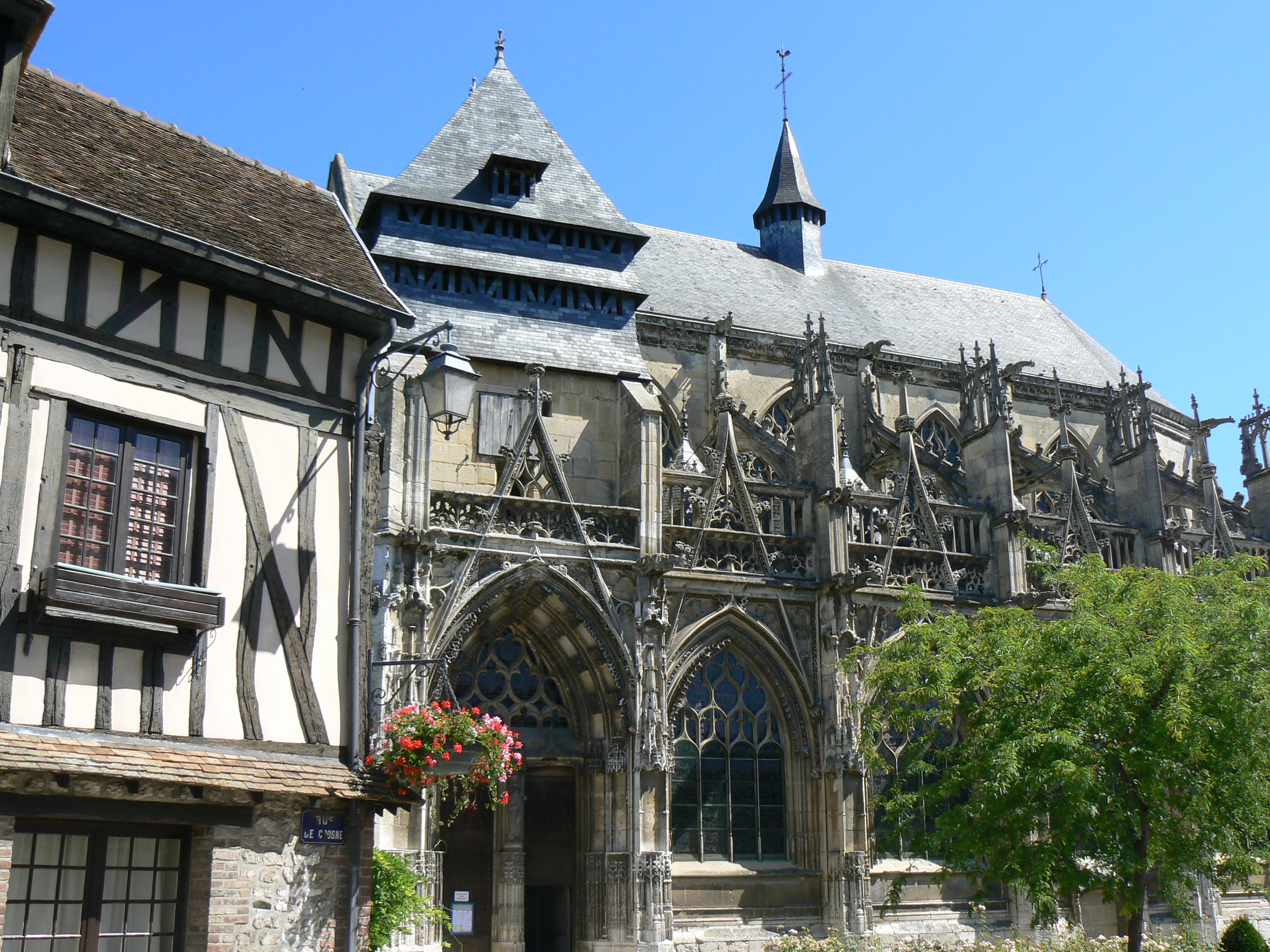
South façade

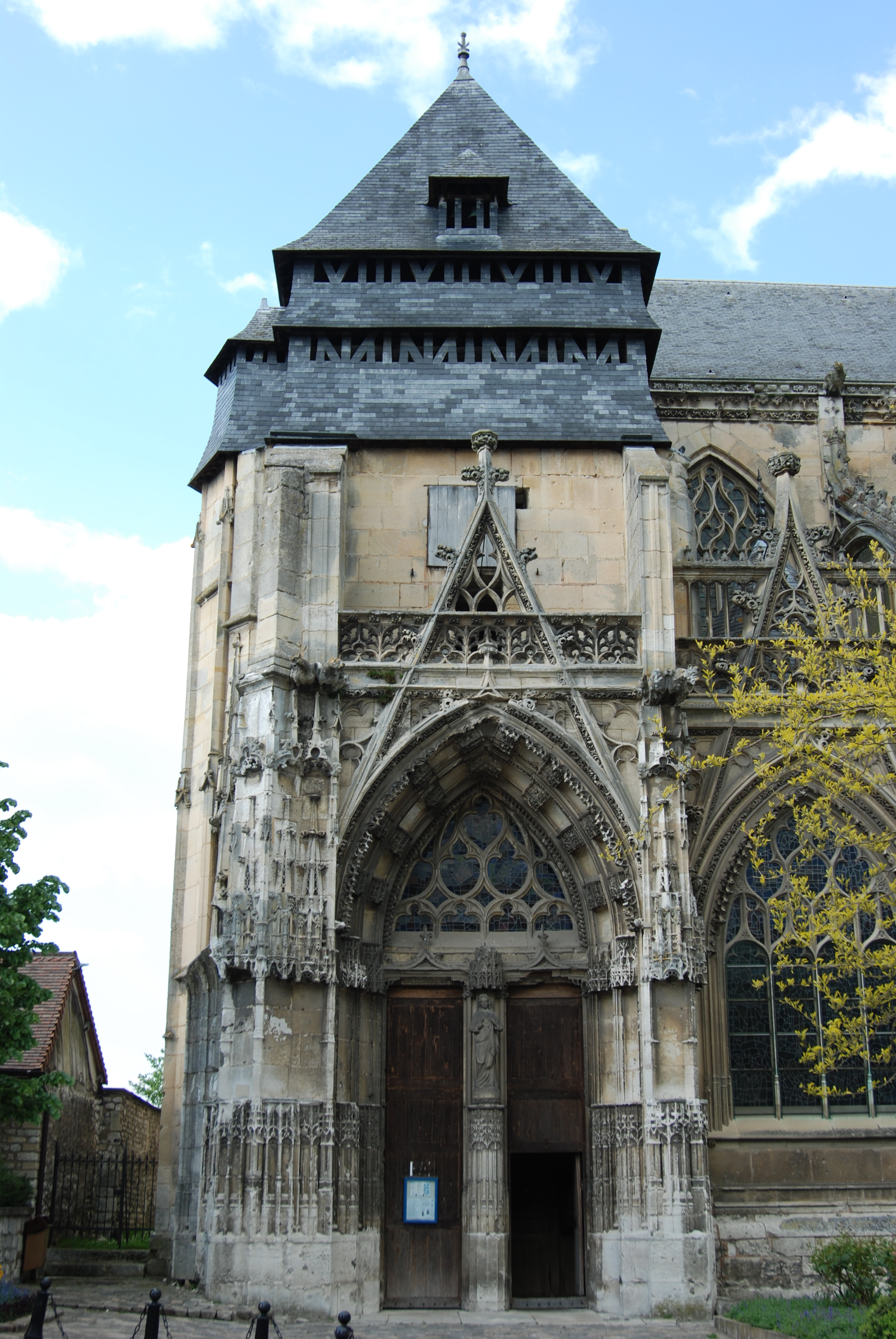
South portal

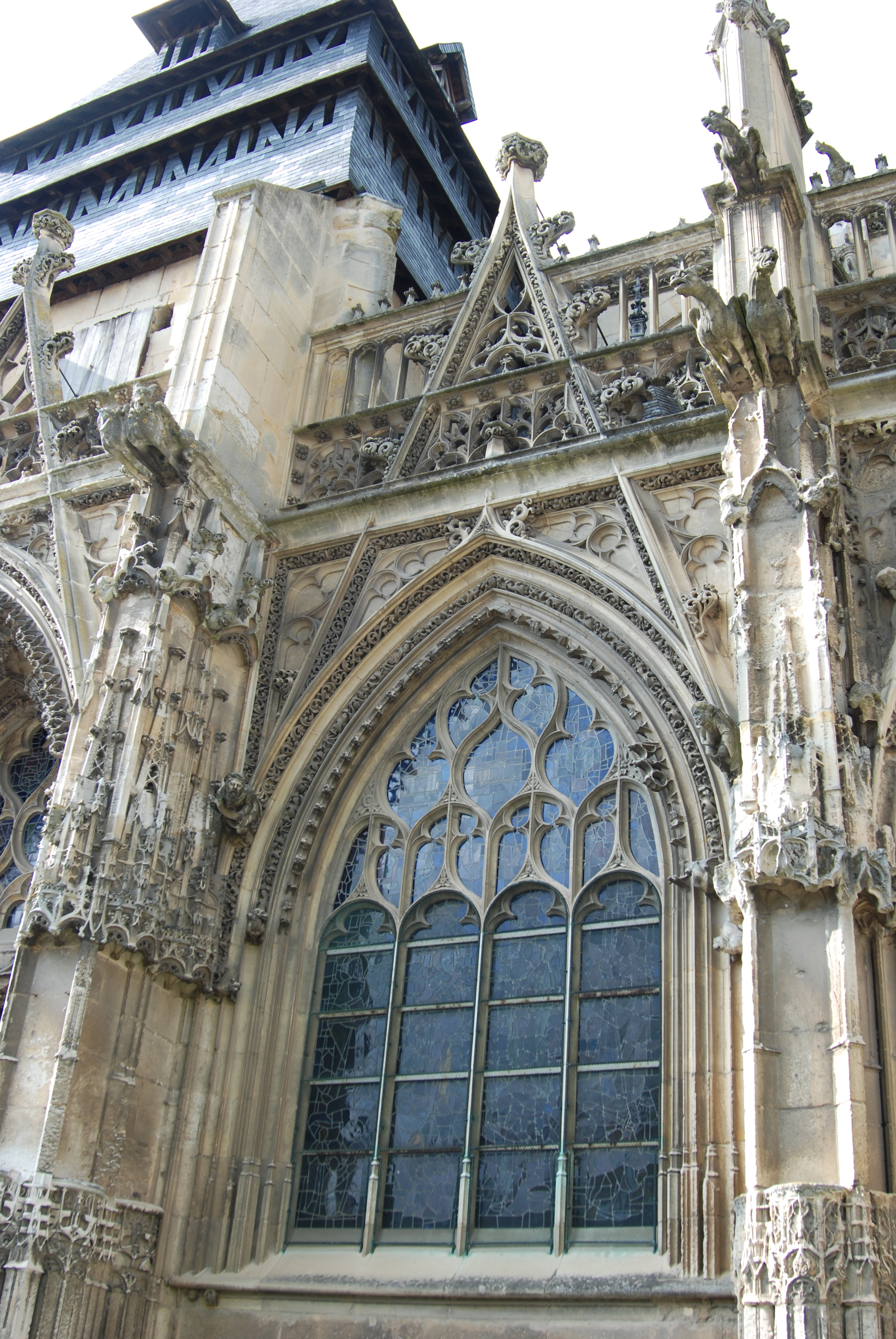
Detail, south façade

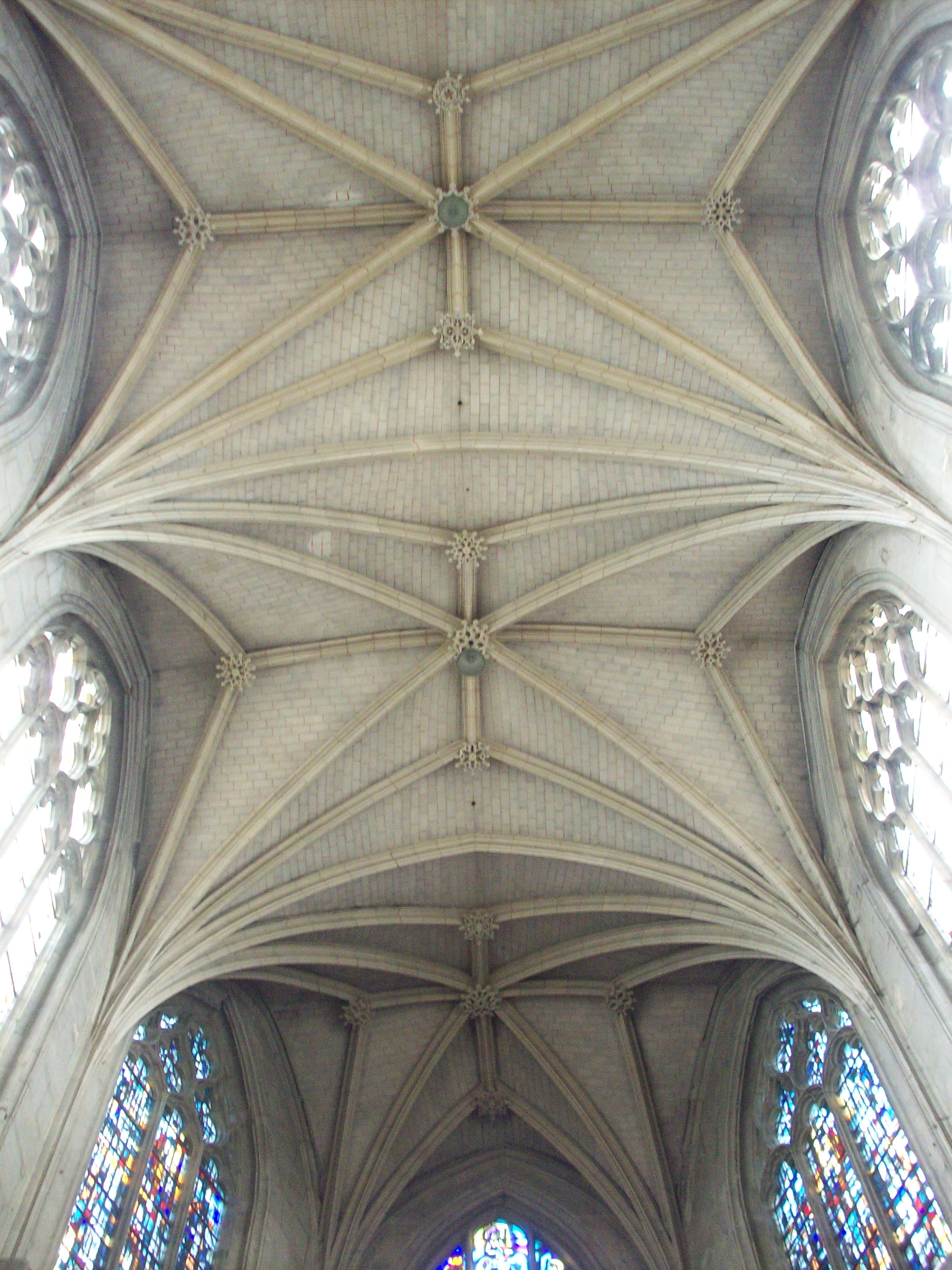
Nave vault

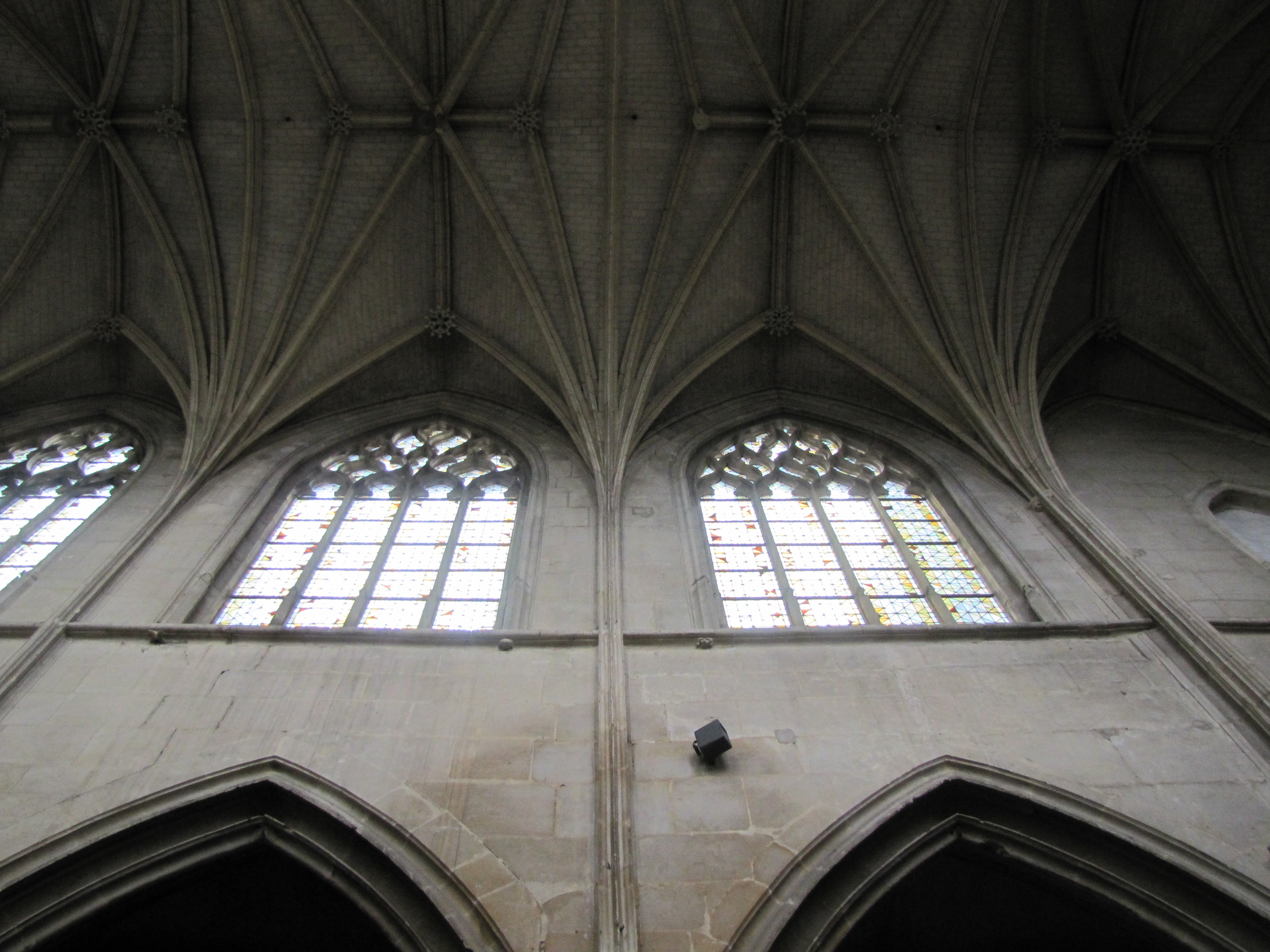
Nave clerestory with vaults

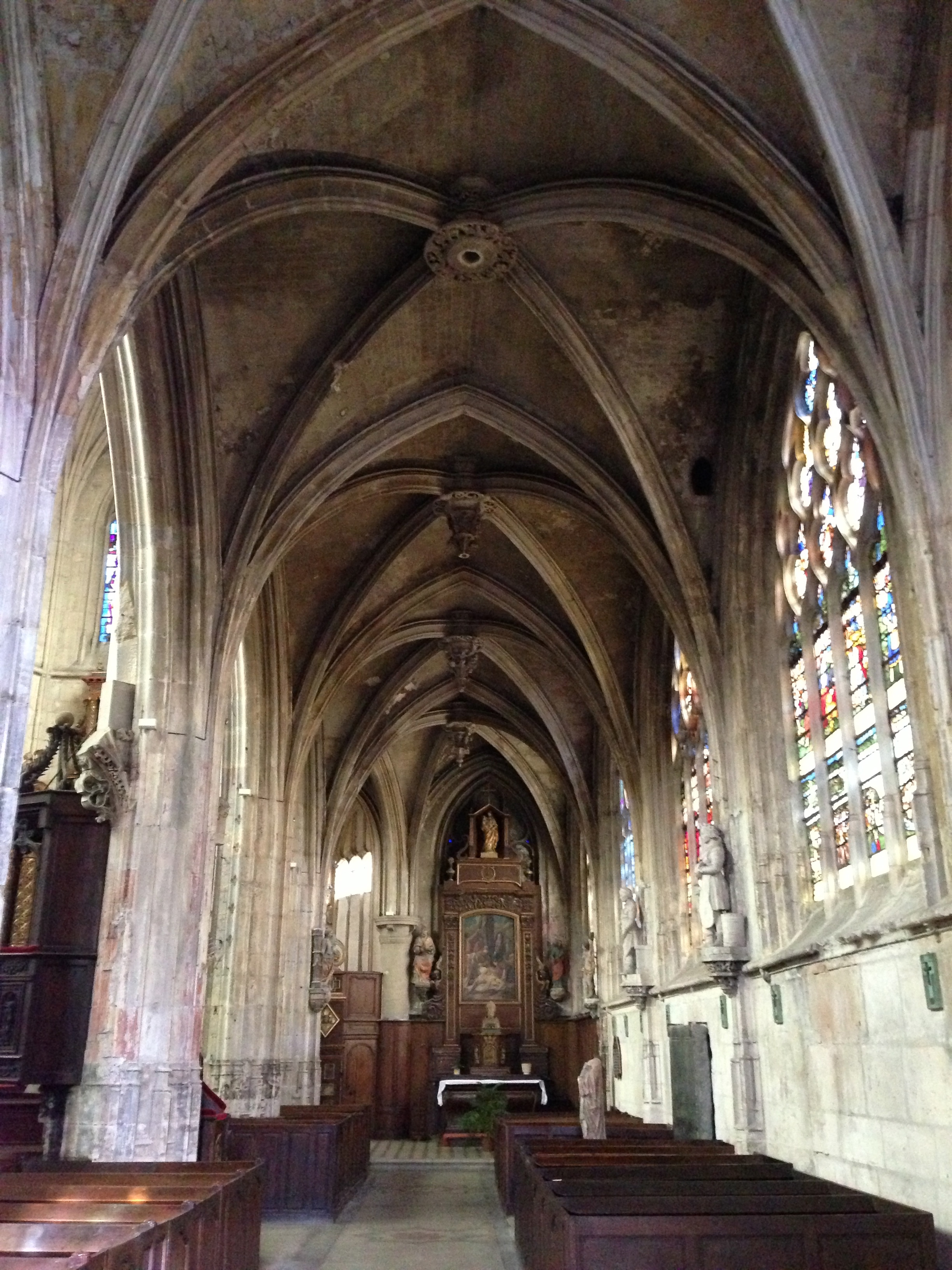
South nave aisle, looking east

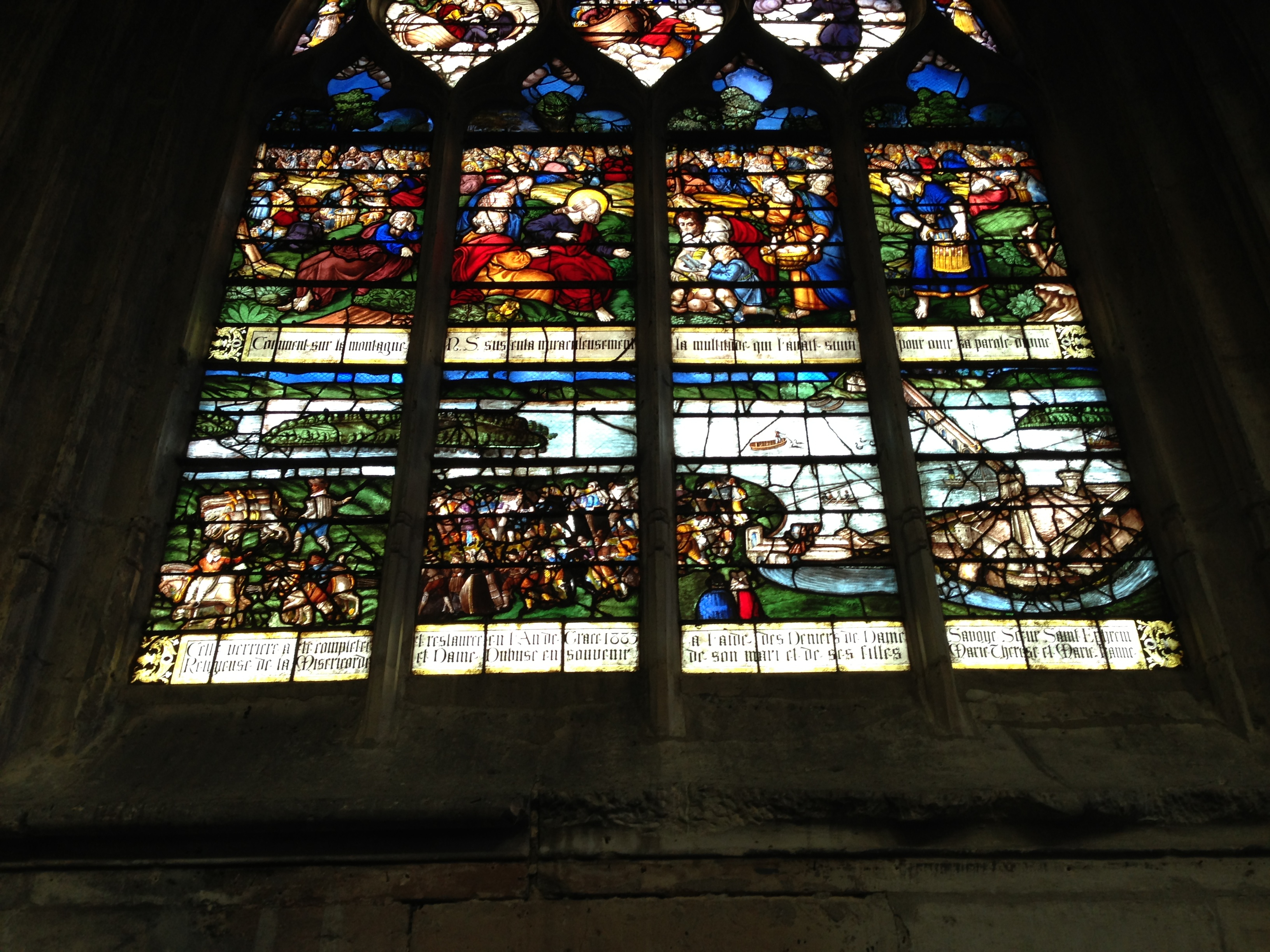
Detail, stained glass program depicting a boat being towed, south nave aisle

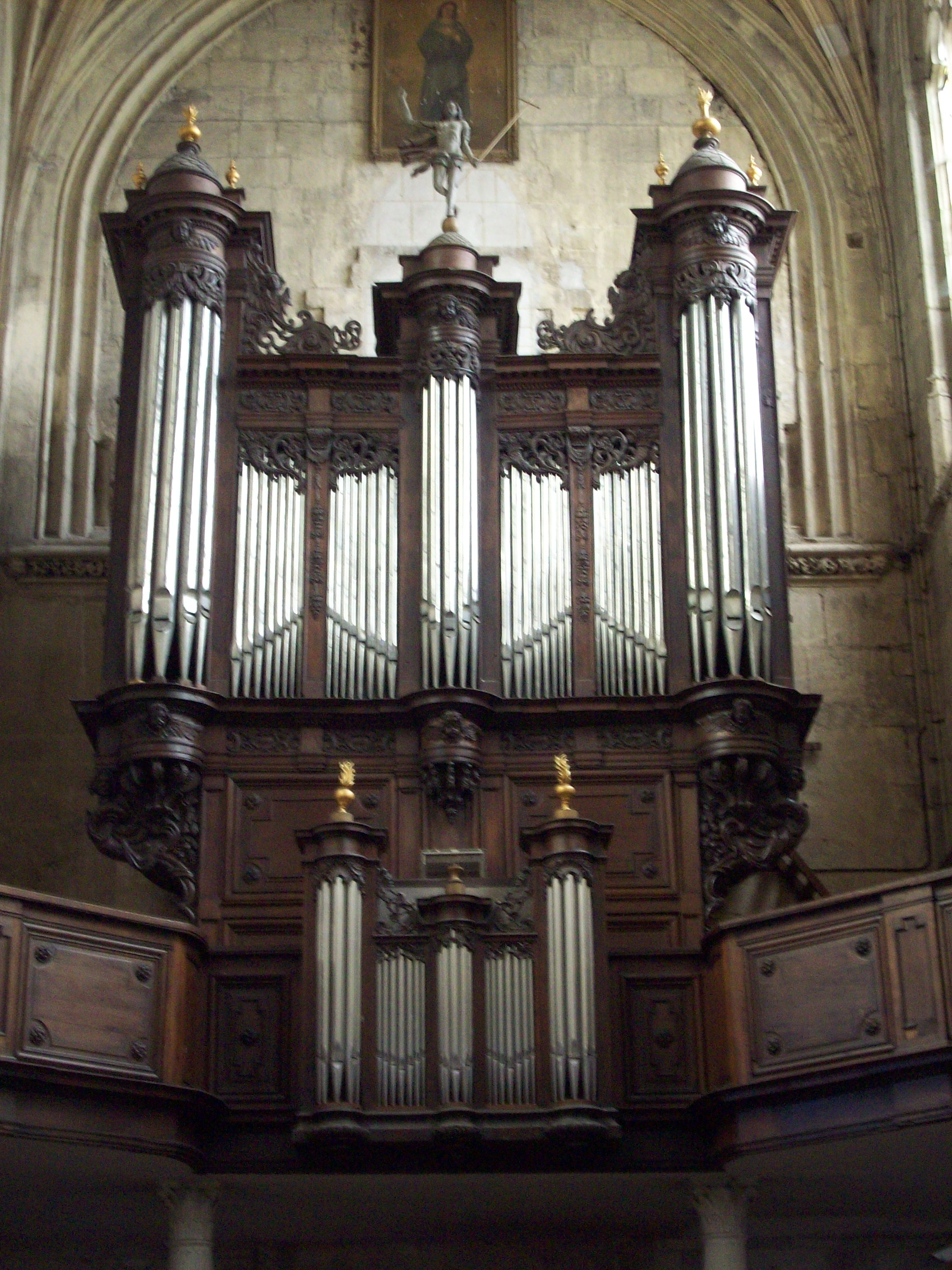
Organ
