= Jean Nicolle =

French Norman painter

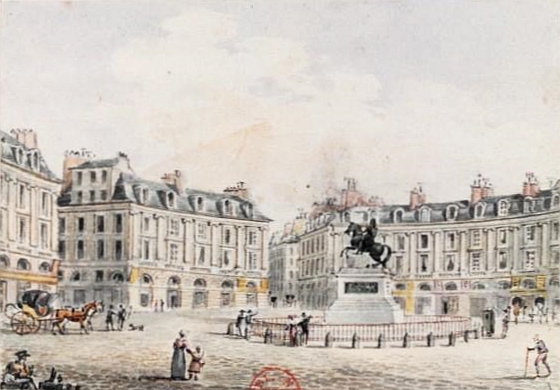
Place des Victoires, Paris, by Victor-Jean Nicolle

Jean Nicolle (19 July 1614 – 12 April 1650) was a French Norman painter and musician.

Jean Nicolle was born in Louviers, Province of Normandy, France in 1614, the fourth child of Louis Nicolle and Marguerite Coyplet. Both his father Louis and his uncle, Marin Nicolle, also painted. He discovered painting at a young age and showed an early talent, painting Saint Adrien, en costume Henri IV for the hospice in Louviers at age 10. On 22 November 1639 he married Anne David (born 1617), with whom he had nine children.

He found a patron in Claude Baudry of Piencourt, the abbot in nearby La Croix-Saint-Leufroy. Some of his paintings decorate the choir of Notre-Dame de Louviers, while others are at the City Museum.

== Gallery ==
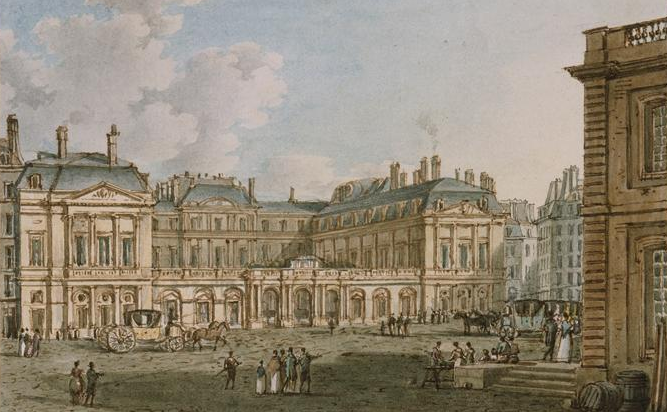
Palais-Royal in 1810

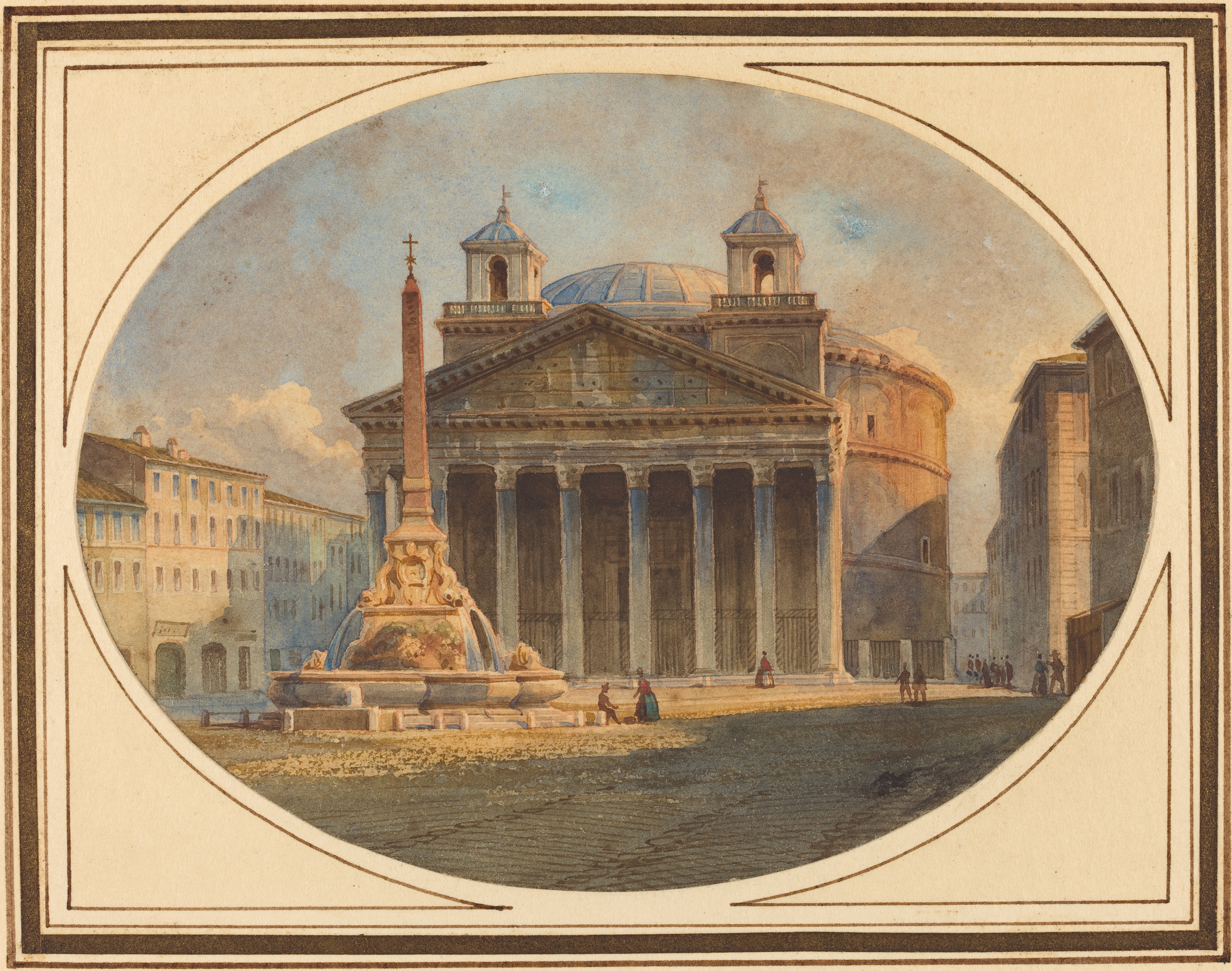
Pantheon

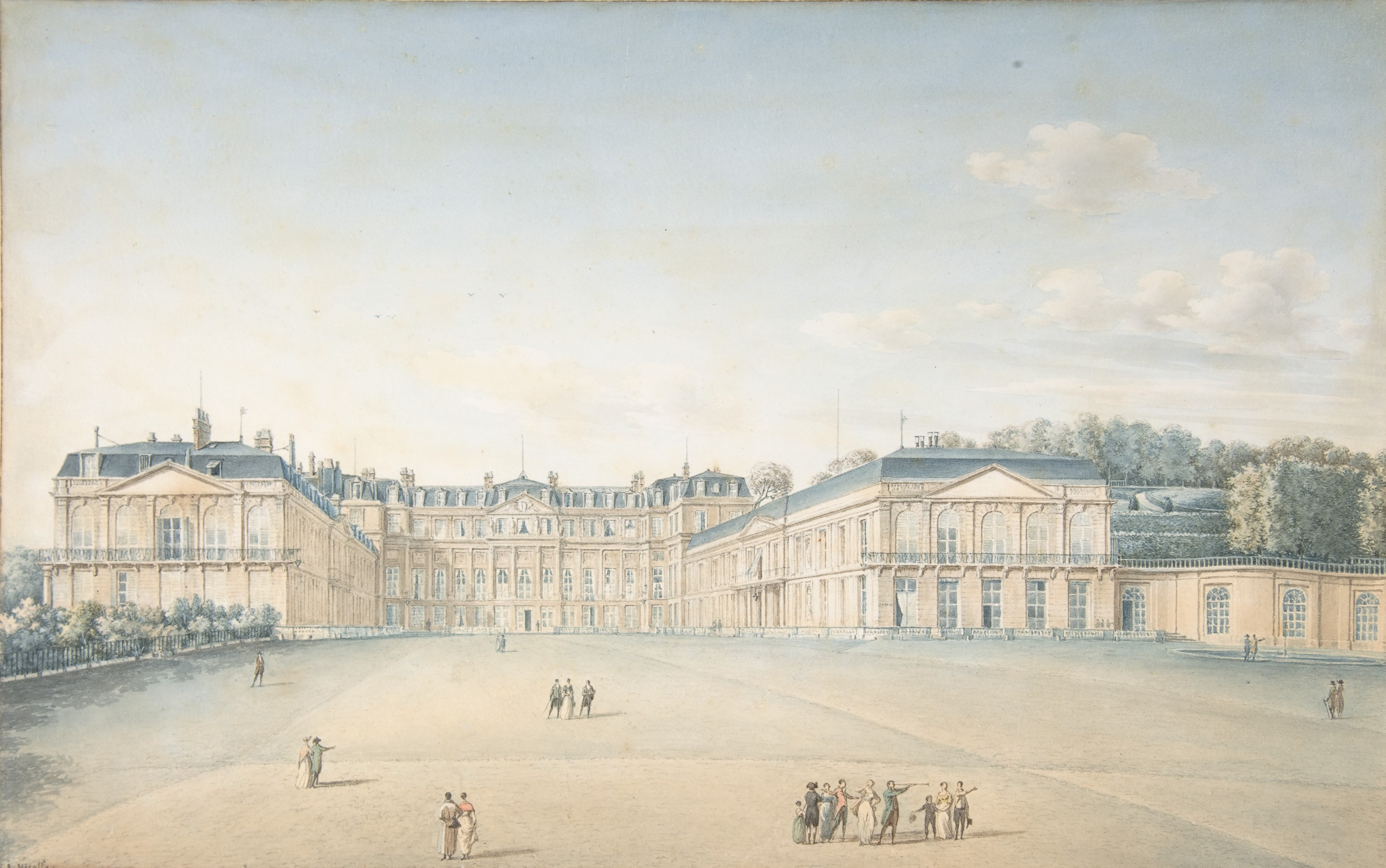
Courtyard of the Château de Saint-Cloud

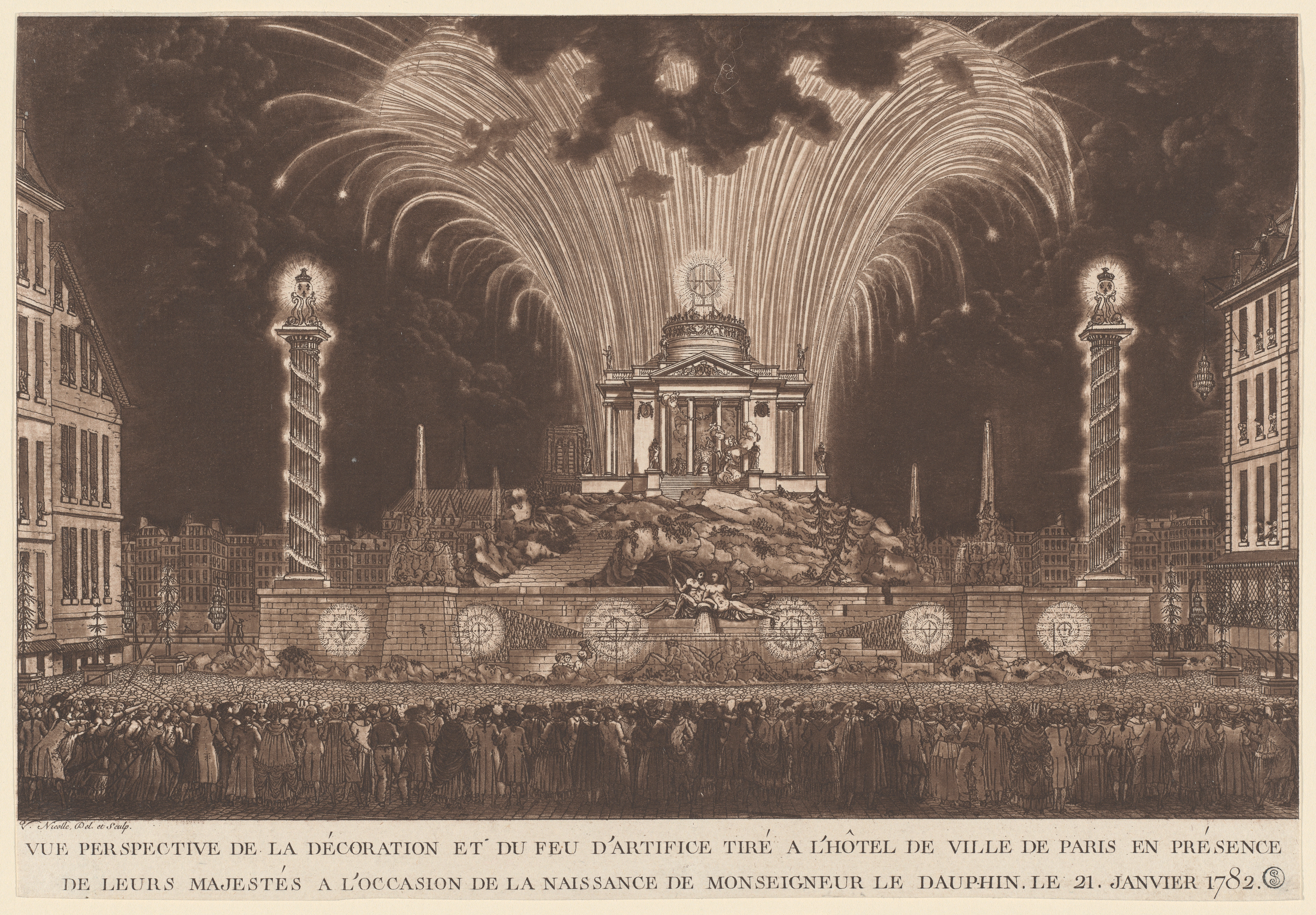
Fireworks Celebrating the Birth of the Dauphin, 1782

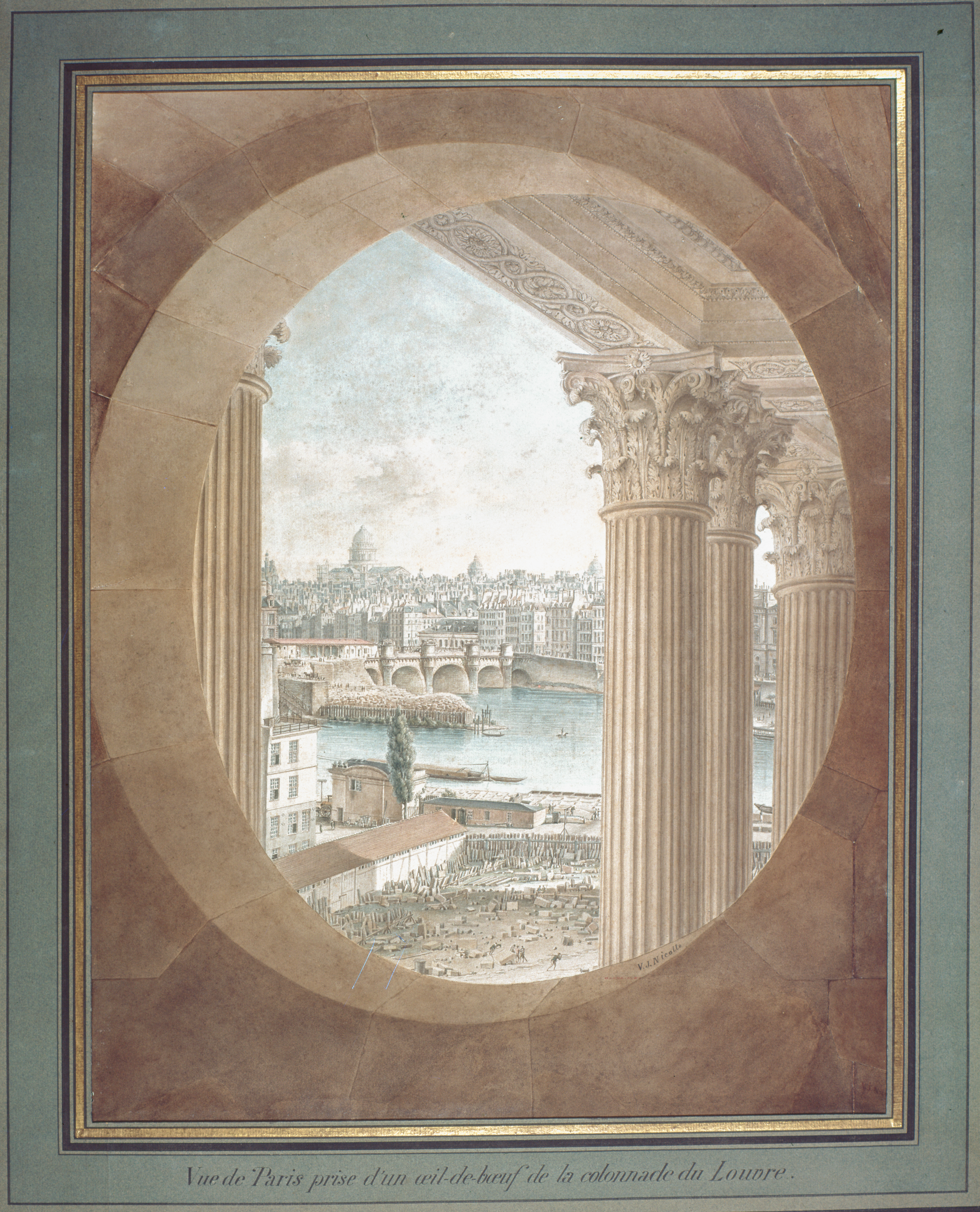
Paris seen from a window the Louvre

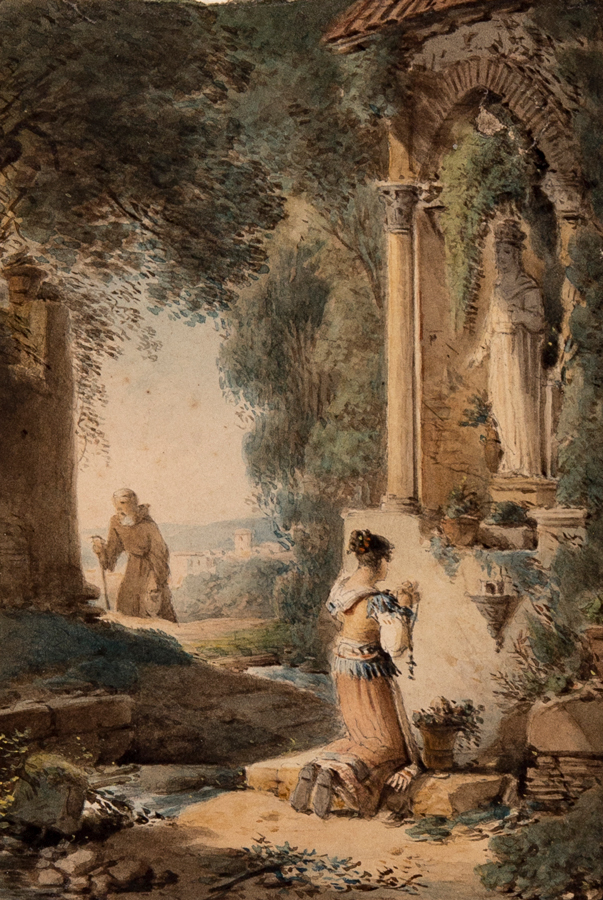
Girl at a wayside calvary
