= Louviers =

- Commune
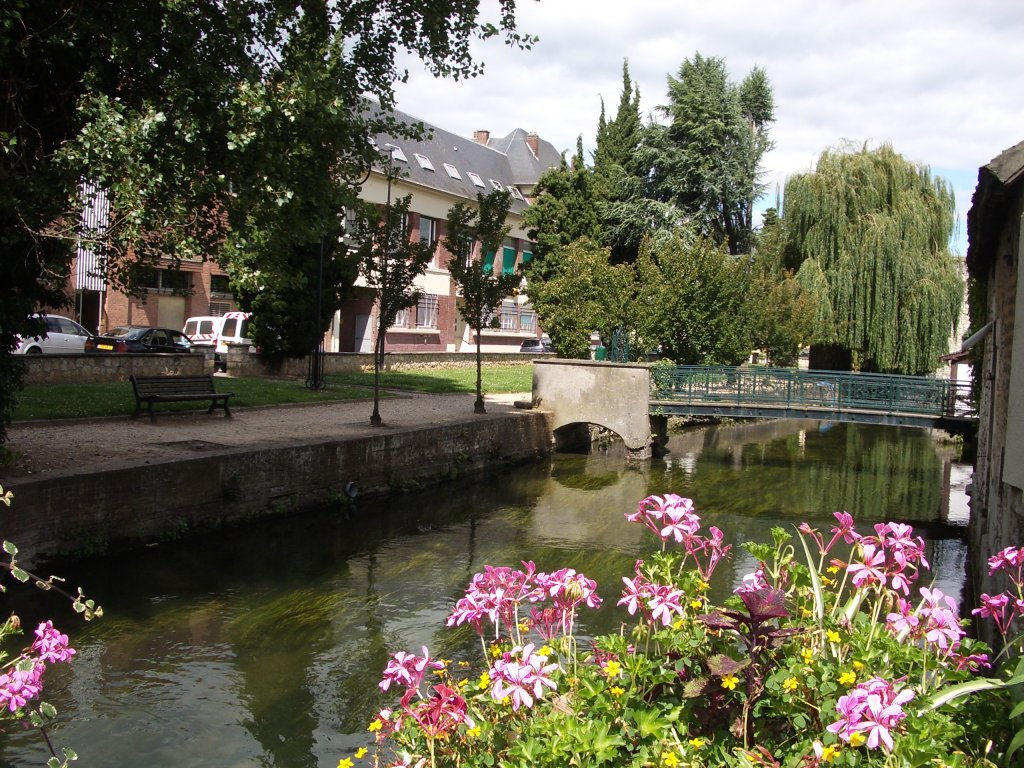
- The bank of the River Eure, with the post office in the background

- Coat of arms
- Location of Louviers
- Location within France Location within Normandy
- Coordinates: 49°13′N 1°10′E
- Country: France
- Region: Normandy
- Department: Eure
- Arrondissement: Les Andelys
- Canton: Louviers
- Intercommunality: CA Seine-Eure

Government
  - Mayor (2020–2026): François-Xavier Priollaud
- Area^{1}: 27.06 km^{2} (10.45 sq mi)
- Elevation: 15 m (49 ft)
- Highest elevation: 149 m (489 ft)
- Lowest elevation: 11 m (36 ft)
- Population (2023): 18,705
  - Density: 691.2/km^{2} (1,790/sq mi)
- Time zone: UTC+01:00 (CET)
  - Summer (DST): UTC+02:00 (CEST)
- INSEE/Postal code: 27375 /27400
- ^{1} French Land Register data, which excludes lakes, ponds, glaciers > 1 km^{2} (0.386 sq mi or 247 acres) and river estuaries.

Louviers (French pronunciation: [luvje]) is a commune in the Eure department in Normandy in north-western France.

Louviers is 100 km (62 mi) from Paris and 30 km (19 mi) from Rouen.

== Population ==
Historical population

| Year | Pop. | ±% p.a. |
|---|---|---|
| 1793 | 9,520 | — |
| 1800 | 6,819 | −4.66% |
| 1806 | 8,472 | +3.68% |
| 1821 | 9,892 | +1.04% |
| 1831 | 9,885 | −0.01% |
| 1836 | 9,927 | +0.08% |
| 1841 | 9,998 | +0.14% |
| 1846 | 10,295 | +0.59% |
| 1851 | 10,577 | +0.54% |
| 1856 | 10,611 | +0.06% |
| 1861 | 10,841 | +0.43% |
| 1866 | 11,707 | +1.55% |
| 1872 | 11,360 | −0.50% |
| 1876 | 10,973 | −0.86% |
| 1881 | 10,753 | −0.40% |
| 1886 | 10,553 | −0.37% |
| 1891 | 9,979 | −1.11% |
| 1896 | 10,199 | +0.44% |
| 1901 | 10,219 | +0.04% |

| Year | Pop. | ±% p.a. |
|---|---|---|
| 1906 | 10,302 | +0.16% |
| 1911 | 10,209 | −0.18% |
| 1921 | 10,345 | +0.13% |
| 1926 | 10,340 | −0.01% |
| 1931 | 10,357 | +0.03% |
| 1936 | 10,239 | −0.23% |
| 1946 | 9,624 | −0.62% |
| 1954 | 10,746 | +1.39% |
| 1962 | 13,160 | +2.57% |
| 1968 | 15,326 | +2.57% |
| 1975 | 18,333 | +2.59% |
| 1982 | 19,000 | +0.51% |
| 1990 | 18,658 | −0.23% |
| 1999 | 18,328 | −0.20% |
| 2007 | 18,120 | −0.14% |
| 2012 | 17,973 | −0.16% |
| 2017 | 18,648 | +0.74% |
| 2023 | 18,705 | +0.05% |

Source: EHESS and INSEE (1968-2023)

== History ==
=== Prehistory ===
In the area around Louviers, cut stones from the Paleolithic era have been found. Some of these are in the town's museum, alongside fragments of a mammoth tusk found not far from the cemetery. Other evidence of human presence in the area at different periods of prehistory includes the menhir of Basse-Cremonville and the Neolithic tomb which was close to it. Various objects from these periods - weapons, vases, stone and bronze tools - have also been found in the area.

=== Ancient Gaul and Roman Gaul ===
A few elements dating from the period of Ancient Gaul have been found at Louviers: a Celtic grave found in 1863 against the wall of the Église Notre-Dame, and several Gallic coins. A hypothesis of a fortified Gallic village has been formulated, but not proven. The Louviers of Roman Gaul is, however, better known. It was not, however, unimportant, as judged by the fact that it appeared in neither the Antonine Itinerary nor the Tabula Peutingeriana.

=== Middle ages ===
Under the Merovingians, Louviers had at least two cemeteries, but it is only from the 9th Century that certain historical events can be dated.

- On 10 February 856, King Charles II (Charles the Bald), father of the future Louis II (in French, Louis le Bègue), promised his son in marriage to a daughter of Erispoe, king of Brittany. In return, Erispoe gave to Charles the duchy of Mans. This arrangement greatly displeased the Breton vassals, and was perhaps one of the reasons for the plot which followed the death of the Breton king the following year.
- In 965, Richard I, Duke of Normandy gave the churches of Louviers and Pinterville, the fisheries of the water-mills of Louviers, and forty sols of rent on these mills to the Abbey of Saint-Taurin, which he had just founded at Évreux. It is the first time, at the end of the period, that the name of Louviers appears in an official deed.
- In 1026, this donation was confirmed by Richard II, Duke of Normandy.
- In 1184, the "mills of the king" burnt down, and were rebuilt.
- In 1195, Richard Lionheart confirmed the charter of his predecessors.
- In 1196, Philip II of France and Richard Lionheart signed the Trêve de Louviers (written confirmation of the peace of Issoudun).
- In 1197, Richard Lionheart gave Louviers to the archbishop of Rouen, Walter de Coutances, in return for which, Richard received Les Andelys and with it, the opportunity to build Château Gaillard. From this date up to the French Revolution, the archbishops of Rouen were counts of Louviers.
- Starting from around the beginning of the 13th century, the church of Notre-Dame de Louviers, was built. By 1240, the principal parts were finished: the choir, the nave and the transept surmounted by a lantern tower.
- The town continued to prosper up to the middle of the 14th century, thanks to its cloth industry, and it is possible that the population exceeded 10,000. Evidence of this wealth includes the construction of a buildings: a bishop's manor, houses of wood and of wattle and daub, and stone dwellings for the master drapers and the rich merchants.
- In 1346 and again in 1356, the town was again captured and sacked. It was occupied for four years up to 1360. On 16 May of that year, Edward the Black Prince, solemnly pronounced, in the name of his father, Edward III of England, the ratification of the treaty which, in exchange for one quarter of the kingdom of France, set at liberty John II of France (French: Jean le Bon), who had been a prisoner in Poitiers.
- In 1364, the people of Louviers asked Charles V of France for authorisation to fortify the town's ramparts.
- From 1379 to 1385, the church was repaired: the vaults of the nave were raised and a spire 50 metres high was built on top of the bell-tower.
- On 12 July 1380, the constable of the garrison, inspecting the walls towards midnight, found a sentinel asleep. The constable angrily threw him, head first, at a wooden sentry box, and killed him.
- In 1409, the townspeople started work again on the fortifications, which had been neglected after the victories of Bertrand du Guesclin against the English. They undertook to build on the side of their church a bell-tower in a style more military than religious.
- In 1418, the English laid siege to the town. The battle was fierce and the victors pitiless. The town was taken after 26 hours (15 according to English sources): 120 townspeople were killed at sword-point, while the others were spared only by paying a large ransom (15,000 ecus). The occupation that followed lasted 11 years.
- In December 1429, Étienne de Vignolles, also called La Hire, companion of Joan of Arc, retook the town. The English, not able to accept this fact, besieged the town in May 1431 with 12,000 men. The new siege lasted nearly six months. The town capitulated on 22 October after it had lost most of its defenders. The English promised honourable conditions to the survivors, but razed the town.
- In 1440, the town was again liberated and its inhabitants were able to rebuild it. The English tried one last time to take the town in 1441. In that year, Charles VII of France exempted the people of Louviers in perpetuity from paying most royal taxes, and in particular, the heaviest tax, the taille. The town received, incorporated in its coat of arms, the motto "Loviers le Franc" (Louviers the loyal), and the inhabitants received the right to bear the letter L in embroidery, goldsmithery or wherever else they pleased.
- In the 15th century, Louvier's cloth industry kept its royal protection under the king Louis XI, as was the case with other towns of Normandy.

=== Renaissance ===
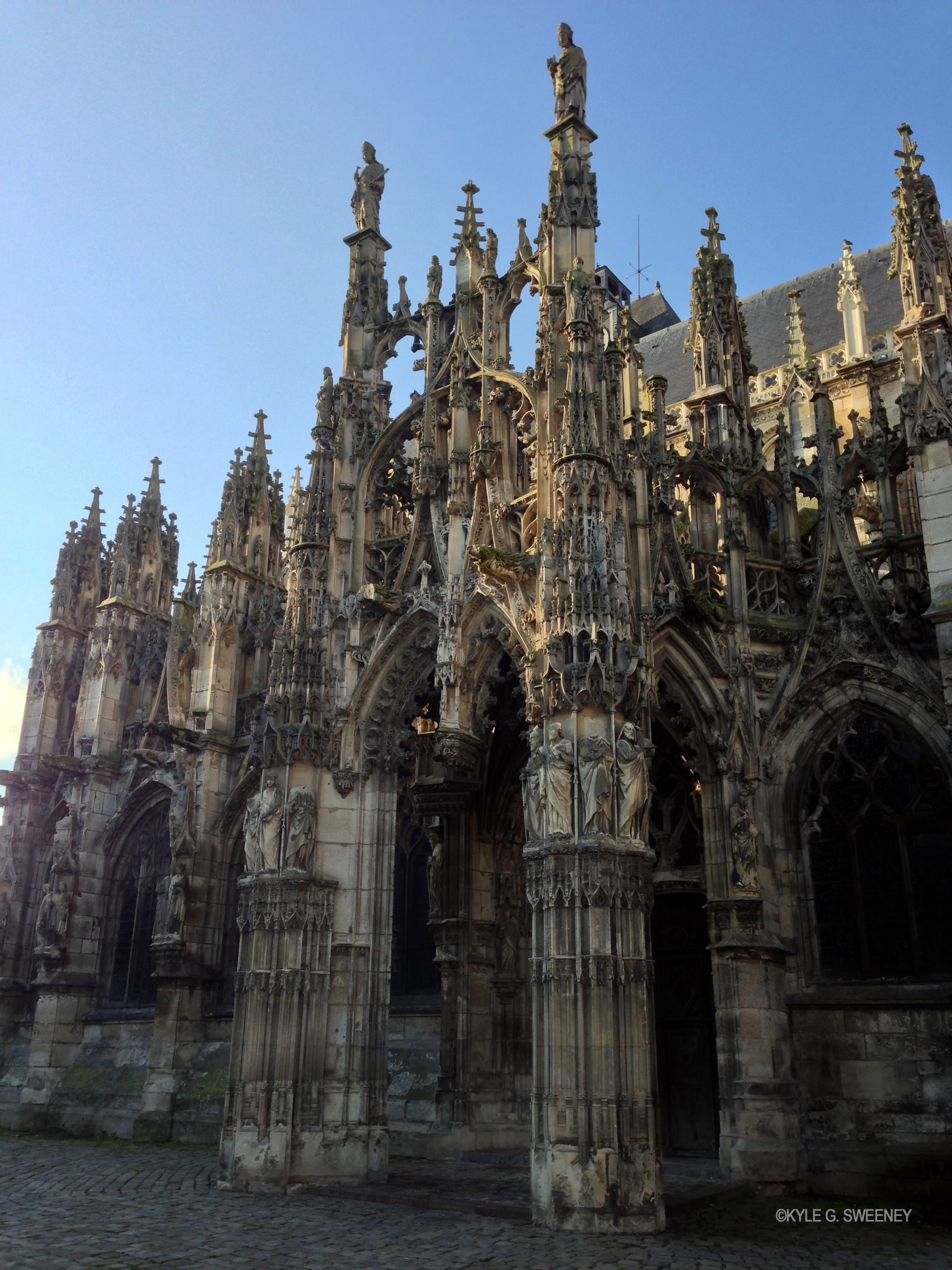
Notre-Dame de Louviers, south porch

- Between 1496 and 1510 the southern façade of the church of Notre-Dame was expanded in the flamboyant gothic style. At about the same time, the lantern tower was also renovated.
- In 1562, Rouen fell into the hands of the Protestants. On the orders of Charles IX of France, the Parliament of Normandy was transferred to Louviers, where it sat from 5 August to 28 October.
- In 1591, Charles de Gontaut, Marshal de Biron (1562 – 1602), the lieutenant of Henri IV, presented himself in front of Louviers on 6 June and seized the town, after a brief but violent fight; this allowed the king to enter.

=== 17th and 18th centuries ===
- In the 17th century, several epidemics of plague struck the town (1619, 1620, 1624, 1648, 1694), with many victims.
- In 1620, the franchises granted by Charles VII were abolished by Louis XIII.
- In 1681, the royal administration installed in Louviers a cloth factory specialising in products of very high quality. Managed for more than 50 years by Francois Le Camus, it brought some prosperity to the town. But regulations brought in by minister Jean-Baptiste Colbert facilitated competition from the town of Elbeuf.
- In the 18th century, many natural disasters hit the town: terrible winters (1709, 1740, 1776, 1784); a hurricane (1705); floods (1740, 1776, 1784); and major fires (1782, 1783).
- In 1709, a rabid wolf entered the town and bit 15 people, killing five.
- In 1785, Louviers got its first factory with mechanical machinery. It spun cotton using the new English methods.

=== 1789–1945 ===
During the French Revolution, Louviers' citizens were moderate in their cahiers de doléances (grievances presented to the king), and followed the currents of thought and action of the rest of the country. This moderation was shown by constitutional royalists at the time of the first two revolutionary assemblies; by Girondists at the start of the National Convention, and by the Thermidorian Reaction after the execution of Robespierre.

Food shortages under the Revolution and the fact that they became worse under the French Directory favoured support of a strong government, and the consular constitution was accepted unanimously by the voters. The first consul (Napoleon) visited Louviers on 30 October 1802. He returned on 1 June 1810 with his wife Marie-Louise and they visited the town's factories.

The town was occupied by the Prussians in 1815.

The regulations of Jean-Baptiste Colbert (1619-1683) had led the manufacturers of Louviers to specialise in extremely fine cloth. But the Revolution did not favour luxury fabrics, leading to a severe downturn in manufacturing in the town. With the introduction of new manufacturing methods, however, the quality was maintained while lowering the price. With this, the town enjoyed a new prosperity that lasted up to the middle of the twentieth century. This prosperity was reflected in some important civic projects:

- Under the Bourbon Restoration (1814–1830), the old ramparts were demolished and replaced by boulevards.
- Under the July Monarchy (1830–1848) a library, a savings bank, and the first true public school for boys were built, and Notre-Dame was restored.
- Under the Second Empire (1852–1870), streets were opened and paved, schools, the port, bridges and lighting were improved; important works were done to l'Hotel de ville and a new railway station was opened.

The revolutions of 1830 (the July Revolution) and 1848 passed almost unnoticed in Louviers.

In 1870, the war against Prussia caused 16 deaths, 13 wounded and 23 prisoners. The town was evacuated at the beginning of March 1871, then life resumed as normal under the Third Republic. In 1855 the école primaire supérieure was established – it subsequently became a college then a lycée. In 1899, Louviers' streets were lit with electricity. Before World War I, a municipal theatre, a museum and a range of organisations – scholarly, sporting, musical, cooperative – flourished.

In June 1940, Louviers suffered greatly under the bombardments of the Battle of France. Members of several of the Resistance groups in the town were arrested and deported. On 25 August 1944, the Americans, then the British, liberated the town after several bombardments. On 8 October 1944, Louviers was visited by General de Gaulle, and on 26 June 1949, the town was awarded the Croix de Guerre.

=== Recent history ===
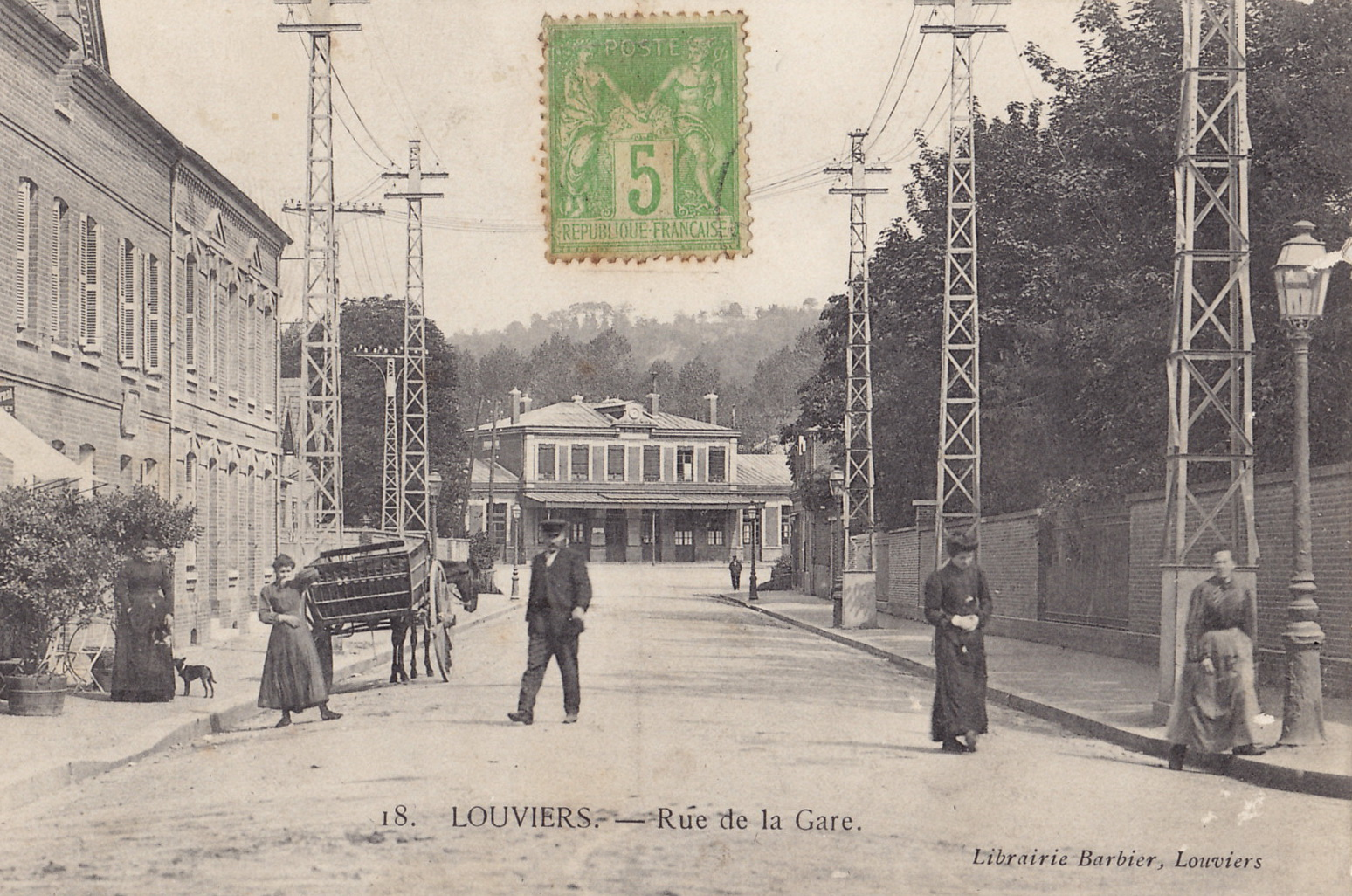
La Rue de la Gare (the street of the railway station); picture postcard, 1920s.The town was served from 1872 to 1950 by the railway line Saint-Georges-Motel à Grand-Quevilly, which linked Rouen and Orléans.

After the Second World War, the town was reconstructed, and several new quarters were created: Saint-Lubin, Saint-Germain, la Roquette, la Côte de Paris, Saint-Jean.

In the second half of the twentieth century, Louviers' political history has a left-wing tilt. From 1953 to 1958, the mayor was Pierre Mendès France (1907–1982), a member of the left-wing Radical Party. From 1965 to 1969, the mayor was Ernest Martin of the DVG (Miscellaneous left). The candidates on the list that he headed were left-wing and anti-authoritarian; their party allegiances went from the Parti Socialiste Unifié (PSU) to the anarchists. They sought self governance (autogestion), and the events of May 1968 led in Louviers to the establishment of self-managing bodies – neighbourhood committees, avant-garde cultural policies, and so on.

The right won the municipal elections in 1969. For eight years, town hall debates were stormy, but then in 1977, Henri Fromentin was elected mayor on a platform of implementing Ernest Martin's revolutionary programme.

== Sights ==
Its church, Notre-Dame, has parts which date from the thirteenth century. The 16th century porch on the south side is an example of Late Gothic Flamboyant architecture.

The Musée de Louviers is the only Musée de France in the Seine-Eure area.

== Personalities ==
It is also well known for its Musée des décors de Théâtre, d'Opéra et de Cinéma (Fondation Wakhévitch), after Georges Wakhévitch (1907–1984) who lived nearby. The composer Maurice Duruflé (b. in Louviers 1906 - d. in Louveciennes 1986) was born in Louviers. Other famous persons include:

- Jacques Ovyn (16th-century French playwright).
- Jacques François Édouard Hervieux, pediatrician
- Jean Nicolle (Louviers 1604- Louviers 1650), painter.
- Pierre Mendès-France, mayor of Louviers in 1954.
- Olivier Besancenot, politician.

== International relations ==
Louviers is twinned with:

- Weymouth and Portland, England
- Holzwickede, Germany
- San Vito dei Normanni, Italy

== See also ==
- Communes of the Eure department
- Treaty of Louviers
