= National Academy of Medicine (France) =

French organization

Coordinates: 48°51′23″N 02°20′03″E

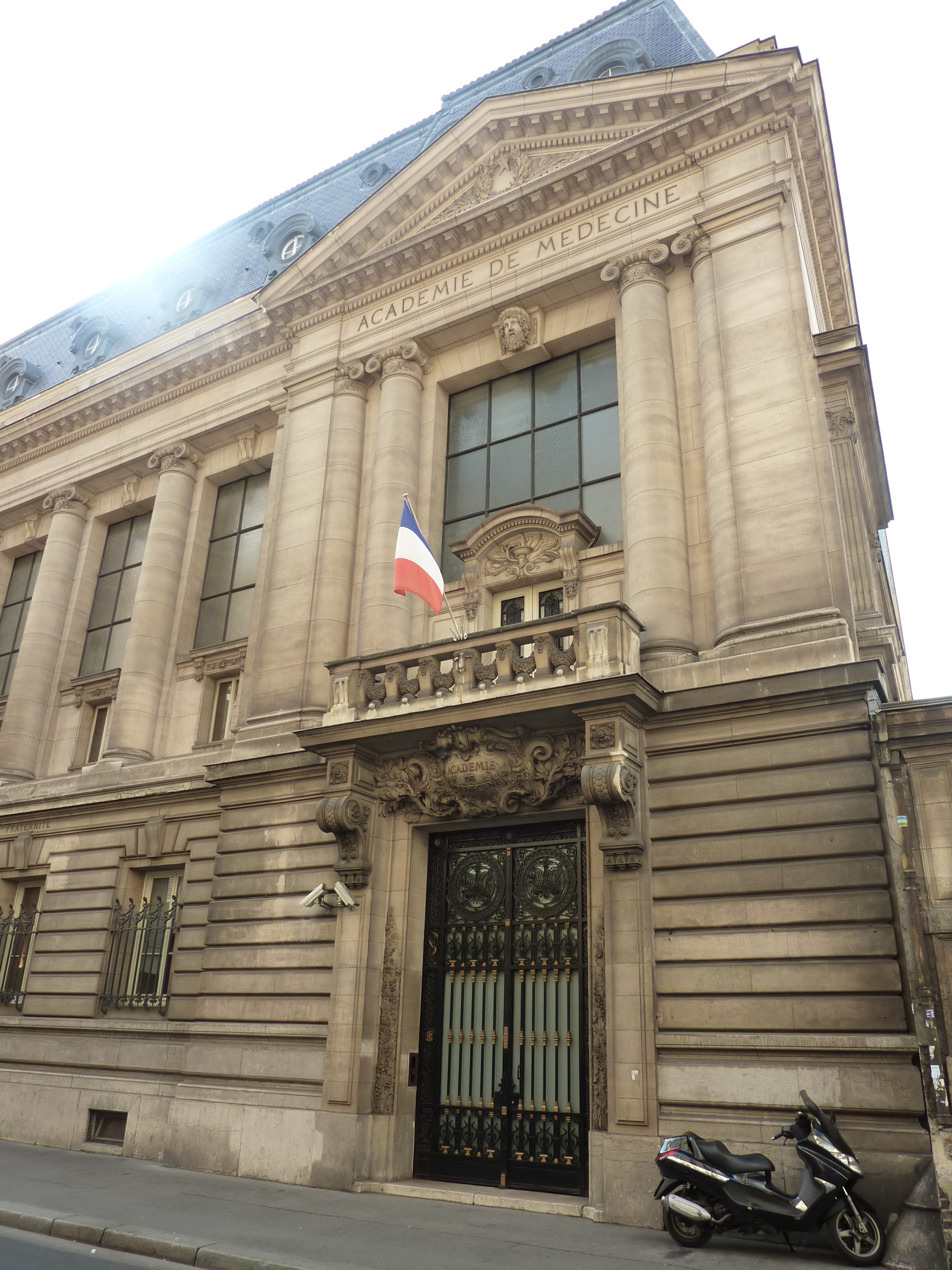
building exterior

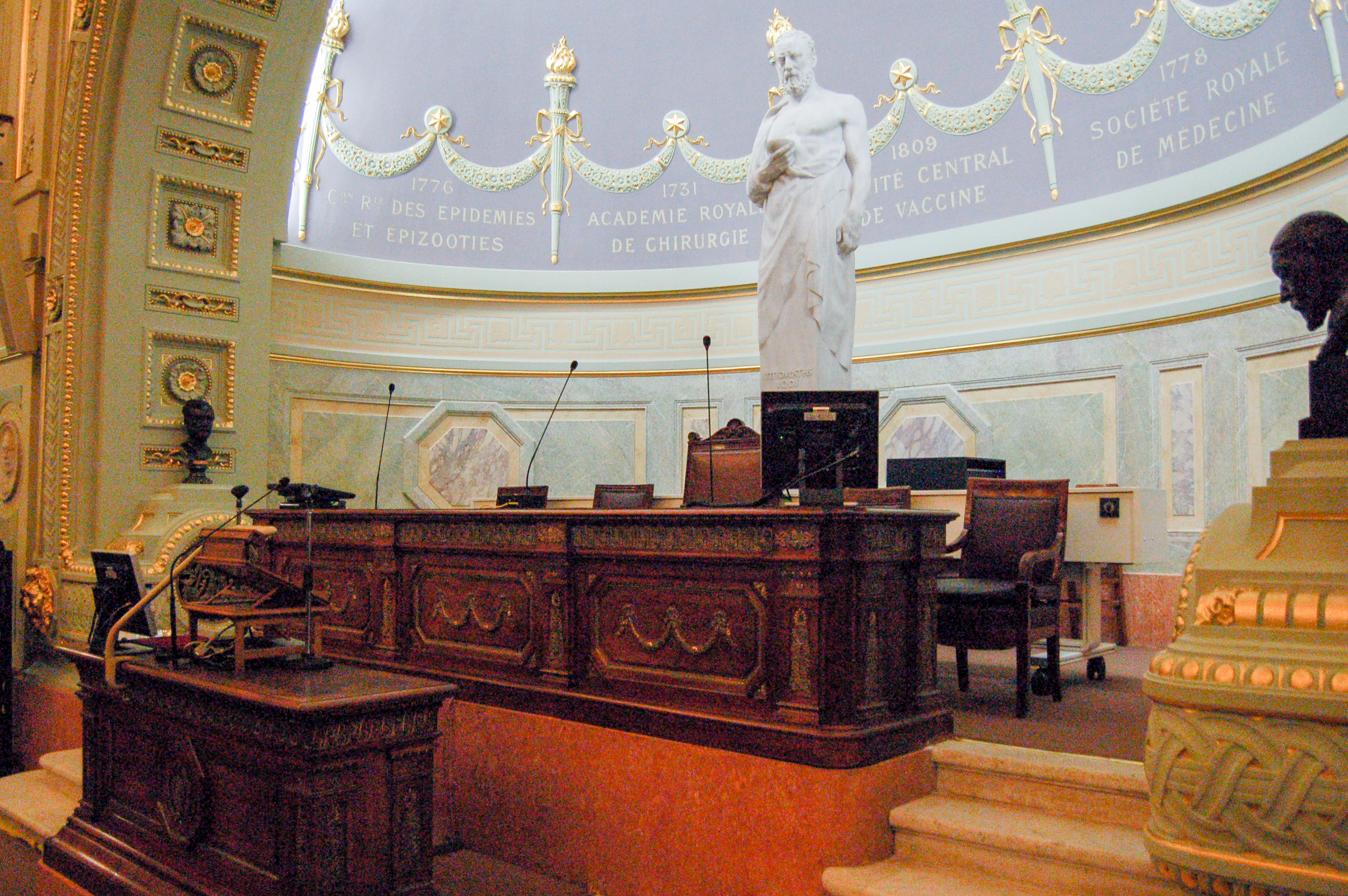

The Académie nationale de médecine (English: National Academy of Medicine) is a French learned society situated at 16 Rue Bonaparte in 6th arrondissement, Paris. It was created in 1820 by King Louis XVIII at the urging of baron Antoine Portal. At its inception, the institution was known as the Académie royale de médecine (Royal Academy of Medicine). This academy was endowed with the legal status of two institutions which preceded it — Académie royale de chirurgie (Royal Academy of Surgery), which was created in 1731 and Société royale de médecine (Royal Society of Medicine), which was created in 1776.

== Background ==
Academy members initially convened at the Paris Faculty of Medicine (or Faculté de Médecine de Paris). Four years later, the academy acquired its own headquarters, in the form of a mansion in the rue where it was located until 1850. The office was then relocated to a vaulted hall of the Hospital of Charity on rue Saint Pierre.

Their current facility on Rue Bonaparte was designed by the French architect Justin Rochet, and was constructed between 1899 and 1902.

In addition to Medicine, the academy has also been known to concern itself with access thereto.

As of 2020, Maurice Tubiana is the president of the academy.

== Renaming ==
The institution name has been changed several times since its creation. The following provides a timeline for the various names taken on by the institution:

- Académie Royale de Médecine (1820–1851);
- Académie Impériale de Médecine (1852–1947);
- Académie Nationale de Médecine (1947–present).

== Edict ==
The edict of 1820 (formally known as Ordonnance de 1820) was signed by Louis XVIII. The edict issued the following missions to the Académie Royale de Médecine:

" This Academy is especially instituted to respond to all requests coming from the government on all subjects that may concern public health, and mainly on epidemics, diseases specific to a country, epizooties, diverse fields of legal medicine, propagation of antivariolic vaccination, appraisal of new and secret, internal as well as external, medications, natural or man-made mineral waters, etc..."

"The Academy will moreover take charge of the works of the Companie royale de médecine and the Académie Royale de chirurgie in all fields of study or research which can contribute to the improvement of the art of healing."

Consequently, all registers and papers belonging to the Companie royale de médecine and the Académie Royale de chirurgie and related to the tasks assigned to the Academies, will be transmitted as Archives to the new academy."

== Notable members ==
- Benjamin Ball
- Victor Babeș
- Albert Besson
- Pierre-François-Guillaume Boullay
- Pierre Brasdor
- María Blanco-Prieto
- André Chantemesse
- Marie Curie
- Joseph D'Aquin
- Pierre Deniker
- François-Joseph Double
- Simon-Emmanuel Duplay
- Georges Duhamel
- Manouchehr Eghbal
- Ernest Fourneau
- Albin Haller
- Paul Giroud
- François Henri Hallopeau
- Jacques François Édouard Hervieux
- Ahmed Taleb Ibrahimi
- Sigismond Jaccoud
- Mary Putnam Jacobi
- Jérôme Lejeune
- Antoine Joseph Jobert de Lamballe
- Antoine Germain Labarraque
- Constantin Levaditi
- Henri Lôo
- Joseph-François Malgaigne
- Jean-Pierre Olié

== See also ==
- Royal Commission on Animal Magnetism
