= Pont-de-l'Arche =

- Commune
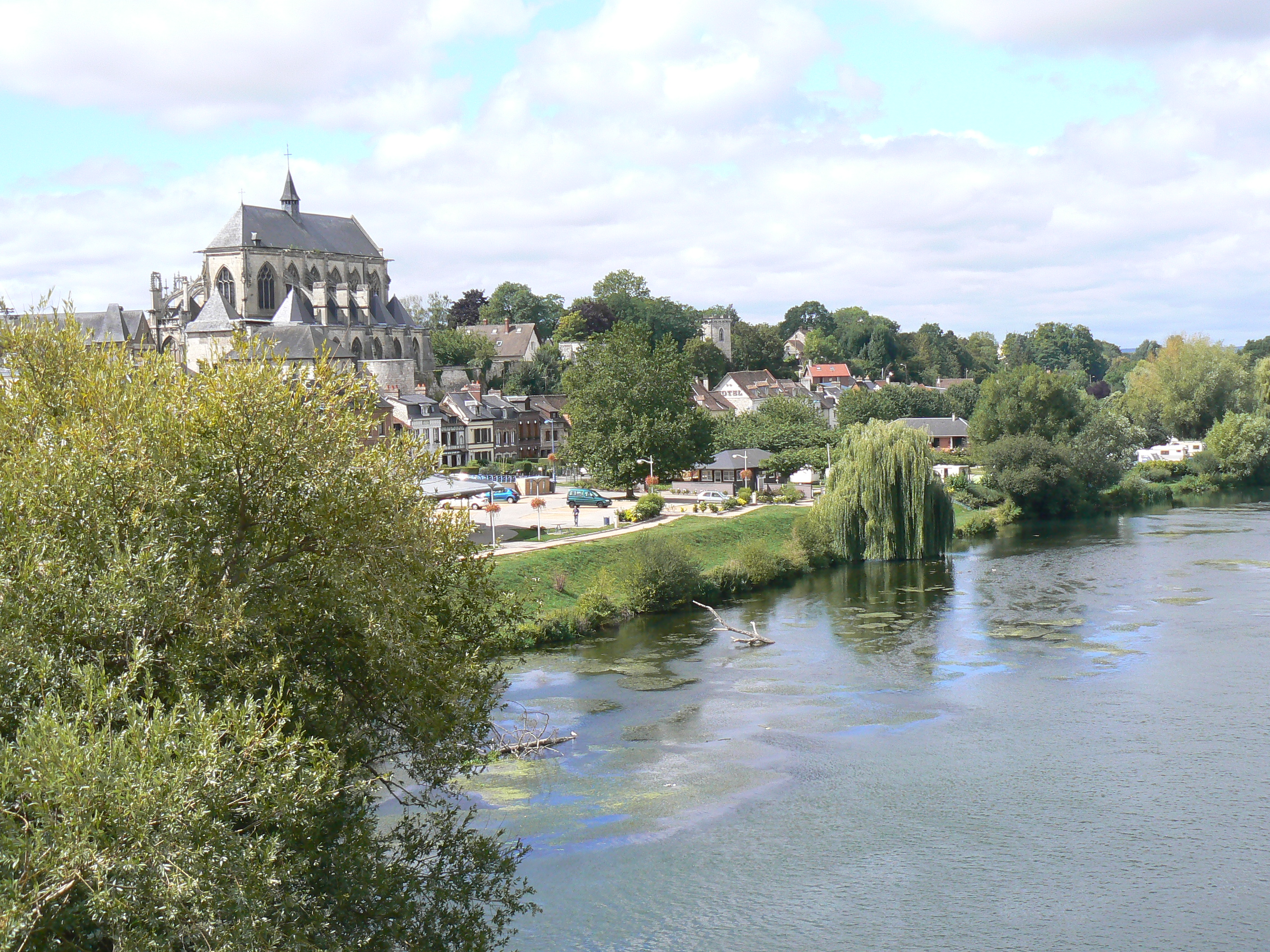
- A general view of Pont-de-l'Arche

- Coat of arms
- Location of Pont-de-l'Arche
- Location within France Location within Normandy
- Coordinates: 49°18′12″N 1°09′18″E
- Country: France
- Region: Normandy
- Department: Eure
- Arrondissement: Les Andelys
- Canton: Pont-de-l'Arche
- Intercommunality: CA Seine-Eure

Government
  - Mayor (2020–2026): Richard Jacquet
- Area^{1}: 9.35 km^{2} (3.61 sq mi)
- Elevation: 22 m (72 ft)
- Highest elevation: 131 m (430 ft)
- Lowest elevation: 2 m (6.6 ft)
- Population (2023): 4,133
  - Density: 442/km^{2} (1,140/sq mi)
- Time zone: UTC+01:00 (CET)
  - Summer (DST): UTC+02:00 (CEST)
- INSEE/Postal code: 27469 /27340
- ^{1} French Land Register data, which excludes lakes, ponds, glaciers > 1 km^{2} (0.386 sq mi or 247 acres) and river estuaries.

Pont-de-l'Arche (French pronunciation: [pɔ̃ də laʁʃ]) is a commune of the Eure département in France. Notable monuments include the parish church of Notre-Dame-des-Arts, which was built in the late Flamboyant style.

== Population ==
Historical population

| Year | Pop. | ±% p.a. |
|---|---|---|
| 1793 | 1,639 | — |
| 1800 | 1,480 | −1.45% |
| 1806 | 1,514 | +0.38% |
| 1821 | 1,486 | −0.12% |
| 1831 | 1,483 | −0.02% |
| 1836 | 1,674 | +2.45% |
| 1841 | 1,687 | +0.15% |
| 1846 | 1,755 | +0.79% |
| 1851 | 1,815 | +0.67% |
| 1856 | 1,699 | −1.31% |
| 1861 | 1,661 | −0.45% |
| 1866 | 1,643 | −0.22% |
| 1872 | 1,617 | −0.27% |
| 1876 | 1,618 | +0.02% |
| 1881 | 1,711 | +1.12% |
| 1886 | 1,789 | +0.90% |
| 1891 | 1,752 | −0.42% |
| 1896 | 1,867 | +1.28% |
| 1901 | 1,890 | +0.25% |

| Year | Pop. | ±% p.a. |
|---|---|---|
| 1906 | 1,859 | −0.33% |
| 1911 | 1,921 | +0.66% |
| 1921 | 1,845 | −0.40% |
| 1926 | 1,808 | −0.40% |
| 1931 | 1,907 | +1.07% |
| 1936 | 1,913 | +0.06% |
| 1946 | 2,025 | +0.57% |
| 1954 | 2,118 | +0.56% |
| 1962 | 2,308 | +1.08% |
| 1968 | 2,737 | +2.88% |
| 1975 | 2,883 | +0.75% |
| 1982 | 2,456 | −2.26% |
| 1990 | 3,022 | +2.63% |
| 1999 | 3,499 | +1.64% |
| 2007 | 4,004 | +1.70% |
| 2012 | 4,163 | +0.78% |
| 2017 | 4,143 | −0.10% |
| 2023 | 4,133 | −0.04% |

Source: EHESS and INSEE (1968–2023)

== See also ==
- Communes of the Eure department
