= Jacques François Édouard Hervieux =

French pediatrician and gynecologist

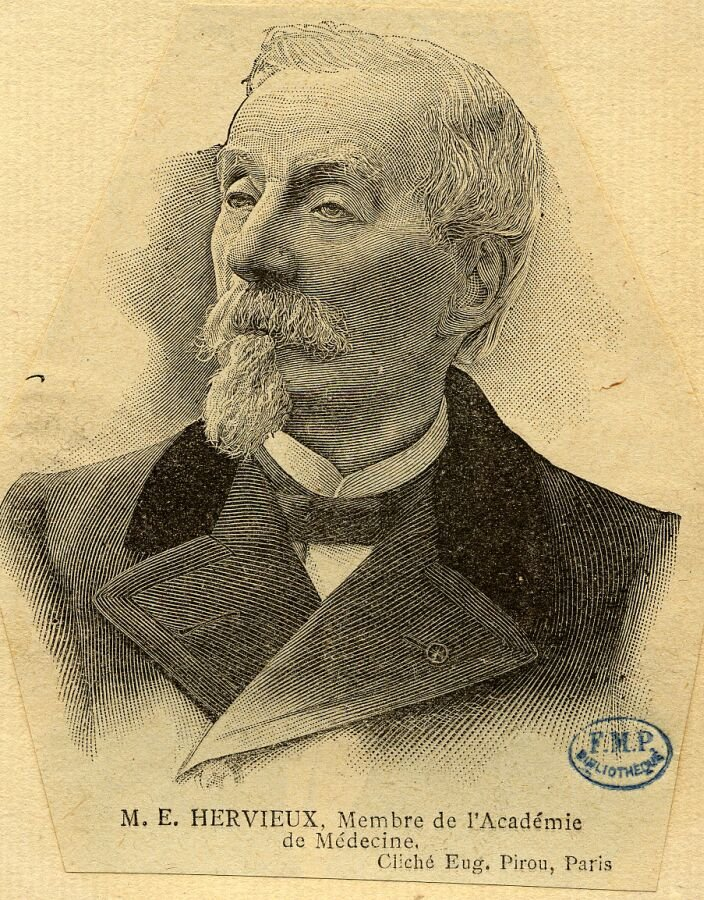
Jacques François Édouard Hervieux

Jacques François Édouard Hervieux (4 September 1818 – 31 March 1905) was a French pediatrician and gynecologist born in Louviers.

In 1838 he received his licence ès lettres in Rouen, afterwards obtaining a degree in science in Paris (1841), where he later studied medicine. From 1844 to 1848 he worked as a hospital interne in Paris, followed by many years as a hospital physician. In 1892 he became an officer of the Légion d'Honneur, and in 1896 was appointed president of the Académie Nationale de Médecine. He is buried at Cimetière de Montmartre.

Hervieux is remembered for his systematic research of neonatal jaundice. In 1847 he published a major work on the disease called De l'ictère de nouveau-nés.

== Written works ==
- De l'ictère de nouveau-nés, ("Of jaundice in newborns") Université de Paris, 1847.
- De l'emploi de la digitaline, de ses effets physiologiques, etc., ("The use of digitalis, its physiological effects, etc.") Université de Paris, 1848.
- De la diphtérie, ("Of diphtheria") Université de Paris, 1860.
- Étiologie et prophylaxie des épidémies puerpérales, ("Etiology and prophylaxis of puerperal epidemics") Université de Paris, 1865.
- Ictère puerpéral, ("Puerperal jaundice") Université de Paris, 1867.
- Traité clinique et pratique des maladies puerpérales suites de couches, Université de Paris, 1870.
