= Jacques Ovyn =

French playwright

Jacques Ovyn (or Ouyn), born in Louviers (Normandy), was a 16th-century French playwright.

He wrote a tragedy, Tobie, presented in 1597 (?) and printed in Rouen in 1606: Thobie, tragi-comédie nouvelle, tirée de la S. Bible, par Jacques Ovyn Lovérien. Dédiée à Madame du Roulet, Rouen, Raphaël du Petit Val, 1606, in-12 with 36 sheets.

== See also ==
- French Renaissance literature
