= Pierre Brasdor =

French surgeon

Pierre Brasdor (19 December 1721 – 28 September 1799) was a French surgeon. He was born in the province of Maine, France. He took his degree in Paris as master of surgery in 1752, and was appointed regius professor of anatomy and director of the Académie Nationale de Médecine. He was a skilful operator, whose name was long attached to a ligature he devised; and he was an ardent advocate of inoculation. He died in Paris on 28 September 1799.
