= María Blanco-Prieto =

Pharmaceutical scientist

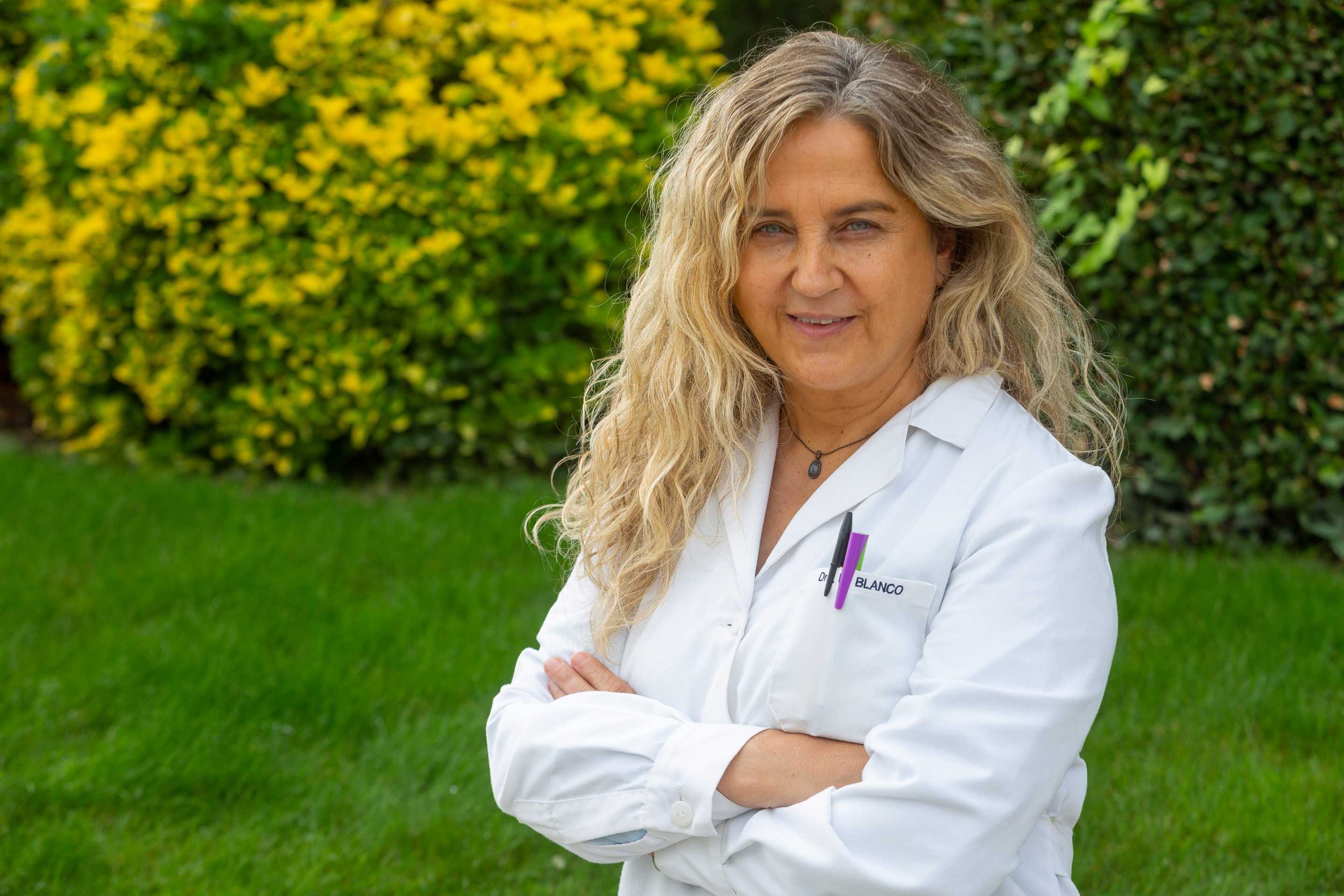
- Born: María José Blanco Prieto
- Education: University of Santiago de Compostela (PharmD) University of Paris-Sud (PhD)
- Known for: Research in nanomedicine and controlled drug delivery systems for treating pediatric cancer, cardiovascular disease, and neurodegenerative disease
- Scientific career
- Fields: Pharmaceutical sciences, Nanomedicine, Drug delivery
- Workplaces: University of Navarra

María José Blanco Prieto is a Spanish scientist known as María Blanco-Prieto. She is currently a full professor at the Department of Pharmaceutical Sciences at the University of Navarra, where she leads her own research group, 'Biomaterials and Nanomedicine'.

== Career ==
Blanco-Prieto obtained her pharmacy degree from the University of Santiago de Compostela and later earned a Ph.D. in Pharmaceutical Sciences from the University of Paris-Sud. She completed postdoctoral training at the Swiss Federal Institute of Technology (ETH) in Zürich, Switzerland. She completed her PhD fellowship at the University of Paris-Sud in Paris, France. Following her postdoctoral work, she joined the University of Navarra, where she has advanced to the position of Full Professor.

She has held leadership positions in various professional organizations. From February 2014 to February 2018, she served as Vice President of the Spanish Society of Pharmaceutics and Pharmaceutical Technology (SEFIG), and since March 2020, she has been its President. In 2018, she joined the Executive Committee of the European Federation of Pharmaceutical Scientists (EUFEPS) and has been serving as its President since 2025.

=== Research work ===
Her research centers on nanomedicine and the development of controlled drug delivery systems. She has worked on designing micro and nanoparticles for applications in treating cancer, particularly pediatric cancers, as well as cardiovascular and neurodegenerative diseases. She has authored more than 170 papers in research and has book chapters with more than 8,850 citations. She has 229 publications, and more than 53,300 reads.

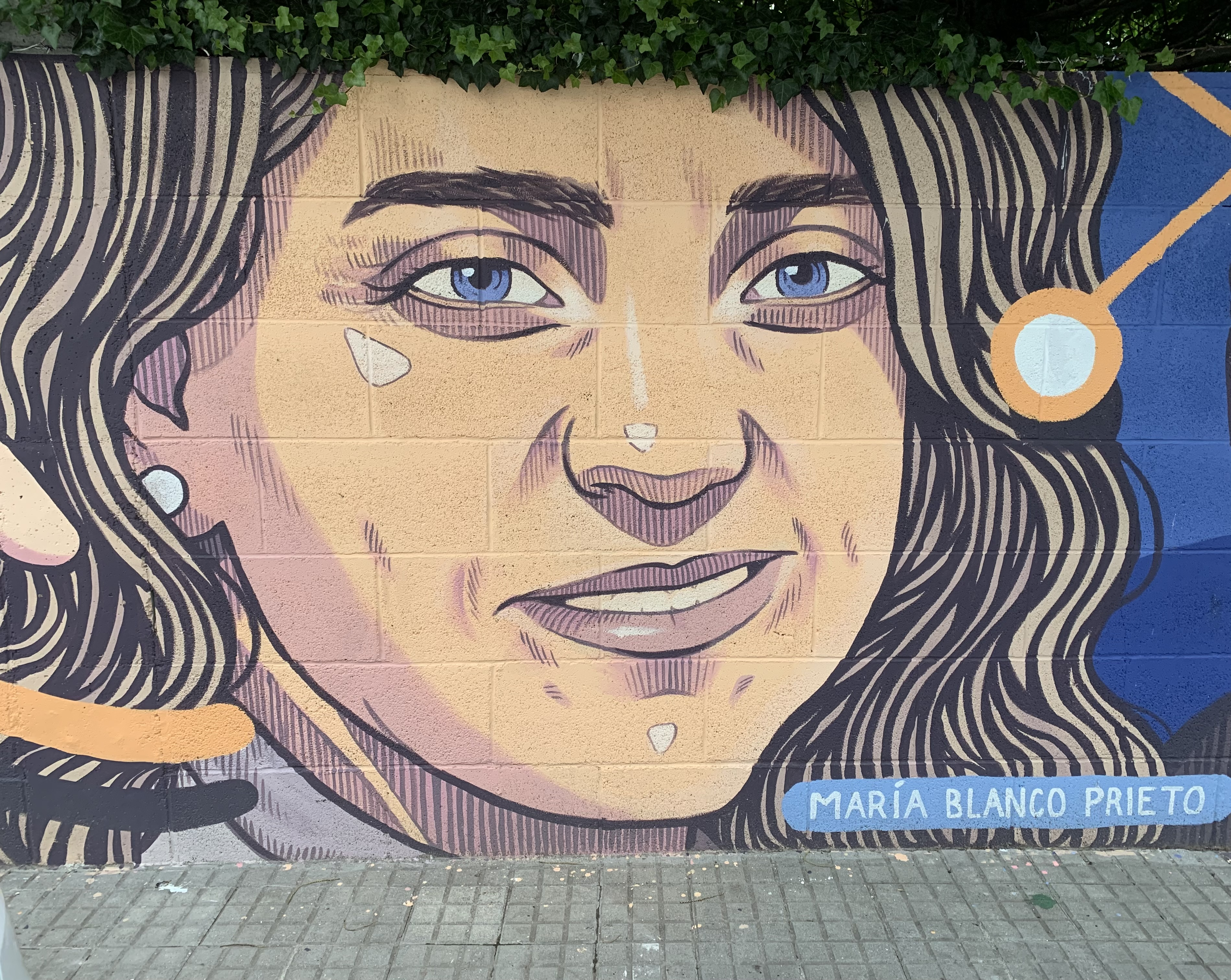
María Blanco mural in her hometown in Galicia

== Scientific outreach ==
Blanco Prieto is actively engaged in science communication and outreach. She regularly contributes to media outlets and participates in public discussions on topics such as nanomedicine, gender equity in science, and the social impact of scientific research. She frequently gives talks at schools and high schools, aiming to inspire young students, particularly girls, to pursue scientific careers.

== Recognition ==
Blanco-Prieto has been recognized with several awards, including the UPSA Laboratory Award (1994) and the Paul Neumann Award from the APGI (1997). In 2017, she was elected as a foreign corresponding member of France’s National Academy of Pharmacy and the Royal Academy of Pharmacy of Galicia. She was inducted into the American Institute for Medical and Biological Engineering (AIMBE) College of Fellows in 2022 and elected to the Academia Europaea the same year. In 2024, she was elected to France’s Académie Nationale de Médecine, notably becoming the first Spanish pharmacist admitted to the institution.
