= Grand-Camp =

Grand-Camp or Grandcamp may refer to:

- Grand-Camp, Eure, in the Eure département in France
- Grand-Camp, Seine-Maritime, in the Seine-Maritime département in France
- Grandcamp-Maisy, in the Calvados département in France
- The SS Grandcamp, a ship that exploded in the Texas City disaster
