= Arrondissement of Bernay =

Coordinates: 49°14′52″N 0°22′37″E

Bernay
- Arrondissement
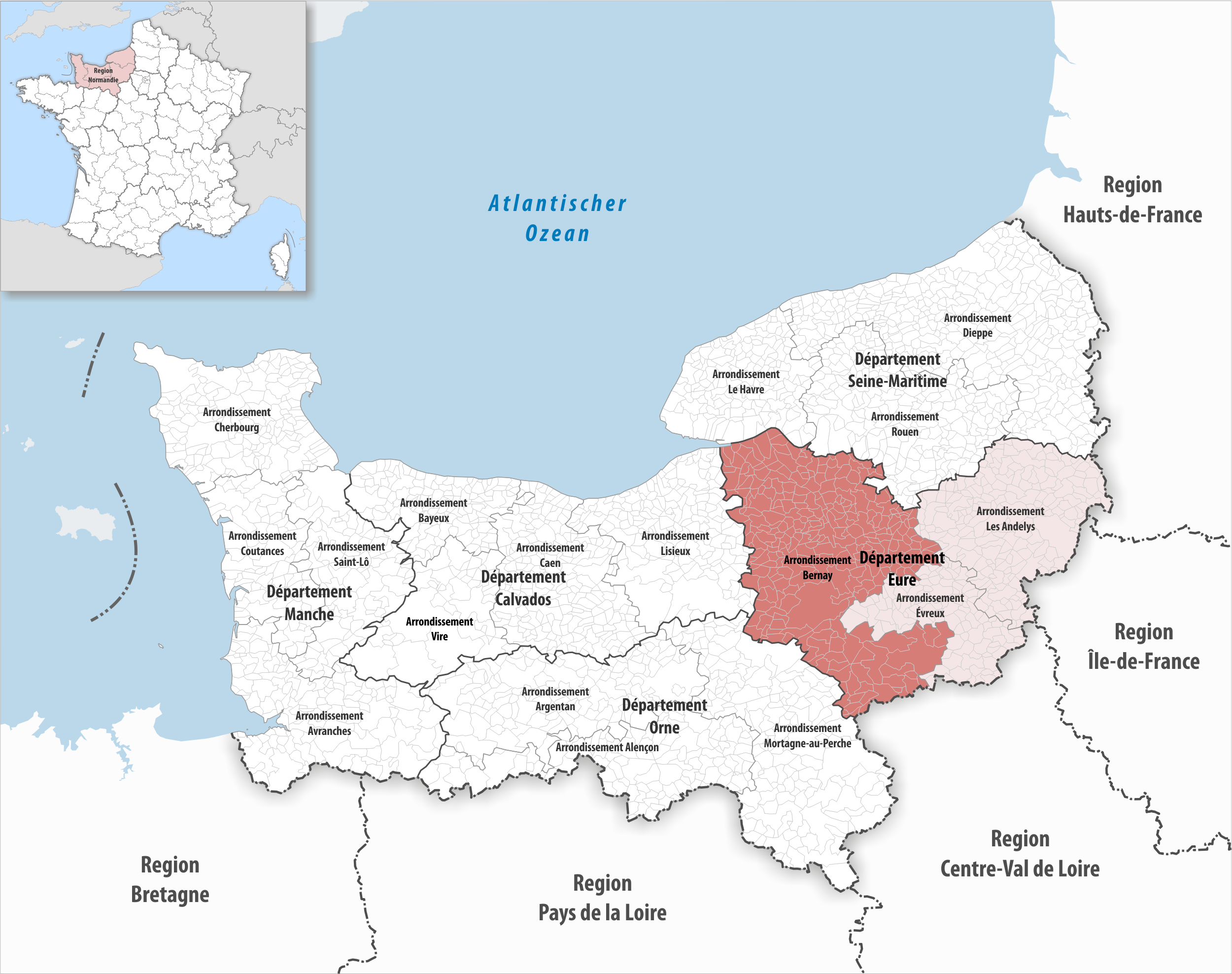
- Location within the region Normandy
- Country: France
- Region: Normandy
- Department: Eure
- No. of communes: {{{nbcomm}}}
- Area: 3,226.7 km^{2} (1,245.8 sq mi)
- Population (2023): 219,882
  - Density: 68.145/km^{2} (176.49/sq mi)
- INSEE code: 272

The arrondissement of Bernay is an arrondissement of France in the Eure department in the Normandy region. It has 297 communes. Its population is 225,284 (2021), and its area is 3,226.7 km^{2} (1,245.8 sq mi).

== Composition ==
The communes of the arrondissement of Bernay are:

- Aclou
- Aizier
- Ambenay
- Amfreville-Saint-Amand
- Appeville-Annebault
- Armentières-sur-Avre
- Asnières
- Authou
- Bacquepuis
- Bailleul-la-Vallée
- Bâlines
- Barc
- Les Barils
- Barneville-sur-Seine
- Barquet
- Barville
- Les Baux-de-Breteuil
- Bazoques
- Beaumontel
- Beaumont-le-Roger
- Le Bec-Hellouin
- Le Bec-Thomas
- Bémécourt
- Bérengeville-la-Campagne
- Bernay
- Bernienville
- Berthouville
- Berville-la-Campagne
- Berville-sur-Mer
- Beuzeville
- Bois-Anzeray
- Bois-Arnault
- Le Bois-Hellain
- Boisney
- Bois-Normand-près-Lyre
- Boissey-le-Châtel
- Boissy-Lamberville
- Bonneville-Aptot
- Le Bosc-du-Theil
- Bosgouet
- Bosrobert
- Bosroumois
- Les Bottereaux
- Boulleville
- Bouquelon
- Bouquetot
- Bourg-Achard
- Bournainville-Faverolles
- Bourneville-Sainte-Croix
- Bourth
- Bray
- Brestot
- Breteuil
- Brétigny
- Breux-sur-Avre
- Brionne
- Broglie
- Brosville
- Calleville
- Campigny
- Canappeville
- Caorches-Saint-Nicolas
- Capelle-les-Grands
- Caumont
- Cauverville-en-Roumois
- Cesseville
- Chaise-Dieu-du-Theil
- Chamblac
- Chambois
- Chambord
- La Chapelle-Bayvel
- La Chapelle-Gauthier
- La Chapelle-Hareng
- Chennebrun
- Chéronvilliers
- Colletot
- Combon
- Condé-sur-Risle
- Conteville
- Cormeilles
- Corneville-la-Fouquetière
- Corneville-sur-Risle
- Courbépine
- Courteilles
- Crestot
- Criquebeuf-la-Campagne
- Crosville-la-Vieille
- Daubeuf-la-Campagne
- Drucourt
- Duranville
- Écaquelon
- Écardenville-la-Campagne
- Écauville
- Ecquetot
- Émanville
- Épaignes
- Épégard
- Épreville-en-Lieuvin
- Épreville-près-le-Neubourg
- Étréville
- Éturqueraye
- Fatouville-Grestain
- Le Favril
- Ferrières-Saint-Hilaire
- Feuguerolles
- Fiquefleur-Équainville
- Flancourt-Crescy-en-Roumois
- Folleville
- Fontaine-l'Abbé
- Fontaine-la-Louvet
- Fort-Moville
- Foulbec
- Fouqueville
- Franqueville
- Freneuse-sur-Risle
- Fresne-Cauverville
- Giverville
- Glos-sur-Risle
- La Goulafrière
- Goupil-Othon
- Gournay-le-Guérin
- Grand-Bourgtheroulde
- Grand-Camp
- Graveron-Sémerville
- Grosley-sur-Risle
- Harcourt
- La Harengère
- Hauville
- La Haye-Aubrée
- La Haye-de-Calleville
- La Haye-de-Routot
- La Haye-du-Theil
- La Haye-Saint-Sylvestre
- Hecmanville
- Hectomare
- Heudreville-en-Lieuvin
- Hondouville
- Honguemare-Guenouville
- L'Hosmes
- La Houssaye
- Houetteville
- Illeville-sur-Montfort
- Iville
- Juignettes
- La Lande-Saint-Léger
- Le Landin
- Launay
- Le Lesme
- Lieurey
- Livet-sur-Authou
- Malleville-sur-le-Bec
- Malouy
- Mandeville
- Mandres
- Manneville-la-Raoult
- Manneville-sur-Risle
- Marais-Vernier
- Marbeuf
- Marbois
- Martainville
- Mélicourt
- Menneval
- Mesnil-en-Ouche
- Mesnil-Rousset
- Le Mesnil-Saint-Jean
- Mesnils-sur-Iton
- Montfort-sur-Risle
- Montreuil-l'Argillé
- Les Monts du Roumois
- Morainville-Jouveaux
- Morsan
- Nassandres sur Risle
- Neaufles-Auvergny
- Le Neubourg
- La Neuve-Lyre
- La Neuville-du-Bosc
- Neuville-sur-Authou
- Noards
- La Noë-Poulain
- Notre-Dame-d'Épine
- Notre-Dame-du-Hamel
- Le Noyer-en-Ouche
- Le Perrey
- Piencourt
- Piseux
- Les Places
- Plainville
- Le Planquay
- Plasnes
- Le Plessis-Sainte-Opportune
- Pont-Audemer
- Pont-Authou
- La Poterie-Mathieu
- Les Préaux
- Pullay
- La Pyle
- Quillebeuf-sur-Seine
- Quittebeuf
- Romilly-la-Puthenaye
- Rougemontiers
- Rouge-Perriers
- Routot
- Rugles
- Saint-Agnan-de-Cernières
- Saint-Antonin-de-Sommaire
- Saint-Aubin-d'Écrosville
- Saint-Aubin-de-Scellon
- Saint-Aubin-du-Thenney
- Saint-Aubin-sur-Quillebeuf
- Saint-Benoît-des-Ombres
- Saint-Christophe-sur-Avre
- Saint-Christophe-sur-Condé
- Saint-Cyr-de-Salerne
- Saint-Cyr-la-Campagne
- Saint-Denis-d'Augerons
- Saint-Denis-des-Monts
- Saint-Didier-des-Bois
- Sainte-Colombe-la-Commanderie
- Saint-Éloi-de-Fourques
- Sainte-Marie-d'Attez
- Sainte-Opportune-du-Bosc
- Sainte-Opportune-la-Mare
- Saint-Étienne-l'Allier
- Saint-Georges-du-Vièvre
- Saint-Germain-de-Pasquier
- Saint-Germain-la-Campagne
- Saint-Grégoire-du-Vièvre
- Saint-Jean-du-Thenney
- Saint-Laurent-du-Tencement
- Saint-Léger-de-Rôtes
- Saint-Léger-du-Gennetey
- Saint-Maclou
- Saint-Mards-de-Blacarville
- Saint-Mards-de-Fresne
- Saint-Martin-du-Tilleul
- Saint-Martin-Saint-Firmin
- Saint-Meslin-du-Bosc
- Saint-Ouen-de-Pontcheuil
- Saint-Ouen-de-Thouberville
- Saint-Ouen-du-Tilleul
- Saint-Paul-de-Fourques
- Saint-Philbert-sur-Boissey
- Saint-Philbert-sur-Risle
- Saint-Pierre-de-Cernières
- Saint-Pierre-de-Cormeilles
- Saint-Pierre-de-Salerne
- Saint-Pierre-des-Fleurs
- Saint-Pierre-des-Ifs
- Saint-Pierre-du-Bosguérard
- Saint-Pierre-du-Val
- Saint-Samson-de-la-Roque
- Saint-Siméon
- Saint-Sulpice-de-Grimbouville
- Saint-Sylvestre-de-Cormeilles
- Saint-Symphorien
- Saint-Victor-de-Chrétienville
- Saint-Victor-d'Épine
- Saint-Victor-sur-Avre
- Saint-Vincent-du-Boulay
- La Saussaye
- Selles
- Serquigny
- Sylvains-Lès-Moulins
- Le Theil-Nolent
- Thénouville
- Thiberville
- Thibouville
- Thierville
- Le Thuit-de-l'Oison
- Le Tilleul-Lambert
- Tillières-sur-Avre
- Tocqueville
- Le Torpt
- Tournedos-Bois-Hubert
- Tourville-la-Campagne
- Tourville-sur-Pont-Audemer
- Toutainville
- Treis-Sants-en-Ouche
- Le Tremblay-Omonville
- La Trinité-de-Réville
- La Trinité-de-Thouberville
- Triqueville
- Le Troncq
- Trouville-la-Haule
- Valailles
- Valletot
- Vannecrocq
- Venon
- Verneuil d'Avre et d'Iton
- Verneusses
- La Vieille-Lyre
- Vieux-Port
- Villettes
- Villez-sur-le-Neubourg
- Vitot
- Voiscreville
- Vraiville

== History ==
The arrondissement of Bernay was created in 1800. It was expanded in 2006 with the canton of Amfreville-la-Campagne from the arrondissement of Évreux. At the January 2017 reorganisation of the arrondissements of Eure, it gained 77 communes from the arrondissement of Évreux and one commune from the arrondissement of Les Andelys, and it lost one commune to the arrondissement of Évreux.

As a result of the reorganisation of the cantons of France which came into effect in 2015, the borders of the cantons are no longer related to the borders of the arrondissements. The cantons of the arrondissement of Bernay were, as of January 2015:

- Amfreville-la-Campagne
- Beaumesnil
- Beaumont-le-Roger
- Bernay-Est
- Bernay-Ouest
- Beuzeville
- Bourgtheroulde-Infreville
- Brionne
- Broglie
- Cormeilles
- Montfort-sur-Risle
- Pont-Audemer
- Quillebeuf-sur-Seine
- Routot
- Saint-Georges-du-Vièvre
- Thiberville
