= La Chapelle-Gauthier =

La Chapelle-Gauthier may refer to the following communes in France:

- La Chapelle-Gauthier, Eure, in the Eure département
- La Chapelle-Gauthier, Seine-et-Marne, in the Seine-et-Marne département
