= Capelle-les-Grands =

- Commune
- Location of Capelle-les-Grands
- Location within France Location within Normandy
- Coordinates: 49°02′49″N 0°28′30″E
- Country: France
- Region: Normandy
- Department: Eure
- Arrondissement: Bernay
- Canton: Breteuil

Government
  - Mayor (2020–2026): Patrick Hautechaud
- Area^{1}: 13.39 km^{2} (5.17 sq mi)
- Elevation: 190 m (620 ft)
- Highest elevation: 197 m (646 ft)
- Lowest elevation: 176 m (577 ft)
- Population (2023): 434
  - Density: 32.4/km^{2} (83.9/sq mi)
- Time zone: UTC+01:00 (CET)
  - Summer (DST): UTC+02:00 (CEST)
- INSEE/Postal code: 27130 /27270
- ^{1} French Land Register data, which excludes lakes, ponds, glaciers > 1 km^{2} (0.386 sq mi or 247 acres) and river estuaries.

Capelle-les-Grands (French pronunciation: [kapɛl le ɡʁɑ̃]) is a commune in the Eure department in northern France.

== Population ==
Historical population
Year	Pop.	±% p.a.
1968	408	—
1975	370	−1.39%
1982	307	−2.63%
1990	331	+0.95%
1999	359	+0.91%
2007	384	+0.85%
2012	423	+1.95%
2017	428	+0.24%
2023	434	+0.23%
Source: INSEE

== See also ==
- Communes of the Eure department
