= La Neuve-Lyre =

- Commune
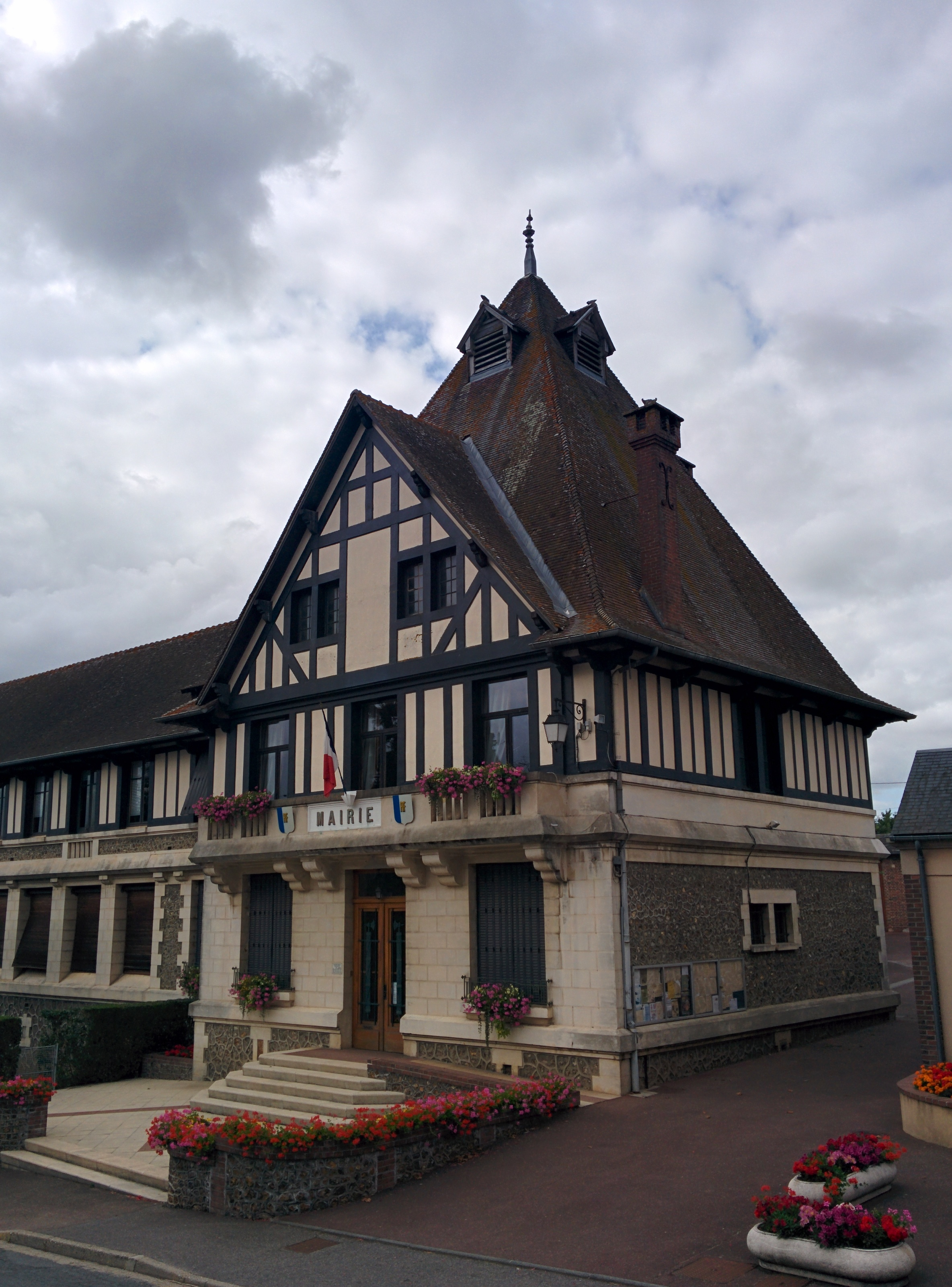
- The town hall in La Neuve-Lyre

- Coat of arms
- Location of La Neuve-Lyre
- Location within France Location within Normandy
- Coordinates: 48°54′33″N 0°44′55″E
- Country: France
- Region: Normandy
- Department: Eure
- Arrondissement: Bernay
- Canton: Breteuil

Government
  - Mayor (2020–2026): Chantal Topart
- Area^{1}: 2.85 km^{2} (1.10 sq mi)
- Elevation: 174 m (571 ft)
- Highest elevation: 181 m (594 ft)
- Lowest elevation: 150 m (490 ft)
- Population (2023): 511
  - Density: 179/km^{2} (464/sq mi)
- Time zone: UTC+01:00 (CET)
  - Summer (DST): UTC+02:00 (CEST)
- INSEE/Postal code: 27431 /27330
- ^{1} French Land Register data, which excludes lakes, ponds, glaciers > 1 km^{2} (0.386 sq mi or 247 acres) and river estuaries.

La Neuve-Lyre (French pronunciation: [la nœv liʁ], lit. 'The New Lyre') is a commune in the Eure department in Normandy in northern France. It is on the D830 road between Evreux and L'Aigle.

== Geography ==
The commune, along with another 69 communes, shares part of a 4,747 hectare Natura 2000 conservation area called Risle, Guiel, Charentonne.

== Population ==
Historical population
Year	Pop.	±% p.a.
1968	724	—
1975	802	+1.47%
1982	712	−1.69%
1990	598	−2.16%
1999	567	−0.59%
2007	607	+0.86%
2012	583	−0.80%
2017	573	−0.35%
2023	511	−1.89%
Source: INSEE

== See also ==
- Communes of the Eure department
