= La Goulafrière =

- Commune
- Coat of arms
- Location of La Goulafrière
- Location within France Location within Normandy
- Coordinates: 48°57′03″N 0°26′15″E
- Country: France
- Region: Normandy
- Department: Eure
- Arrondissement: Bernay
- Canton: Breteuil

Government
  - Mayor (2020–2026): Jean-Claude Daniel
- Area^{1}: 14.38 km^{2} (5.55 sq mi)
- Elevation: 281 m (922 ft)
- Highest elevation: 222 m (728 ft)
- Lowest elevation: 155 m (509 ft)
- Population (2023): 170
  - Density: 12/km^{2} (31/sq mi)
- Time zone: UTC+01:00 (CET)
  - Summer (DST): UTC+02:00 (CEST)
- INSEE/Postal code: 27289 /27390
- ^{1} French Land Register data, which excludes lakes, ponds, glaciers > 1 km^{2} (0.386 sq mi or 247 acres) and river estuaries.

La Goulafrière (French pronunciation: [la ɡulafʁijɛʁ]) is a commune in the Eure department in northern France.

== Population ==
Historical population
Year	Pop.	±% p.a.
1968	279	—
1975	220	−3.34%
1982	173	−3.38%
1990	158	−1.13%
1999	150	−0.58%
2007	167	+1.35%
2012	172	+0.59%
2017	165	−0.83%
2023	170	+0.50%
Source: INSEE

== See also ==
- Communes of the Eure department
