= Montreuil-l'Argillé =

- Commune
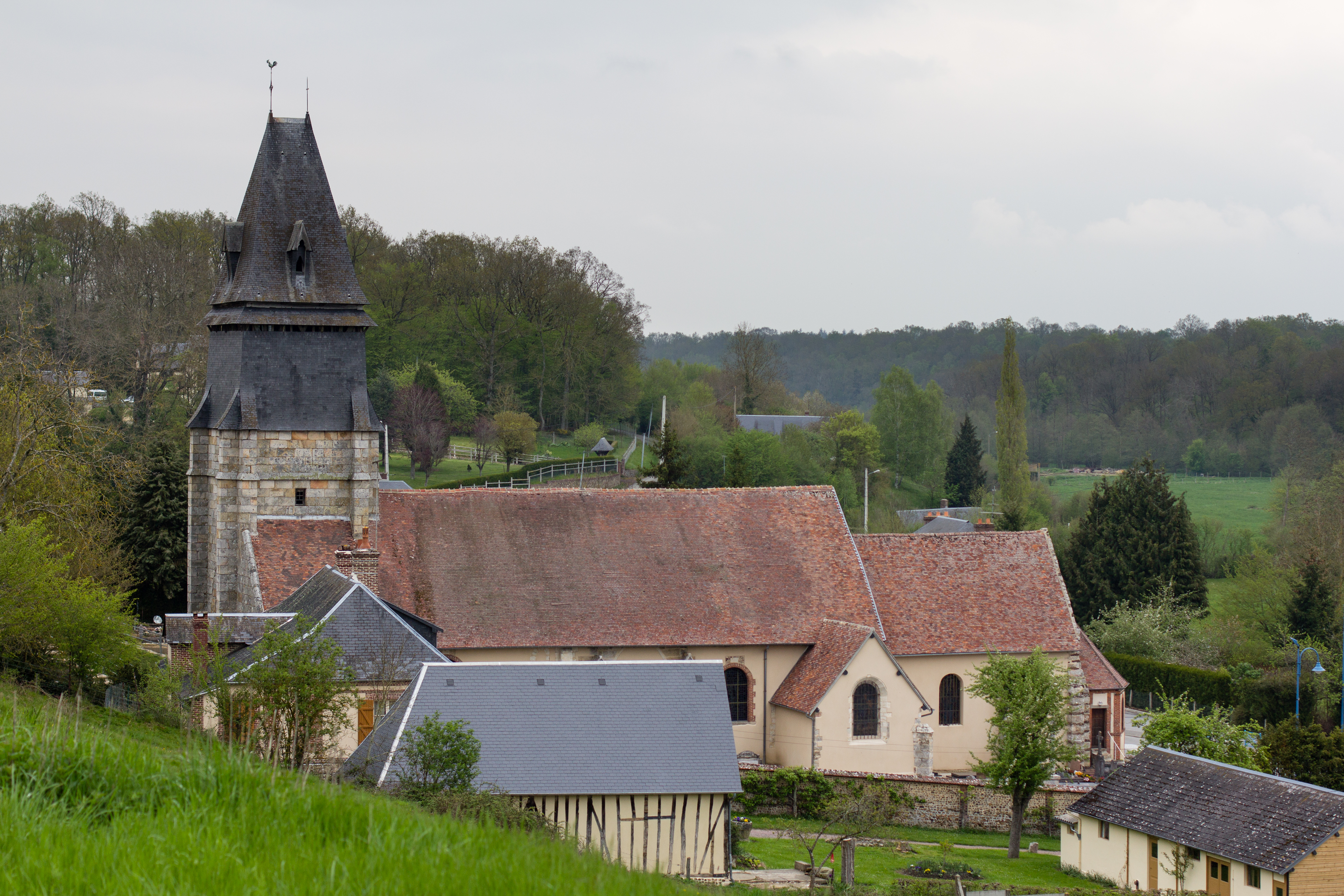
- The church in Montreuil-l'Argillé

- Coat of arms
- Location of Montreuil-l'Argillé
- Location within France Location within Normandy
- Coordinates: 48°56′22″N 0°28′53″E
- Country: France
- Region: Normandy
- Department: Eure
- Arrondissement: Bernay
- Canton: Breteuil

Government
  - Mayor (2020–2026): Jean-Louis Groult
- Area^{1}: 13.72 km^{2} (5.30 sq mi)
- Elevation: 172 m (564 ft)
- Highest elevation: 225 m (738 ft)
- Lowest elevation: 161 m (528 ft)
- Population (2023): 783
  - Density: 57.1/km^{2} (148/sq mi)
- Time zone: UTC+01:00 (CET)
  - Summer (DST): UTC+02:00 (CEST)
- INSEE/Postal code: 27414 /27390
- ^{1} French Land Register data, which excludes lakes, ponds, glaciers > 1 km^{2} (0.386 sq mi or 247 acres) and river estuaries.

Montreuil-l'Argillé (French pronunciation: [mɔ̃tʁœj laʁʒije]) is a commune in the Eure department in Normandy in northern France.

== Geography ==
The commune along with another 69 communes shares part of a 4,747 hectare, Natura 2000 conservation area, called Risle, Guiel, Charentonne.

== Population ==
Historical population
Year	Pop.	±% p.a.
1968	755	—
1975	773	+0.34%
1982	726	−0.89%
1990	706	−0.35%
1999	740	+0.52%
2007	781	+0.68%
2012	796	+0.38%
2017	823	+0.67%
2023	783	−0.83%
Source: INSEE

== See also ==
- Communes of the Eure department
