= Saint-Aubin-du-Thenney =

- Commune
- Location of Saint-Aubin-du-Thenney
- Location within France Location within Normandy
- Coordinates: 49°01′17″N 0°29′25″E
- Country: France
- Region: Normandy
- Department: Eure
- Arrondissement: Bernay
- Canton: Breteuil

Government
  - Mayor (2020–2026): Nadia Nadaud
- Area^{1}: 13.96 km^{2} (5.39 sq mi)
- Elevation: 198 m (650 ft)
- Highest elevation: 198 m (650 ft)
- Lowest elevation: 169 m (554 ft)
- Population (2023): 346
  - Density: 24.8/km^{2} (64.2/sq mi)
- Time zone: UTC+01:00 (CET)
  - Summer (DST): UTC+02:00 (CEST)
- INSEE/Postal code: 27514 /27270
- ^{1} French Land Register data, which excludes lakes, ponds, glaciers > 1 km^{2} (0.386 sq mi or 247 acres) and river estuaries.

Saint-Aubin-du-Thenney (French pronunciation: [sɛ̃.t‿obɛ̃ dy tɛne]) is a commune in the Eure department in Normandy in northern France.

== Population ==
Historical population
Year	Pop.	±% p.a.
1968	345	—
1975	307	−1.65%
1982	329	+0.99%
1990	300	−1.15%
1999	322	+0.79%
2007	349	+1.01%
2012	360	+0.62%
2017	373	+0.71%
2023	346	−1.24%
Source: INSEE

== See also ==
- Communes of the Eure department
