= Les Bottereaux =

Commune in Normandy, France

- Commune
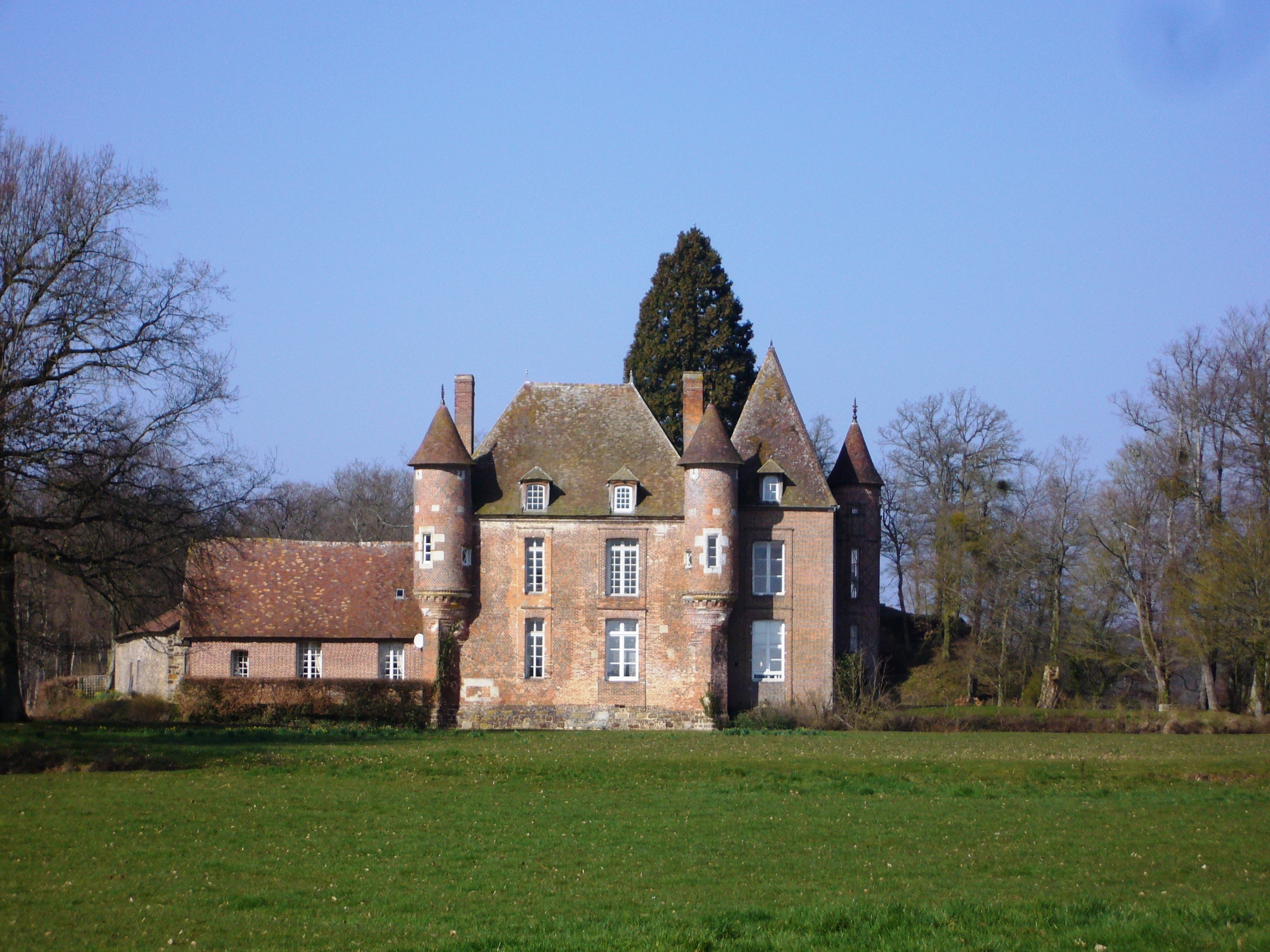
- Rebais Castle at Les Bottereaux
- Location of Les Bottereaux
- Location within France Location within Normandy
- Coordinates: 48°52′23″N 0°40′09″E
- Country: France
- Region: Normandy
- Department: Eure
- Arrondissement: Bernay
- Canton: Breteuil
- Intercommunality: Normandie Sud Eure

Government
  - Mayor (2020–2026): Pauline Moutonnet
- Area^{1}: 22.13 km^{2} (8.54 sq mi)
- Elevation: 191 m (627 ft)
- Highest elevation: 229 m (751 ft)
- Lowest elevation: 171 m (561 ft)
- Population (2023): 351
  - Density: 15.9/km^{2} (41.1/sq mi)
- Time zone: UTC+01:00 (CET)
  - Summer (DST): UTC+02:00 (CEST)
- INSEE/Postal code: 27096 /27250
- ^{1} French Land Register data, which excludes lakes, ponds, glaciers > 1 km^{2} (0.386 sq mi or 247 acres) and river estuaries.

Les Bottereaux (French pronunciation: [le bɔtʁo]) is a commune in the Eure department in Normandy in northern France. The Anglo-Norman family of the Barons Botreaux probably originated here. A possible translation of the name is "the toads", but it is more likely derived from boutière, meaning "extremity of a piece of land".

== Population ==
Historical population
Year	Pop.	±% p.a.
1968	281	—
1975	274	−0.36%
1982	248	−1.41%
1990	260	+0.59%
1999	250	−0.43%
2007	309	+2.68%
2012	347	+2.35%
2017	349	+0.12%
2023	351	+0.10%
Source: INSEE

== See also ==
- Communes of the Eure department
