= Saint-Laurent-du-Tencement =

- Commune
- Location of Saint-Laurent-du-Tencement
- Location within France Location within Normandy
- Coordinates: 48°53′07″N 0°27′22″E
- Country: France
- Region: Normandy
- Department: Eure
- Arrondissement: Bernay
- Canton: Breteuil

Government
  - Mayor (2020–2026): Jean-Marie Gosse
- Area^{1}: 2.76 km^{2} (1.07 sq mi)
- Elevation: 232 m (761 ft)
- Highest elevation: 230 m (750 ft)
- Lowest elevation: 185 m (607 ft)
- Population (2023): 68
  - Density: 25/km^{2} (64/sq mi)
- Time zone: UTC+01:00 (CET)
  - Summer (DST): UTC+02:00 (CEST)
- INSEE/Postal code: 27556 /27390
- ^{1} French Land Register data, which excludes lakes, ponds, glaciers > 1 km^{2} (0.386 sq mi or 247 acres) and river estuaries.

Saint-Laurent-du-Tencement (French pronunciation: [sɛ̃ loʁɑ̃ dy tɑ̃smɑ̃]) is a commune in the Eure department in Normandy in northern France.

== Geography ==
The commune along with another 69 communes shares part of a 4,747 hectare, Natura 2000 conservation area, called Risle, Guiel, Charentonne.

== Population ==
Historical population
Year	Pop.	±% p.a.
1968	49	—
1975	50	+0.29%
1982	38	−3.84%
1990	34	−1.38%
1999	49	+4.14%
2007	50	+0.25%
2012	53	+1.17%
2017	64	+3.84%
2023	68	+1.02%
Source: INSEE

== See also ==
- Communes of the Eure department
