= Saint-Pierre-de-Cernières =

- Commune
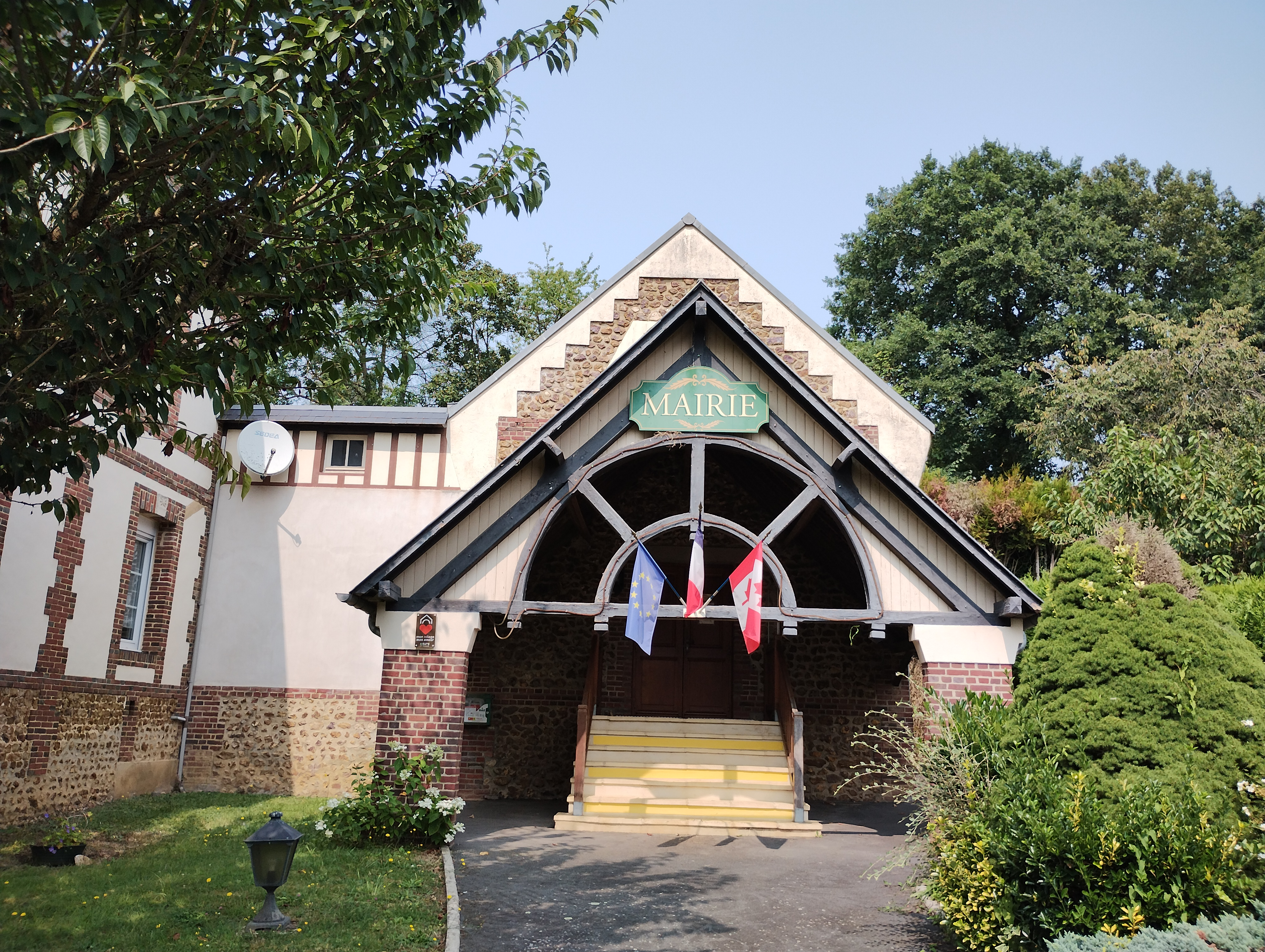
- Saint-Pierre-de-Cernières mairie Town hall
- Location of Saint-Pierre-de-Cernières
- Location within France Location within Normandy
- Coordinates: 48°56′47″N 0°30′59″E
- Country: France
- Region: Normandy
- Department: Eure
- Arrondissement: Bernay
- Canton: Breteuil

Government
  - Mayor (2020–2026): Claude Spohr
- Area^{1}: 11.62 km^{2} (4.49 sq mi)
- Elevation: 164 m (538 ft)
- Highest elevation: 216 m (709 ft)
- Lowest elevation: 161 m (528 ft)
- Population (2023): 228
  - Density: 19.6/km^{2} (50.8/sq mi)
- Time zone: UTC+01:00 (CET)
  - Summer (DST): UTC+02:00 (CEST)
- INSEE/Postal code: 27590 /27390
- ^{1} French Land Register data, which excludes lakes, ponds, glaciers > 1 km^{2} (0.386 sq mi or 247 acres) and river estuaries.

Saint-Pierre-de-Cernières (French pronunciation: [sɛ̃ pjɛʁ də sɛʁnjɛʁ]) is a commune in the Eure department in Normandy in northern France.

== Geography ==
The commune along with another 69 communes shares part of a 4,747 hectare, Natura 2000 conservation area, called Risle, Guiel, Charentonne.

== Population ==
Historical population
| Year | Pop. | ±% p.a. |
|---|---|---|
| 1968 | 301 | — |
| 1975 | 271 | −1.49% |
| 1982 | 245 | −1.43% |
| 1990 | 186 | −3.39% |
| 1999 | 197 | +0.64% |
| 2007 | 221 | +1.45% |
| 2012 | 228 | +0.63% |
| 2017 | 225 | −0.26% |
| 2023 | 228 | +0.22% |
Source: INSEE

== See also ==
- Communes of the Eure department
