= Mélicourt =

- Commune
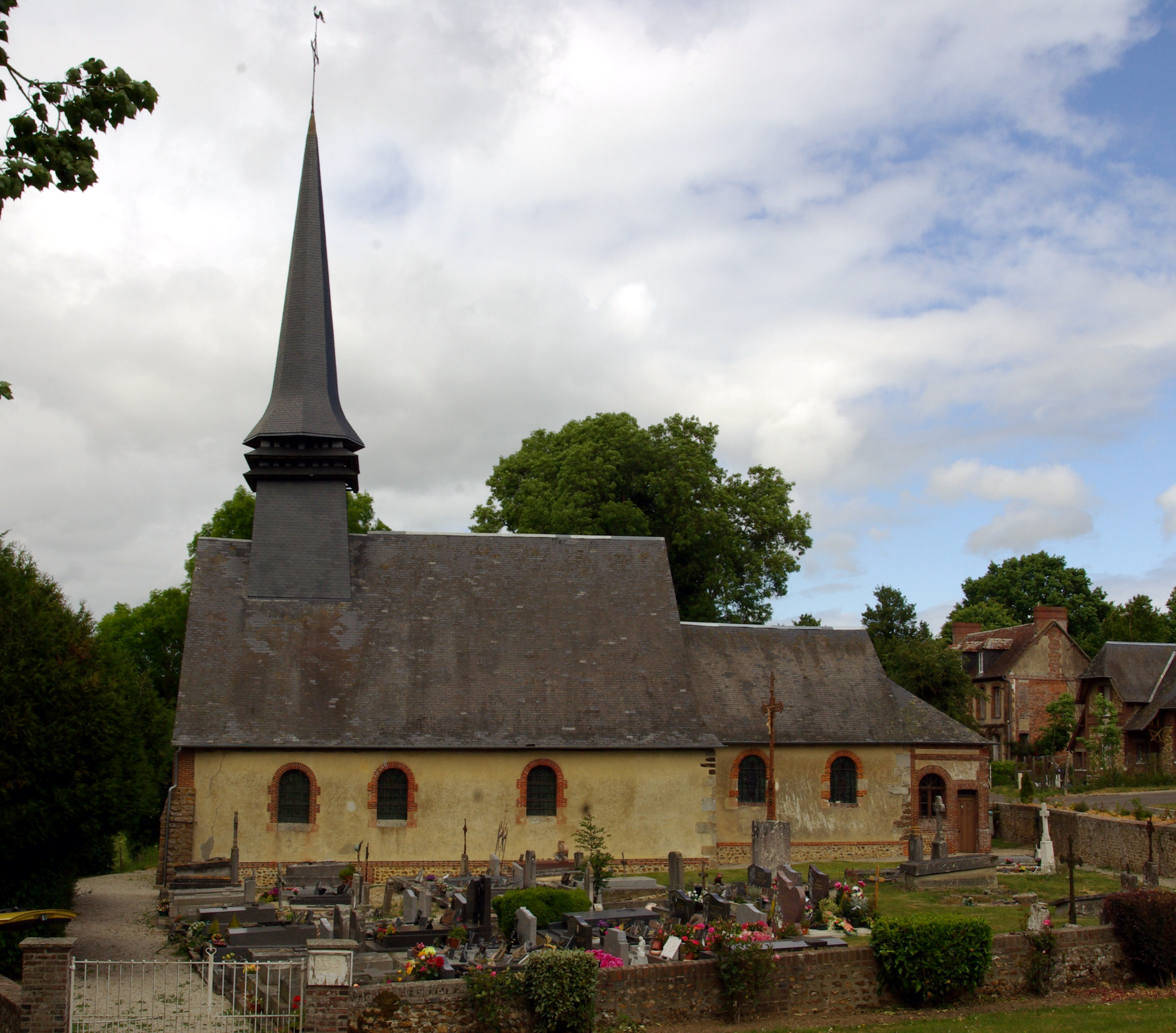
- The church in Mélicourt
- Location of Mélicourt
- Location within France Location within Normandy
- Coordinates: 48°54′55″N 0°30′22″E
- Country: France
- Region: Normandy
- Department: Eure
- Arrondissement: Bernay
- Canton: Breteuil

Government
  - Mayor (2020–2026): Caroline Beaumont
- Area^{1}: 6.4 km^{2} (2.5 sq mi)
- Elevation: 224 m (735 ft)
- Highest elevation: 223 m (732 ft)
- Lowest elevation: 174 m (571 ft)
- Population (2023): 87
  - Density: 14/km^{2} (35/sq mi)
- Time zone: UTC+01:00 (CET)
  - Summer (DST): UTC+02:00 (CEST)
- INSEE/Postal code: 27395 /27390
- ^{1} French Land Register data, which excludes lakes, ponds, glaciers > 1 km^{2} (0.386 sq mi or 247 acres) and river estuaries.

Mélicourt (French pronunciation: [melikuʁ]) is a commune in the Eure department and Normandy region of France.

== Geography ==
The commune along with another 69 communes shares part of a 4,747 hectare, Natura 2000 conservation area, called Risle, Guiel, Charentonne.

== Population ==
Historical population
Year	Pop.	±% p.a.
1968	114	—
1975	129	+1.78%
1982	112	−2.00%
1990	80	−4.12%
1999	71	−1.32%
2007	91	+3.15%
2012	95	+0.86%
2017	83	−2.66%
2023	87	+0.79%
Source: INSEE

== See also ==
- Communes of the Eure department
