= Neaufles-Auvergny =

- Commune
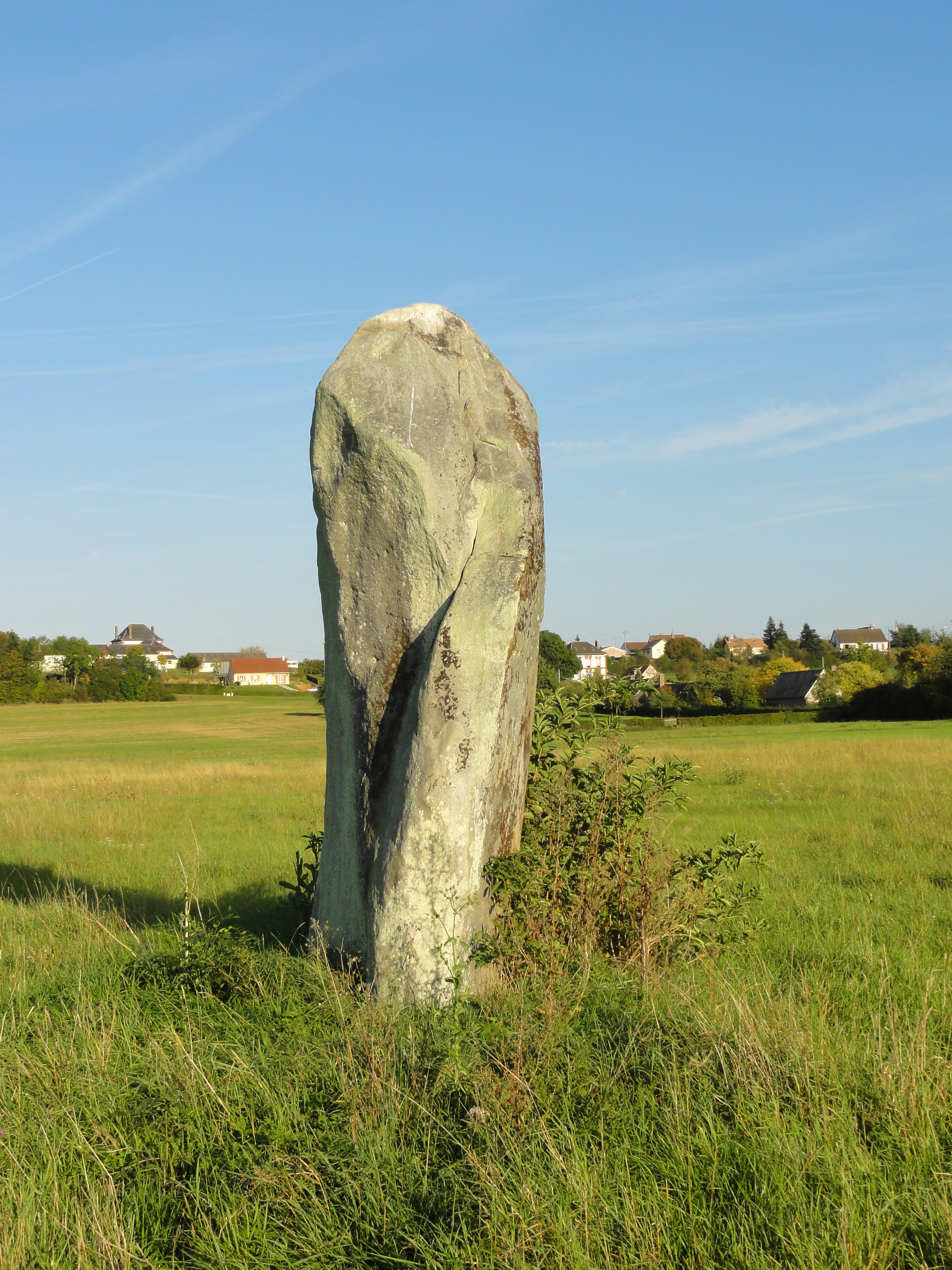
- Menhir
- Location of Neaufles-Auvergny
- Location within France Location within Normandy
- Coordinates: 48°51′58″N 0°44′08″E
- Country: France
- Region: Normandy
- Department: Eure
- Arrondissement: Bernay
- Canton: Breteuil

Government
  - Mayor (2020–2026): Geneviève Sas
- Area^{1}: 17.35 km^{2} (6.70 sq mi)
- Elevation: 187 m (614 ft)
- Highest elevation: 203 m (666 ft)
- Lowest elevation: 155 m (509 ft)
- Population (2023): 410
  - Density: 24/km^{2} (61/sq mi)
- Time zone: UTC+01:00 (CET)
  - Summer (DST): UTC+02:00 (CEST)
- INSEE/Postal code: 27427 /27250
- ^{1} French Land Register data, which excludes lakes, ponds, glaciers > 1 km^{2} (0.386 sq mi or 247 acres) and river estuaries.

Neaufles-Auvergny (French pronunciation: [nofl ovɛʁɲi]) is a commune in the Eure department in Normandy in northern France.

== Geography ==
The commune along with another 69 communes shares part of a 4,747 hectare, Natura 2000 conservation area, called Risle, Guiel, Charentonne.

== Population ==
Historical population
Year	Pop.	±% p.a.
1968	434	—
1975	449	+0.49%
1982	405	−1.46%
1990	476	+2.04%
1999	395	−2.05%
2007	429	+1.04%
2012	426	−0.14%
2017	423	−0.14%
2023	410	−0.52%
Source: INSEE

== See also ==
- Communes of the Eure department
