= Bémécourt =

- Commune
- Location of Bémécourt
- Location within France Location within Normandy
- Coordinates: 48°50′43″N 0°52′34″E
- Country: France
- Region: Normandy
- Department: Eure
- Arrondissement: Bernay
- Canton: Breteuil

Government
  - Mayor (2020–2026): Raymond Cornet
- Area^{1}: 17.11 km^{2} (6.61 sq mi)
- Elevation: 185 m (607 ft)
- Highest elevation: 196 m (643 ft)
- Lowest elevation: 163 m (535 ft)
- Population (2023): 544
  - Density: 31.8/km^{2} (82.3/sq mi)
- Time zone: UTC+01:00 (CET)
  - Summer (DST): UTC+02:00 (CEST)
- INSEE/Postal code: 27054 /27160
- ^{1} French Land Register data, which excludes lakes, ponds, glaciers > 1 km^{2} (0.386 sq mi or 247 acres) and river estuaries.

Bémécourt (French pronunciation: [bemekuʁ]) is a commune in the Eure department and Normandy region of France.

== Population ==
Historical population
| Year | Pop. | ±% p.a. |
|---|---|---|
| 1968 | 292 | — |
| 1975 | 394 | +4.37% |
| 1982 | 328 | −2.59% |
| 1990 | 414 | +2.95% |
| 1999 | 456 | +1.08% |
| 2007 | 464 | +0.22% |
| 2012 | 490 | +1.10% |
| 2017 | 576 | +3.29% |
| 2023 | 544 | −0.95% |
Source: INSEE

== See also ==
- Communes of the Eure department
