= Ambenay =

- Commune
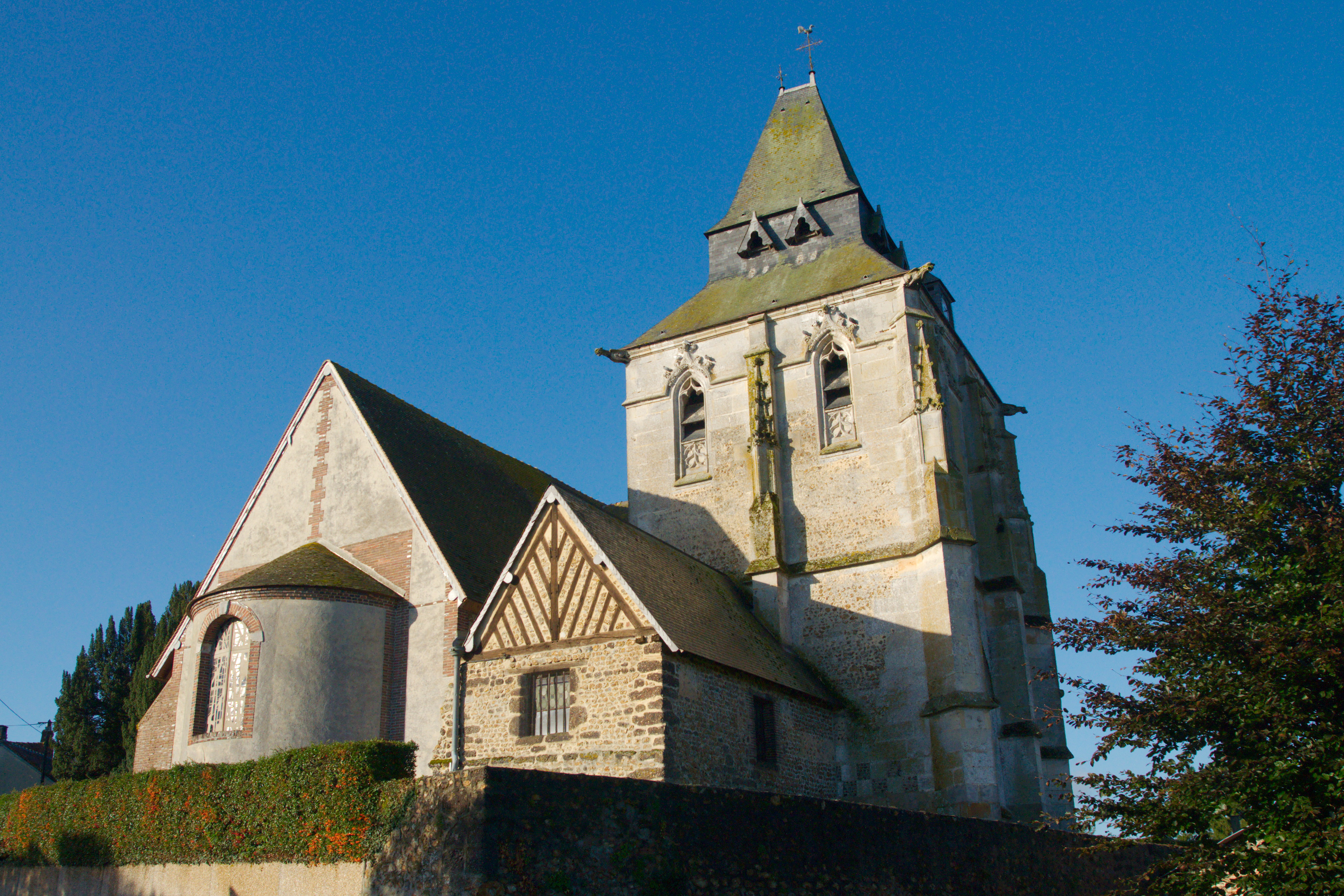
- The church in Ambenay
- Location of Ambenay
- Location within France Location within Normandy
- Coordinates: 48°50′N 0°44′E
- Country: France
- Region: Normandy
- Department: Eure
- Arrondissement: Bernay
- Canton: Breteuil
- Intercommunality: Normandie Sud Eure

Government
  - Mayor (2020–2026): Sylvie Cormier
- Area^{1}: 16.8 km^{2} (6.5 sq mi)
- Elevation: 205 m (673 ft)
- Highest elevation: 213 m (699 ft)
- Lowest elevation: 165 m (541 ft)
- Population (2023): 544
  - Density: 32.4/km^{2} (83.9/sq mi)
- Time zone: UTC+01:00 (CET)
  - Summer (DST): UTC+02:00 (CEST)
- INSEE/Postal code: 27009 /27250
- ^{1} French Land Register data, which excludes lakes, ponds, glaciers > 1 km^{2} (0.386 sq mi or 247 acres) and river estuaries.

Ambenay is a commune in the Eure department in Normandy in northern France.

== Geography ==
The commune along with another 69 communes shares part of a 4,747 hectare, Natura 2000 conservation area, called Risle, Guiel, Charentonne.

== Population ==
Historical population
Year	Pop.	±% p.a.
1968	502	—
1975	535	+0.91%
1982	471	−1.80%
1990	512	+1.05%
1999	465	−1.06%
2007	493	+0.73%
2012	580	+3.30%
2017	566	−0.49%
2023	544	−0.66%
Source: INSEE

== See also ==
- Communes of the Eure department
