= Communes of the Eure department =

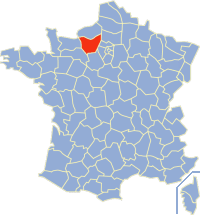

The following is a list of the 585 communes of the Eure department of France.

The communes cooperate in the following intercommunalities (as of 2025):

- CA Évreux Portes de Normandie
- Communauté d'agglomération du Pays de Dreux (partly)
- Communauté d'agglomération Seine-Eure
- CA Seine Normandie Agglomération
- Communauté de communes des 4 rivières (partly)
- Communauté de communes Intercom Bernay Terres de Normandie
- Communauté de communes Interco Normandie Sud Eure (partly)
- Communauté de communes Lieuvin Pays d'Auge
- Communauté de communes Lyons Andelle
- Communauté de communes du Pays de Conches
- Communauté de communes du Pays de Honfleur-Beuzeville (partly)
- Communauté de communes du Pays du Neubourg
- Communauté de communes de Pont-Audemer / Val de Risle
- Communauté de communes Roumois Seine (partly)
- Communauté de communes du Vexin Normand

INSEE	Postal	Commune
27001	27800	Aclou
27002	27570	Acon
27003	27400	Acquigny
27004	27120	Aigleville
27005	27600	Ailly
27006	27500	Aizier
27008	27460	Alizay
27009	27250	Ambenay
27010	27140	Amécourt
27012	27380	Amfreville-les-Champs
27011	27370	Amfreville-Saint-Amand
27013	27380	Amfreville-sous-les-Monts
27014	27400	Amfreville-sur-Iton
27015	27430	Andé
27016	27700	Les Andelys
27017	27930	Angerville-la-Campagne
27018	27290	Appeville-Annebault
27019	27820	Armentières-sur-Avre
27020	27180	Arnières-sur-Iton
27021	27260	Asnières
27023	27180	Aulnay-sur-Iton
27025	27490	Autheuil-Authouillet
27026	27420	Authevernes
27027	27220	Les Authieux
27028	27290	Authou
27031	27930	Aviron
27033	27930	Bacquepuis
27034	27440	Bacqueville
27035	27260	Bailleul-la-Vallée
27036	27130	Bâlines
27037	27170	Barc
27038	27130	Les Barils
27039	27310	Barneville-sur-Seine
27277	27220	La Baronnie
27040	27170	Barquet
27042	27230	Barville
27043	27160	Les Baux-de-Breteuil
27044	27180	Les Baux-Sainte-Croix
27045	27140	Bazincourt-sur-Epte
27046	27230	Bazoques
27047	27190	Beaubray
27048	27480	Beauficel-en-Lyons
27050	27170	Beaumontel
27051	27170	Beaumont-le-Roger
27052	27800	Le Bec-Hellouin
27053	27370	Le Bec-Thomas
27054	27160	Bémécourt
27055	27110	Bérengeville-la-Campagne
27056	27300	Bernay
27057	27180	Bernienville
27059	27660	Bernouville
27061	27800	Berthouville
27063	27170	Berville-la-Campagne
27064	27210	Berville-sur-Mer
27065	27210	Beuzeville
27066	27480	Bézu-la-Forêt
27067	27660	Bézu-Saint-Éloi
27068	27330	Bois-Anzeray
27069	27250	Bois-Arnault
27071	27260	Le Bois-Hellain
27072	27620	Bois-Jérôme-Saint-Ouen
27073	27220	Bois-le-Roi
27074	27800	Boisney
27075	27330	Bois-Normand-près-Lyre
27076	27120	Boisset-les-Prévanches
27077	27520	Boissey-le-Châtel
27078	27220	La Boissière
27079	27300	Boissy-Lamberville
27081	27120	Boncourt
27083	27290	Bonneville-Aptot
27082	27190	La Bonneville-sur-Iton
27302	27370	Le Bosc-du-Theil
27091	27310	Bosgouet
27094	27480	Bosquentin
27095	27800	Bosrobert
27090	27670	Bosroumois
27096	27250	Les Bottereaux
27097	27700	Bouafles
27098	27150	Bouchevilliers
27099	27930	Le Boulay-Morin
27100	27210	Boulleville
27101	27500	Bouquelon
27102	27310	Bouquetot
27103	27310	Bourg-Achard
27104	27380	Bourg-Beaudouin
27106	27230	Bournainville-Faverolles
27107	27500	Bourneville-Sainte-Croix
27108	27580	Bourth
27109	27170	Bray
27110	27350	Brestot
27111	27220	Bretagnolles
27112	27160	Breteuil
27113	27800	Brétigny
27114	27640	Breuilpont
27115	27570	Breux-sur-Avre
27116	27800	Brionne
27117	27270	Broglie
27118	27930	Brosville
27119	27730	Bueil
27120	27190	Burey
27123	27120	Caillouet-Orgeville
27124	27490	Cailly-sur-Eure
27125	27800	Calleville
27126	27500	Campigny
27127	27400	Canappeville
27129	27300	Caorches-Saint-Nicolas
27130	27270	Capelle-les-Grands
27132	27180	Caugé
27133	27310	Caumont
27134	27350	Cauverville-en-Roumois
27135	27110	Cesseville
27136	27120	Chaignes
27137	27580	Chaise-Dieu-du-Theil
27138	27270	Chamblac
27032	27240	Chambois
27139	27250	Chambord
27140	27120	Chambray
27141	27190	Champ-Dolent
27142	27600	Champenard
27144	27220	Champigny-la-Futelaye
27146	27260	La Chapelle-Bayvel
27147	27930	La Chapelle-du-Bois-des-Faulx
27148	27270	La Chapelle-Gauthier
27149	27230	La Chapelle-Hareng
27554	27950	La Chapelle-Longueville
27151	27380	Charleval
27152	27420	Château-sur-Epte
27153	27150	Chauvincourt-Provemont
27154	27220	Chavigny-Bailleul
27155	27820	Chennebrun
27156	27250	Chéronvilliers
27158	27930	Cierrey
27161	27180	Claville
27191	27490	Clef-Vallée-d'Eure
27162	27190	Collandres-Quincarnon
27163	27500	Colletot
27164	27170	Combon
27165	27190	Conches-en-Ouche
27167	27290	Condé-sur-Risle
27168	27430	Connelles
27169	27210	Conteville
27170	27260	Cormeilles
27171	27120	Le Cormier
27173	27300	Corneville-la-Fouquetière
27174	27500	Corneville-sur-Risle
27176	27150	Coudray
27177	27220	Coudres
27179	27300	Courbépine
27180	27940	Courcelles-sur-Seine
27181	27320	Courdemanche
27182	27130	Courteilles
27183	27750	La Couture-Boussey
27184	27400	Crasville
27185	27110	Crestot
27187	27110	Criquebeuf-la-Campagne
27188	27340	Criquebeuf-sur-Seine
27189	27190	La Croisille
27190	27120	Croisy-sur-Eure
27192	27110	Crosville-la-Vieille
27193	27530	Croth
27194	27700	Cuverville
27196	27340	Les Damps
27199	27720	Dangu
27200	27930	Dardez
27201	27110	Daubeuf-la-Campagne
27202	27430	Daubeuf-près-Vatteville
27203	27120	Douains
27204	27150	Doudeauville-en-Vexin
27205	27380	Douville-sur-Andelle
27206	27320	Droisy
27207	27230	Drucourt
27208	27230	Duranville
27209	27290	Écaquelon
27210	27170	Écardenville-la-Campagne
27212	27110	Écauville
27214	27440	Écouis
27215	27110	Ecquetot
27216	27930	Émalleville
27217	27190	Émanville
27218	27260	Épaignes
27219	27110	Épégard
27220	27730	Épieds
27222	27560	Épreville-en-Lieuvin
27224	27110	Épreville-près-le-Neubourg
27226	27150	Étrépagny
27227	27350	Étréville
27228	27350	Éturqueraye
27229	27000	Évreux
27230	27530	Ézy-sur-Eure
27231	27120	Fains
27232	27150	Farceaux
27233	27210	Fatouville-Grestain
27234	27930	Fauville
27235	27190	Faverolles-la-Campagne
27237	27230	Le Favril
27238	27190	Ferrières-Haut-Clocher
27239	27270	Ferrières-Saint-Hilaire
27240	27760	La Ferrière-sur-Risle
27241	27110	Feuguerolles
27242	27190	Le Fidelaire
27243	27210	Fiquefleur-Équainville
27085	27310	Flancourt-Crescy-en-Roumois
27245	27480	Fleury-la-Forêt
27246	27380	Fleury-sur-Andelle
27247	27380	Flipou
27248	27230	Folleville
27249	27600	Fontaine-Bellenger
27251	27300	Fontaine-l'Abbé
27252	27230	Fontaine-la-Louvet
27254	27120	Fontaine-sous-Jouy
27256	27220	La Forêt-du-Parc
27258	27210	Fort-Moville
27259	27220	Foucrainville
27260	27210	Foulbec
27261	27370	Fouqueville
27266	27800	Franqueville
27070	27150	Frenelles-en-Vexin
27267	27290	Freneuse-sur-Risle
27269	27260	Fresne-Cauverville
27271	27220	Fresney
27273	27120	Gadencourt
27275	27600	Gaillon
27276	27150	Gamaches-en-Vexin
27278	27780	Garennes-sur-Eure
27279	27620	Gasny
27280	27930	Gauciel
27281	27190	Gaudreville-la-Rivière
27282	27930	Gauville-la-Campagne
27284	27140	Gisors
27285	27620	Giverny
27286	27560	Giverville
27287	27190	Glisolles
27288	27290	Glos-sur-Risle
27289	27390	La Goulafrière
27290	27170	Goupil-Othon
27291	27580	Gournay-le-Guérin
27105	27520	Grand-Bourgtheroulde
27295	27270	Grand-Camp
27298	27110	Graveron-Sémerville
27299	27930	Gravigny
27300	27170	Grosley-sur-Risle
27301	27220	Grossœuvre
27304	27720	Guerny
27306	27930	Guichainville
27307	27700	Guiseniers
27309	27220	L'Habit
27310	27150	Hacqueville
27311	27800	Harcourt
27312	27120	Hardencourt-Cocherel
27313	27370	La Harengère
27315	27700	Harquency
27316	27350	Hauville
27317	27350	La Haye-Aubrée
27318	27800	La Haye-de-Calleville
27319	27350	La Haye-de-Routot
27320	27370	La Haye-du-Theil
27321	27400	La Haye-le-Comte
27322	27400	La Haye-Malherbe
27323	27330	La Haye-Saint-Sylvestre
27324	27150	Hébécourt
27325	27800	Hecmanville
27326	27120	Hécourt
27327	27110	Hectomare
27329	27700	Hennezis
27330	27430	Herqueville
27331	27630	Heubécourt-Haricourt
27332	27400	Heudebouville
27333	27860	Heudicourt
27334	27230	Heudreville-en-Lieuvin
27335	27400	Heudreville-sur-Eure
27336	27950	La Heunière
27337	27700	Heuqueville
27338	27910	Les Hogues
27339	27400	Hondouville
27340	27310	Honguemare-Guenouville
27341	27570	L'Hosmes
27342	27400	Houetteville
27343	27120	Houlbec-Cocherel
27345	27410	La Houssaye
27346	27440	Houville-en-Vexin
27347	27930	Huest
27348	27460	Igoville
27349	27290	Illeville-sur-Montfort

INSEE	Postal	Commune
27350	27770	Illiers-l'Évêque
27351	27400	Incarville
27353	27930	Irreville
27354	27110	Iville
27355	27540	Ivry-la-Bataille
27358	27120	Jouy-sur-Eure
27359	27250	Juignettes
27360	27220	Jumelles
27361	27210	La Lande-Saint-Léger
27363	27350	Le Landin
27364	27470	Launay
27365	27690	Léry
27565	27160	Le Lesme
27366	27910	Letteguives
27367	27560	Lieurey
27368	27220	Lignerolles
27369	27480	Lilly
27370	27440	Lisors
27371	27800	Livet-sur-Authou
27372	27150	Longchamps
27373	27480	Lorleau
27374	27190	Louversey
27375	27400	Louviers
27376	27650	Louye
27377	27480	Lyons-la-Forêt
27378	27320	La Madeleine-de-Nonancourt
27379	27150	Mainneville
27380	27800	Malleville-sur-le-Bec
27381	27300	Malouy
27382	27370	Mandeville
27383	27130	Mandres
27384	27210	Manneville-la-Raoult
27385	27500	Manneville-sur-Risle
27386	27460	Le Manoir
27388	27680	Marais-Vernier
27389	27110	Marbeuf
27157	27160	Marbois
27390	27320	Marcilly-la-Campagne
27391	27810	Marcilly-sur-Eure
27392	27150	Martagny
27393	27210	Martainville
27394	27340	Martot
27395	27390	Mélicourt
27396	27850	Ménesqueville
27397	27120	Ménilles
27398	27300	Menneval
27399	27950	Mercey
27400	27640	Merey
27049	27410	Mesnil-en-Ouche
27401	27930	Le Mesnil-Fuguet
27403	27400	Le Mesnil-Jourdain
27404	27390	Mesnil-Rousset
27541	27560	Le Mesnil-Saint-Jean
27405	27150	Mesnil-sous-Vienne
27198	27240	Mesnils-sur-Iton
27406	27650	Mesnil-sur-l'Estrée
27407	27440	Mesnil-Verclives
27408	27510	Mézières-en-Vexin
27410	27930	Miserey
27411	27320	Moisville
27413	27290	Montfort-sur-Risle
27414	27390	Montreuil-l'Argillé
27062	27520	Les Monts du Roumois
27415	27260	Morainville-Jouveaux
27417	27150	Morgny
27418	27800	Morsan
27419	27220	Mouettes
27420	27420	Mouflaines
27421	27220	Mousseaux-Neuville
27422	27430	Muids
27423	27650	Muzy
27424	27190	Nagel-Séez-Mesnil
27425	27550	Nassandres sur Risle
27427	27250	Neaufles-Auvergny
27426	27830	Neaufles-Saint-Martin
27428	27110	Le Neubourg
27429	27730	Neuilly
27430	27150	La Neuve-Grange
27431	27330	La Neuve-Lyre
27432	27890	La Neuville-du-Bosc
27433	27800	Neuville-sur-Authou
27434	27560	Noards
27435	27560	La Noë-Poulain
27436	27190	Nogent-le-Sec
27437	27150	Nojeon-en-Vexin
27438	27320	Nonancourt
27439	27930	Normanville
27440	27940	Notre-Dame-de-l'Isle
27441	27800	Notre-Dame-d'Épine
27442	27390	Notre-Dame-du-Hamel
27444	27410	Le Noyer-en-Ouche
27445	27720	Noyers
27446	27190	Ormes
27448	27120	Pacy-sur-Eure
27451	27180	Parville
27263	27500	Le Perrey
27453	27910	Perriers-sur-Andelle
27454	27910	Perruel
27455	27230	Piencourt
27456	27400	Pinterville
27457	27130	Piseux
27458	27590	Pîtres
27459	27230	Les Places
27460	27300	Plainville
27462	27230	Le Planquay
27463	27300	Plasnes
27464	27180	Le Plessis-Grohan
27465	27120	Le Plessis-Hébert
27466	27170	Le Plessis-Sainte-Opportune
27467	27500	Pont-Audemer
27468	27290	Pont-Authou
27469	27340	Pont-de-l'Arche
27470	27360	Pont-Saint-Pierre
27471	27430	Porte-de-Seine
27472	27190	Portes
27473	27940	Port-Mort
27474	27740	Poses
27475	27560	La Poterie-Mathieu
27476	27500	Les Préaux
27477	27510	Pressagny-l'Orgueilleux
27478	27220	Prey
27480	27150	Puchay
27481	27130	Pullay
27482	27370	La Pyle
27483	27400	Quatremare
27485	27680	Quillebeuf-sur-Seine
27486	27110	Quittebeuf
27487	27380	Radepont
27488	27910	Renneville
27489	27930	Reuilly
27490	27420	Richeville
27492	27170	Romilly-la-Puthenaye
27493	27610	Romilly-sur-Andelle
27495	27700	La Roquette
27496	27790	Rosay-sur-Lieure
27497	27350	Rougemontiers
27498	27110	Rouge-Perriers
27500	27350	Routot
27501	27120	Rouvray
27502	27250	Rugles
27504	27930	Sacquenville
27505	27390	Saint-Agnan-de-Cernières
27507	27220	Saint-André-de-l'Eure
27508	27250	Saint-Antonin-de-Sommaire
27511	27110	Saint-Aubin-d'Écrosville
27512	27230	Saint-Aubin-de-Scellon
27514	27270	Saint-Aubin-du-Thenney
27517	27600	Saint-Aubin-sur-Gaillon
27518	27680	Saint-Aubin-sur-Quillebeuf
27520	27450	Saint-Benoît-des-Ombres
27521	27820	Saint-Christophe-sur-Avre
27522	27450	Saint-Christophe-sur-Condé
27527	27800	Saint-Cyr-de-Salerne
27529	27370	Saint-Cyr-la-Campagne
27530	27390	Saint-Denis-d'Augerons
27531	27520	Saint-Denis-des-Monts
27533	27140	Saint-Denis-le-Ferment
27534	27370	Saint-Didier-des-Bois
27524	27110	Sainte-Colombe-la-Commanderie
27525	27950	Sainte-Colombe-près-Vernon
27540	27620	Sainte-Geneviève-lès-Gasny
27535	27190	Saint-Élier
27536	27800	Saint-Éloi-de-Fourques
27578	27160	Sainte-Marie-d'Attez
27567	27150	Sainte-Marie-de-Vatimesnil
27568	27190	Sainte-Marthe
27576	27110	Sainte-Opportune-du-Bosc
27577	27680	Sainte-Opportune-la-Mare
27537	27430	Saint-Étienne-du-Vauvray
27538	27450	Saint-Étienne-l'Allier
27539	27920	Saint-Étienne-sous-Bailleul
27542	27450	Saint-Georges-du-Vièvre
27543	27710	Saint-Georges-Motel
27544	27220	Saint-Germain-de-Fresney
27545	27370	Saint-Germain-de-Pasquier
27546	27930	Saint-Germain-des-Angles
27547	27230	Saint-Germain-la-Campagne
27548	27320	Saint-Germain-sur-Avre
27550	27450	Saint-Grégoire-du-Vièvre
27552	27270	Saint-Jean-du-Thenney
27553	27600	Saint-Julien-de-la-Liègue
27555	27220	Saint-Laurent-des-Bois
27556	27390	Saint-Laurent-du-Tencement
27557	27300	Saint-Léger-de-Rôtes
27558	27520	Saint-Léger-du-Gennetey
27560	27930	Saint-Luc
27561	27210	Saint-Maclou
27562	27950	Saint-Marcel
27563	27500	Saint-Mards-de-Blacarville
27564	27230	Saint-Mards-de-Fresne
27569	27300	Saint-Martin-du-Tilleul
27570	27930	Saint-Martin-la-Campagne
27571	27450	Saint-Martin-Saint-Firmin
27572	27370	Saint-Meslin-du-Bosc
27579	27370	Saint-Ouen-de-Pontcheuil
27580	27310	Saint-Ouen-de-Thouberville
27582	27670	Saint-Ouen-du-Tilleul
27584	27800	Saint-Paul-de-Fourques
27586	27520	Saint-Philbert-sur-Boissey
27587	27290	Saint-Philbert-sur-Risle
27589	27920	Saint-Pierre-de-Bailleul
27590	27390	Saint-Pierre-de-Cernières
27591	27260	Saint-Pierre-de-Cormeilles
27592	27800	Saint-Pierre-de-Salerne
27593	27370	Saint-Pierre-des-Fleurs
27594	27450	Saint-Pierre-des-Ifs
27595	27370	Saint-Pierre-du-Bosguérard
27597	27210	Saint-Pierre-du-Val
27598	27430	Saint-Pierre-du-Vauvray
27599	27600	Saint-Pierre-la-Garenne
27601	27680	Saint-Samson-de-la-Roque
27602	27180	Saint-Sébastien-de-Morsent
27603	27560	Saint-Siméon
27604	27210	Saint-Sulpice-de-Grimbouville
27605	27260	Saint-Sylvestre-de-Cormeilles
27606	27500	Saint-Symphorien
27608	27300	Saint-Victor-de-Chrétienville
27609	27800	Saint-Victor-d'Épine
27610	27130	Saint-Victor-sur-Avre
27611	27930	Saint-Vigor
27612	27950	Saint-Vincent-des-Bois
27613	27230	Saint-Vincent-du-Boulay
27614	27150	Sancourt
27615	27930	Sassey
27616	27370	La Saussaye
27617	27150	Saussay-la-Campagne
27618	27190	Sébécourt
27620	27500	Selles
27621	27220	Serez
27622	27470	Serquigny
27623	27400	Surtauville
27624	27400	Surville
27625	27420	Suzay
27693	27240	Sylvains-Lès-Moulins
27412	27400	Terres de Bord
27627	27230	Le Theil-Nolent
27089	27520	Thénouville
27629	27230	Thiberville
27630	27800	Thibouville
27631	27290	Thierville
27632	27150	Le Thil
27633	27420	Les Thilliers-en-Vexin
27635	27700	Le Thuit
27638	27370	Le Thuit-de-l'Oison
27640	27170	Tilleul-Dame-Agnès
27641	27110	Le Tilleul-Lambert
27643	27570	Tillières-sur-Avre
27644	27510	Tilly
27645	27500	Tocqueville
27646	27210	Le Torpt
27649	27440	Touffreville
27650	27180	Tournedos-Bois-Hubert
27652	27930	Tourneville
27654	27370	Tourville-la-Campagne
27655	27500	Tourville-sur-Pont-Audemer
27656	27500	Toutainville
27516	27300	Treis-Sants-en-Ouche
27658	27110	Le Tremblay-Omonville
27659	27930	La Trinité
27660	27270	La Trinité-de-Réville
27661	27310	La Trinité-de-Thouberville
27662	27500	Triqueville
27676	27940	Les Trois Lacs
27663	27110	Le Troncq
27664	27480	Le Tronquay
27665	27680	Trouville-la-Haule
27666	27400	La Vacherie
27667	27300	Valailles
27668	27120	Le Val-David
27701	27100	Val-de-Reuil
27022	27940	Le Val-d'Hazey
27447	27190	Le Val-Doré
27294	27380	Val d'Orger
27669	27350	Valletot
27670	27380	Vandrimare
27671	27210	Vannecrocq
27672	27910	Vascœuil
27673	27430	Vatteville
27528	27100	Le Vaudreuil
27674	27120	Vaux-sur-Eure
27677	27110	Venon
27678	27180	Les Ventes
27679	27130	Verneuil d'Avre et d'Iton
27680	27390	Verneusses
27681	27200	Vernon
27682	27870	Vesly
27213	27630	Vexin-sur-Epte
27683	27700	Vézillon
27684	27930	Le Vieil-Évreux
27685	27330	La Vieille-Lyre
27686	27680	Vieux-Port
27689	27120	Villegats
27690	27420	Villers-en-Vexin
27691	27940	Villers-sur-le-Roule
27692	27110	Villettes
27694	27950	Villez-sous-Bailleul
27695	27110	Villez-sur-le-Neubourg
27696	27640	Villiers-en-Désœuvre
27697	27400	Vironvay
27698	27110	Vitot
27699	27520	Voiscreville
27700	27370	Vraiville
