= Chamblac =

- Commune
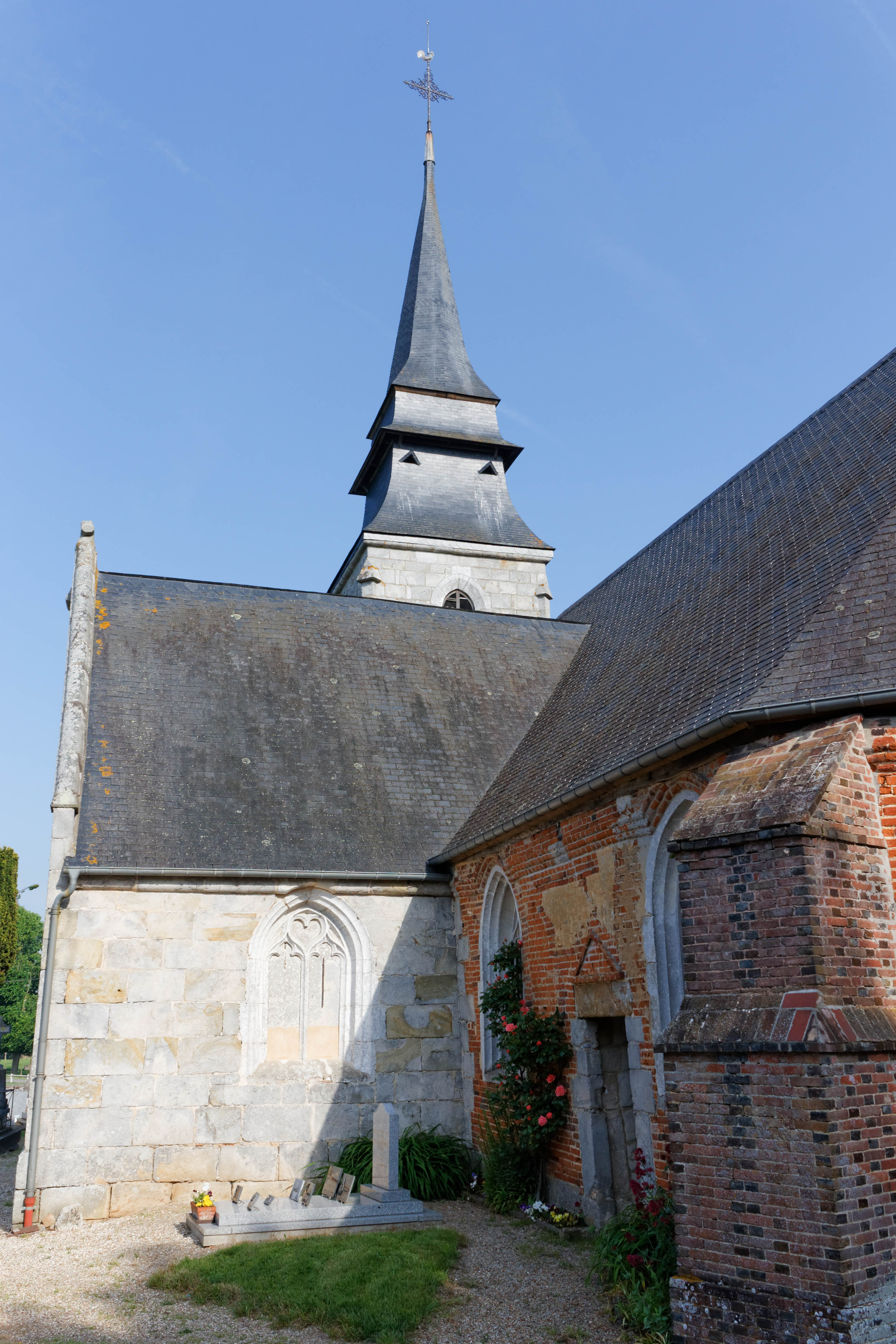
- The church in Chamblac

- Coat of arms
- Location of Chamblac
- Location within France Location within Normandy
- Coordinates: 48°59′21″N 0°32′43″E
- Country: France
- Region: Normandy
- Department: Eure
- Arrondissement: Bernay
- Canton: Breteuil

Government
  - Mayor (2020–2026): Charles-Edouard de Broglie
- Area^{1}: 20.9 km^{2} (8.1 sq mi)
- Highest elevation: 204 m (669 ft)
- Lowest elevation: 133 m (436 ft)
- Population (2023): 353
  - Density: 16.9/km^{2} (43.7/sq mi)
- Time zone: UTC+01:00 (CET)
  - Summer (DST): UTC+02:00 (CEST)
- INSEE/Postal code: 27138 /27270
- ^{1} French Land Register data, which excludes lakes, ponds, glaciers > 1 km^{2} (0.386 sq mi or 247 acres) and river estuaries.

Chamblac (French pronunciation: [ʃɑ̃blak]) is a commune in the Eure department in northern France.

== Geography ==
The commune along with another 69 communes shares part of a 4,747 hectare, Natura 2000 conservation area, called Risle, Guiel, Charentonne.

== Population ==
Historical population
Year	Pop.	±% p.a.
1968	342	—
1975	351	+0.37%
1982	327	−1.01%
1990	336	+0.34%
1999	376	+1.26%
2007	363	−0.44%
2012	392	+1.55%
2017	391	−0.05%
2023	353	−1.69%
Source: INSEE

== See also ==
- Communes of the Eure department
