= Saint-Jean-du-Thenney =

- Commune
- Location of Saint-Jean-du-Thenney
- Location within France Location within Normandy
- Coordinates: 49°00′55″N 0°27′57″E
- Country: France
- Region: Normandy
- Department: Eure
- Arrondissement: Bernay
- Canton: Breteuil

Government
  - Mayor (2022–2026): Pascal Cognin
- Area^{1}: 8.31 km^{2} (3.21 sq mi)
- Elevation: 198 m (650 ft)
- Highest elevation: 198 m (650 ft)
- Lowest elevation: 157 m (515 ft)
- Population (2023): 210
  - Density: 25/km^{2} (65/sq mi)
- Time zone: UTC+01:00 (CET)
  - Summer (DST): UTC+02:00 (CEST)
- INSEE/Postal code: 27552 /27270
- ^{1} French Land Register data, which excludes lakes, ponds, glaciers > 1 km^{2} (0.386 sq mi or 247 acres) and river estuaries.

Saint-Jean-du-Thenney (French pronunciation: [sɛ̃ ʒɑ̃ dy tɛnɛ]) is a commune in the Eure department in Normandy in northern France.

== Population ==
Historical population
Year	Pop.	±% p.a.
1968	169	—
1975	177	+0.66%
1982	177	+0.00%
1990	192	+1.02%
1999	186	−0.35%
2007	202	+1.04%
2012	228	+2.45%
2017	245	+1.45%
2023	210	−2.54%
Source: INSEE

== See also ==
- Communes of the Eure department
