= Bois-Normand-près-Lyre =

- Commune
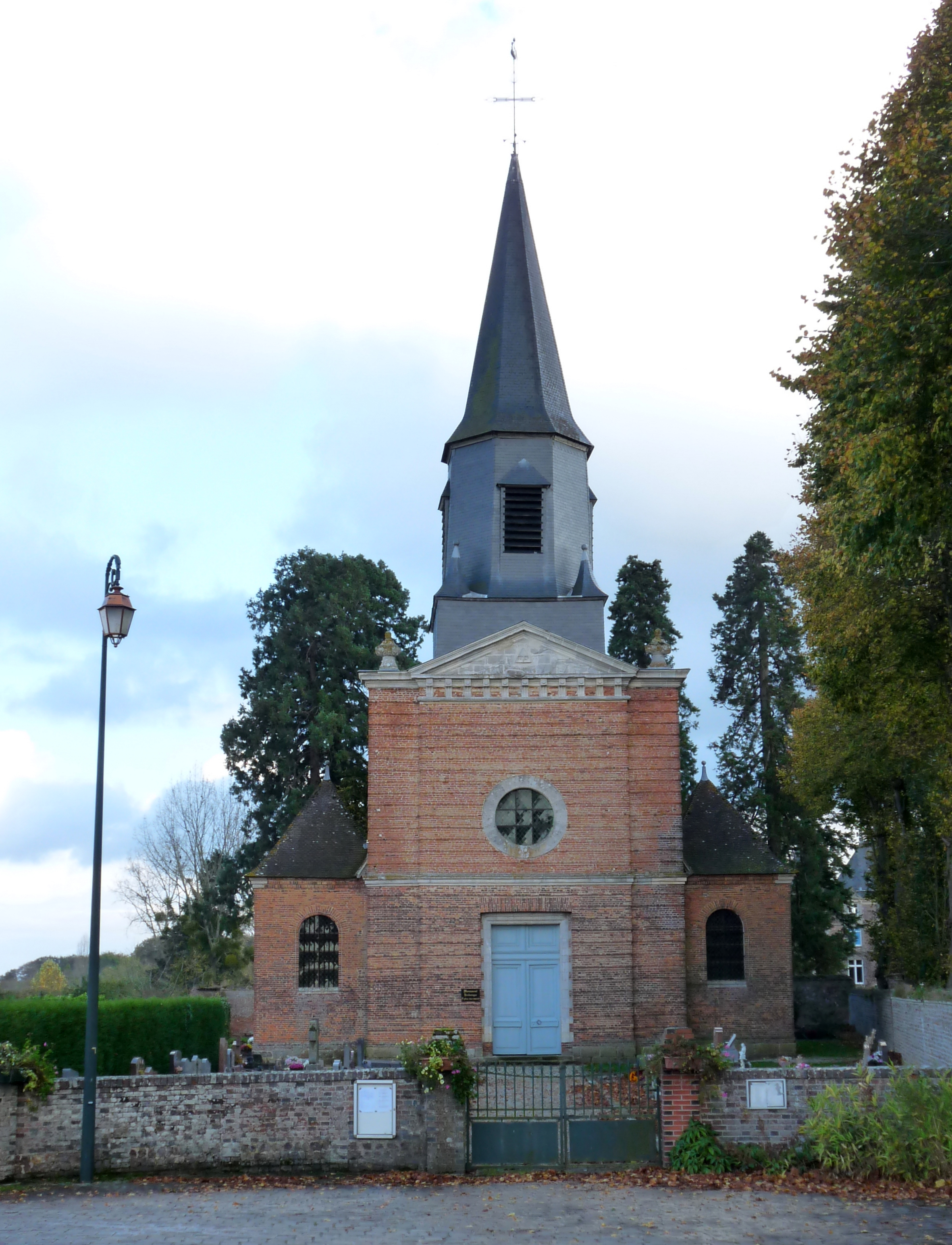
- The church in Bois-Normand-près-Lyre

- Coat of arms
- Location of Bois-Normand-près-Lyre
- Location within France Location within Normandy
- Coordinates: 48°53′52″N 0°41′48″E
- Country: France
- Region: Normandy
- Department: Eure
- Arrondissement: Bernay
- Canton: Breteuil

Government
  - Mayor (2020–2026): Emmanuel Bourlon de Rouvre
- Area^{1}: 16.88 km^{2} (6.52 sq mi)
- Elevation: 195 m (640 ft)
- Highest elevation: 215 m (705 ft)
- Lowest elevation: 165 m (541 ft)
- Population (2023): 369
  - Density: 21.9/km^{2} (56.6/sq mi)
- Time zone: UTC+01:00 (CET)
  - Summer (DST): UTC+02:00 (CEST)
- INSEE/Postal code: 27075 /27330
- ^{1} French Land Register data, which excludes lakes, ponds, glaciers > 1 km^{2} (0.386 sq mi or 247 acres) and river estuaries.

Bois-Normand-près-Lyre (French pronunciation: [bwa nɔʁmɑ̃ pʁɛ liʁ], lit. 'Bois-Normand near Lyre') is a commune in the Eure department in Normandy in northern France.

== Population ==
Historical population
Year	Pop.	±% p.a.
1968	317	—
1975	333	+0.71%
1982	308	−1.11%
1990	325	+0.67%
1999	308	−0.60%
2007	345	+1.43%
2012	380	+1.95%
2017	340	−2.20%
2023	369	+1.37%
Source: INSEE

== See also ==
- Communes of the Eure department
