= Saint-Antonin-de-Sommaire =

- Commune
- Location of Saint-Antonin-de-Sommaire
- Location within France Location within Normandy
- Coordinates: 48°49′58″N 0°40′08″E
- Country: France
- Region: Normandy
- Department: Eure
- Arrondissement: Bernay
- Canton: Breteuil

Government
  - Mayor (2020–2026): Jean-Luc Bodey
- Area^{1}: 7.16 km^{2} (2.76 sq mi)
- Elevation: 237 m (778 ft)
- Highest elevation: 245 m (804 ft)
- Lowest elevation: 190 m (620 ft)
- Population (2023): 216
  - Density: 30.2/km^{2} (78.1/sq mi)
- Time zone: UTC+01:00 (CET)
  - Summer (DST): UTC+02:00 (CEST)
- INSEE/Postal code: 27508 /27250
- ^{1} French Land Register data, which excludes lakes, ponds, glaciers > 1 km^{2} (0.386 sq mi or 247 acres) and river estuaries.

Saint-Antonin-de-Sommaire (French pronunciation: [sɛ̃.t‿ɑ̃tɔnɛ̃ də sɔmɛʁ]) is a commune in the Eure department in Normandy in northern France.

== Population ==
Historical population
Year	Pop.	±% p.a.
1968	186	—
1975	179	−0.55%
1982	182	+0.24%
1990	188	+0.41%
1999	170	−1.11%
2007	177	+0.51%
2012	170	−0.80%
2017	183	+1.48%
2023	216	+2.80%
Source: INSEE

== See also ==
- Communes of the Eure department
