= L'Hosmes =

- Commune
- Location of L'Hosmes
- Location within France Location within Normandy
- Coordinates: 48°47′16″N 1°02′05″E
- Country: France
- Region: Normandy
- Department: Eure
- Arrondissement: Bernay
- Canton: Verneuil d'Avre et d'Iton

Government
  - Mayor (2020–2026): Jean-Luc Boulogne
- Area^{1}: 6.74 km^{2} (2.60 sq mi)
- Elevation: 150 m (490 ft)
- Highest elevation: 179 m (587 ft)
- Lowest elevation: 159 m (522 ft)
- Population (2023): 65
  - Density: 9.6/km^{2} (25/sq mi)
- Time zone: UTC+01:00 (CET)
  - Summer (DST): UTC+02:00 (CEST)
- INSEE/Postal code: 27341 /27570
- ^{1} French Land Register data, which excludes lakes, ponds, glaciers > 1 km^{2} (0.386 sq mi or 247 acres) and river estuaries.

L'Hosmes (French pronunciation: [lom]) is a commune in the Eure department in northern France.

== Population ==
Historical population
Year	Pop.	±% p.a.
1968	66	—
1975	50	−3.89%
1982	88	+8.41%
1990	102	+1.86%
1999	80	−2.66%
2007	68	−2.01%
2012	86	+4.81%
2017	68	−4.59%
2023	65	−0.75%
Source: INSEE

== See also ==
- Communes of the Eure department
