= Juignettes =

- Commune
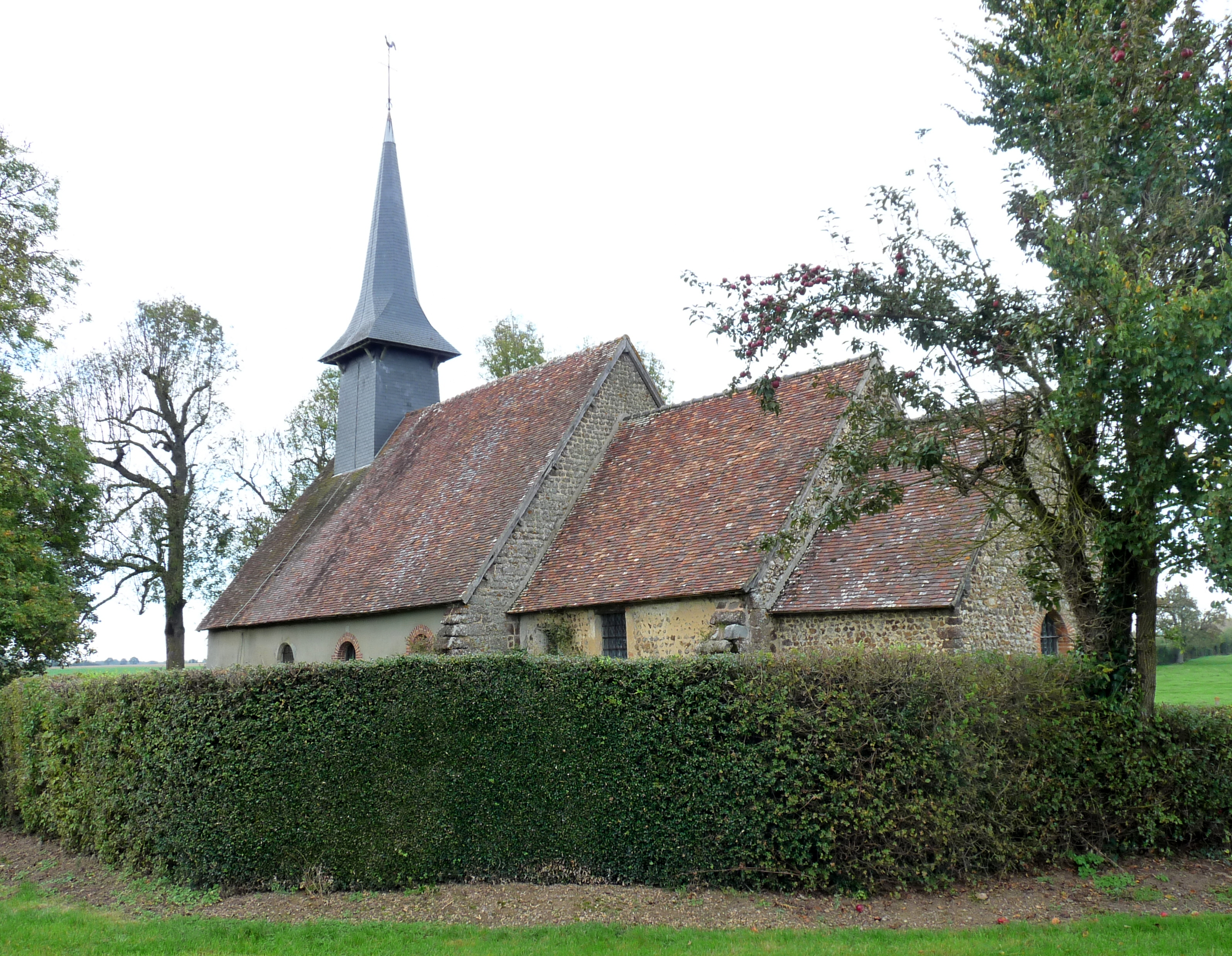
- The church of Saint-Pierre in Juignettes
- Location of Juignettes
- Location within France Location within Normandy
- Coordinates: 48°50′44″N 0°39′23″E
- Country: France
- Region: Normandy
- Department: Eure
- Arrondissement: Bernay
- Canton: Breteuil

Government
  - Mayor (2020–2026): Michel Gosset
- Area^{1}: 12.96 km^{2} (5.00 sq mi)
- Elevation: 237 m (778 ft)
- Highest elevation: 251 m (823 ft)
- Lowest elevation: 192 m (630 ft)
- Population (2023): 282
  - Density: 21.8/km^{2} (56.4/sq mi)
- Time zone: UTC+01:00 (CET)
  - Summer (DST): UTC+02:00 (CEST)
- INSEE/Postal code: 27359 /27250
- ^{1} French Land Register data, which excludes lakes, ponds, glaciers > 1 km^{2} (0.386 sq mi or 247 acres) and river estuaries.

Juignettes (French pronunciation: [ʒɥiɲɛt]) is a commune in the Eure department in Normandy in northern France.

== Population ==
Historical population
| Year | Pop. | ±% p.a. |
|---|---|---|
| 1968 | 150 | — |
| 1975 | 142 | −0.78% |
| 1982 | 141 | −0.10% |
| 1990 | 131 | −0.92% |
| 1999 | 136 | +0.42% |
| 2007 | 233 | +6.96% |
| 2012 | 243 | +0.84% |
| 2017 | 220 | −1.97% |
| 2023 | 282 | +4.22% |
Source: INSEE

== See also ==
- Communes of the Eure department
