= Chéronvilliers =

- Commune
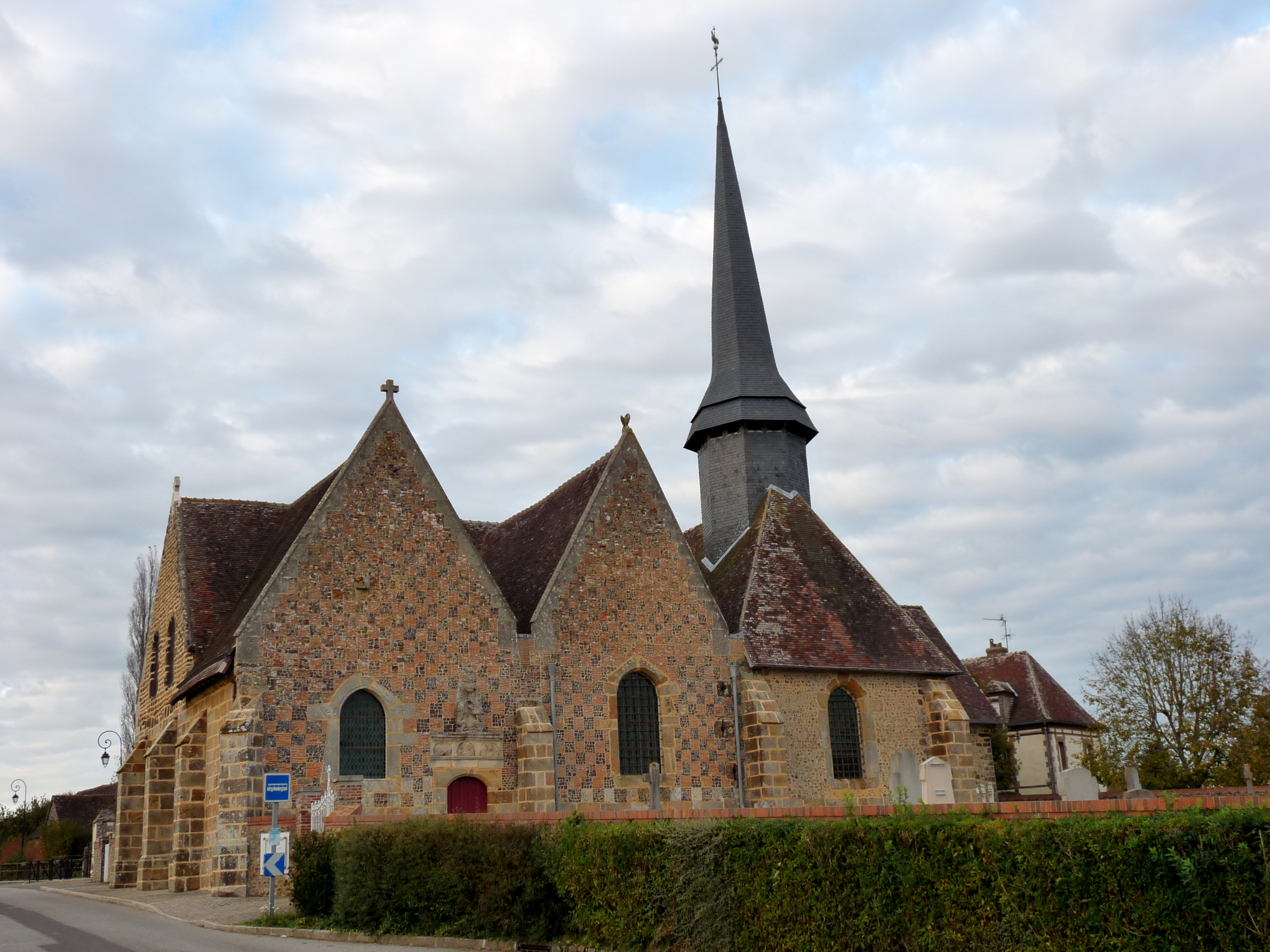
- The church in Chéronvilliers
- Location of Chéronvilliers
- Location within France Location within Normandy
- Coordinates: 48°47′24″N 0°44′29″E
- Country: France
- Region: Normandy
- Department: Eure
- Arrondissement: Bernay
- Canton: Breteuil

Government
  - Mayor (2020–2026): Patrice Boudeyron
- Area^{1}: 21.51 km^{2} (8.31 sq mi)
- Elevation: 215 m (705 ft)
- Highest elevation: 219 m (719 ft)
- Lowest elevation: 180 m (590 ft)
- Population (2023): 455
  - Density: 21.2/km^{2} (54.8/sq mi)
- Time zone: UTC+01:00 (CET)
  - Summer (DST): UTC+02:00 (CEST)
- INSEE/Postal code: 27156 /27250
- ^{1} French Land Register data, which excludes lakes, ponds, glaciers > 1 km^{2} (0.386 sq mi or 247 acres) and river estuaries.

Chéronvilliers (French pronunciation: [ʃeʁɔ̃vilje]) is a commune in the Eure department in the Normandy region in northern France.

== Population ==
Historical population
Year	Pop.	±% p.a.
1968	341	—
1975	327	−0.60%
1982	379	+2.13%
1990	377	−0.07%
1999	389	+0.35%
2007	462	+2.17%
2012	540	+3.17%
2017	505	−1.33%
2023	455	−1.72%
Source: INSEE

== See also ==
- Communes of the Eure department
