= Canton of Breteuil =

Canton in Normandy, France

Coordinates: 48.84°N 0.91°E

The canton of Breteuil is an administrative division of the Eure department, northern France. Its borders were modified at the French canton reorganisation which came into effect in March 2015. Its seat is in Breteuil.

It consists of the following communes:

1. Ambenay
2. Les Baux-de-Breteuil
3. Bémécourt
4. Bois-Anzeray
5. Bois-Arnault
6. Bois-Normand-près-Lyre
7. Les Bottereaux
8. Breteuil
9. Broglie
10. Capelle-les-Grands
11. Chaise-Dieu-du-Theil
12. Chamblac
13. Chambord
14. La Chapelle-Gauthier
15. Chéronvilliers
16. Ferrières-Saint-Hilaire
17. La Goulafrière
18. Grand-Camp
19. La Haye-Saint-Sylvestre
20. Juignettes
21. Le Lesme
22. Marbois
23. Mélicourt
24. Mesnil-Rousset
25. Mesnils-sur-Iton (partly)
26. Montreuil-l'Argillé
27. Neaufles-Auvergny
28. La Neuve-Lyre
29. Notre-Dame-du-Hamel
30. Rugles
31. Saint-Agnan-de-Cernières
32. Saint-Antonin-de-Sommaire
33. Saint-Aubin-du-Thenney
34. Saint-Denis-d'Augerons
35. Sainte-Marie-d'Attez
36. Saint-Jean-du-Thenney
37. Saint-Laurent-du-Tencement
38. Saint-Pierre-de-Cernières
39. La Trinité-de-Réville
40. Verneuil d'Avre et d'Iton (partly)
41. Verneusses
42. La Vieille-Lyre
