= Saint-Denis-d'Augerons =

- Commune
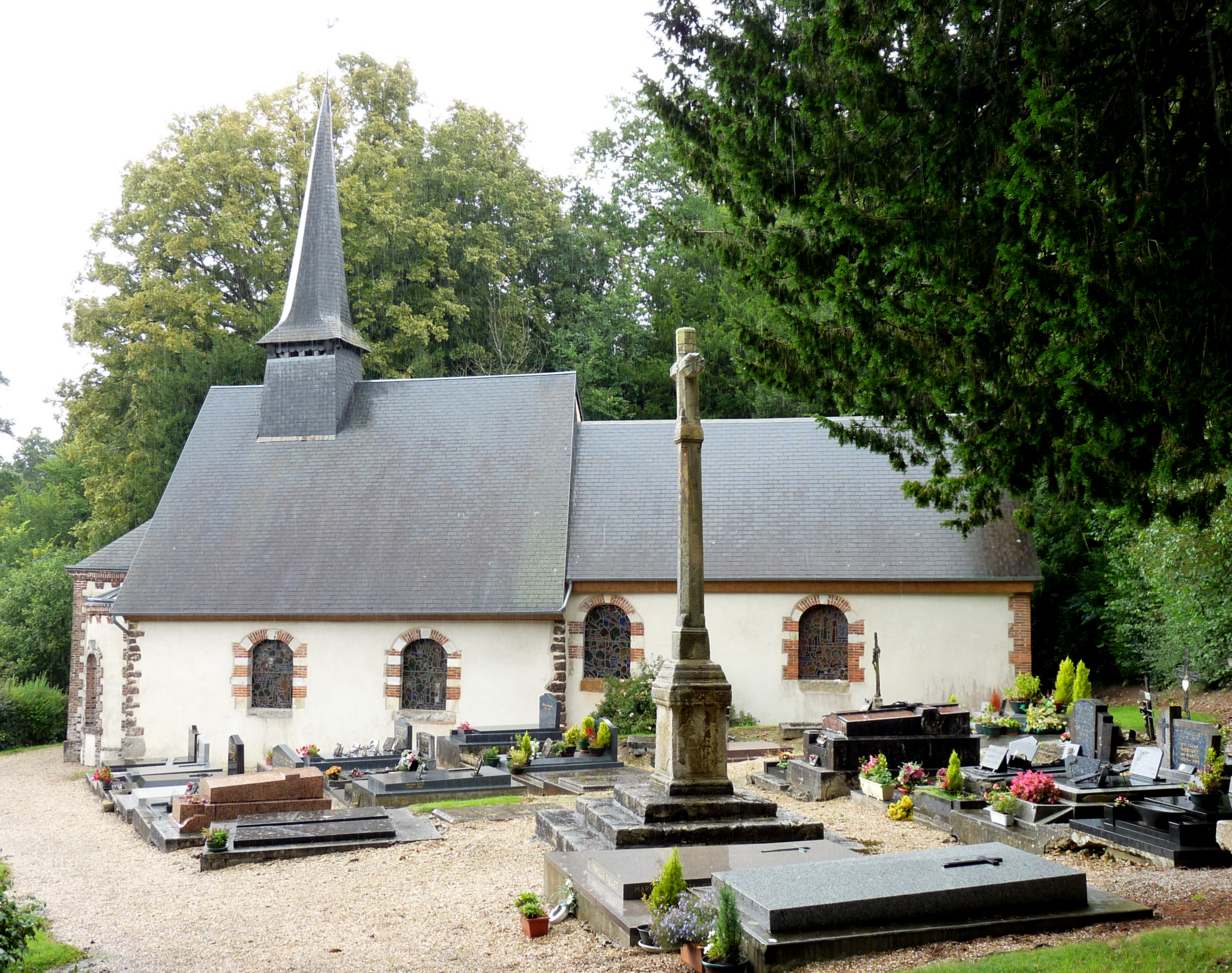
- The church in Saint-Denis-d'Augerons
- Location of Saint-Denis-d'Augerons
- Location within France Location within Normandy
- Coordinates: 48°55′35″N 0°28′29″E
- Country: France
- Region: Normandy
- Department: Eure
- Arrondissement: Bernay
- Canton: Breteuil

Government
  - Mayor (2020–2026): Colette Rodrigue
- Area^{1}: 4.27 km^{2} (1.65 sq mi)
- Elevation: 220 m (720 ft)
- Highest elevation: 226 m (741 ft)
- Lowest elevation: 173 m (568 ft)
- Population (2023): 75
  - Density: 18/km^{2} (45/sq mi)
- Time zone: UTC+01:00 (CET)
  - Summer (DST): UTC+02:00 (CEST)
- INSEE/Postal code: 27530 /27390
- ^{1} French Land Register data, which excludes lakes, ponds, glaciers > 1 km^{2} (0.386 sq mi or 247 acres) and river estuaries.

Saint-Denis-d'Augerons (French pronunciation: [sɛ̃ dəni doʒʁɔ̃]) is a commune in the Eure department in Normandy in northern France.

== Geography ==
The commune along with another 69 communes shares part of a 4,747 hectare, Natura 2000 conservation area, called Risle, Guiel, Charentonne.

== Population ==
Historical population
Year	Pop.	±% p.a.
1968	144	—
1975	117	−2.92%
1982	109	−1.01%
1990	92	−2.10%
1999	97	+0.59%
2007	85	−1.64%
2012	89	+0.92%
2017	85	−0.92%
2023	75	−2.06%
Source: INSEE

== See also ==
- Communes of the Eure department
