= Bois-Arnault =

- Commune
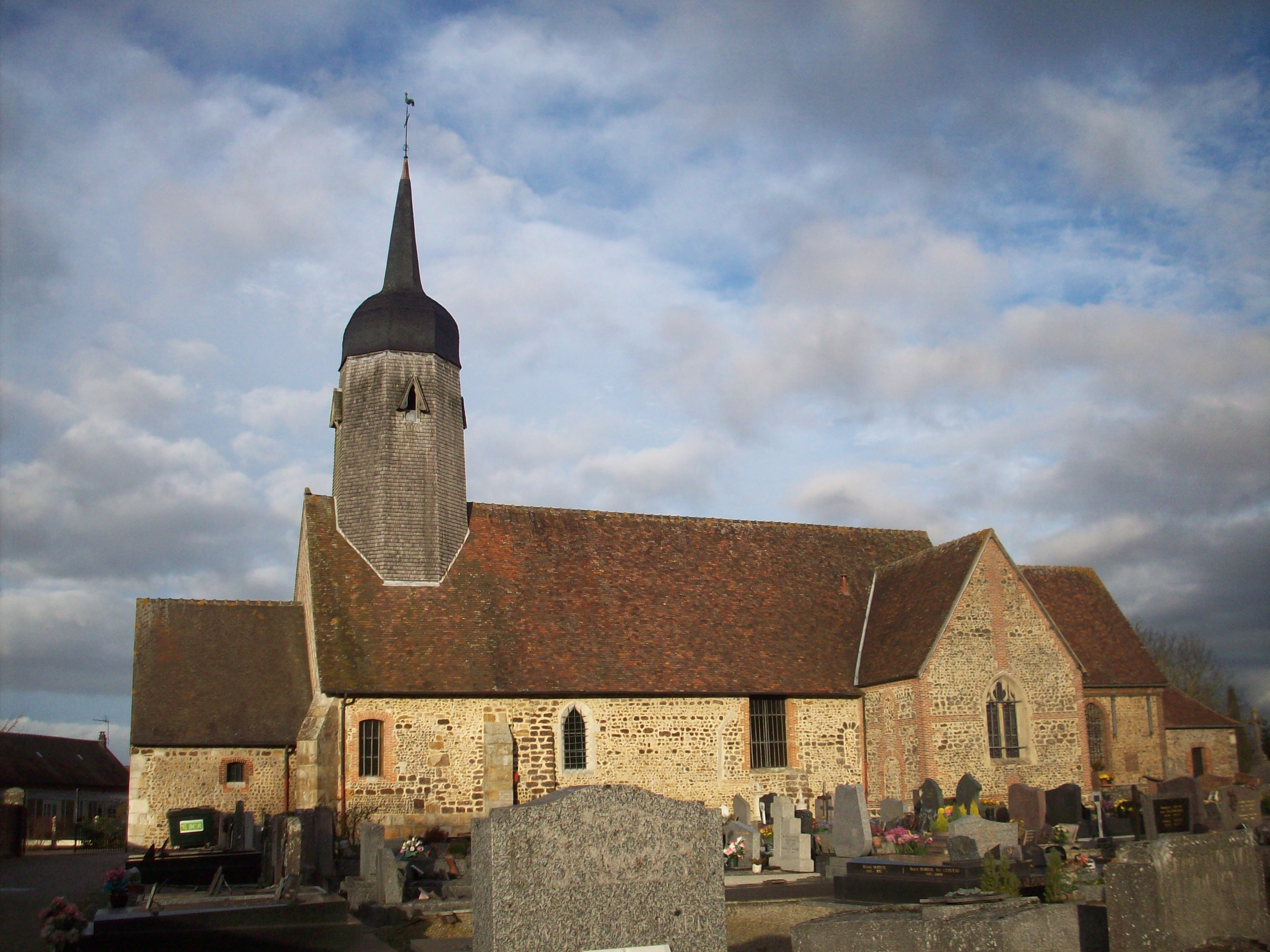
- The church in Bois-Arnault
- Location of Bois-Arnault
- Location within France Location within Normandy
- Coordinates: 48°48′58″N 0°43′52″E
- Country: France
- Region: Normandy
- Department: Eure
- Arrondissement: Bernay
- Canton: Breteuil

Government
  - Mayor (2020–2026): Françoise Compagnon
- Area^{1}: 12.9 km^{2} (5.0 sq mi)
- Elevation: 212 m (696 ft)
- Highest elevation: 218 m (715 ft)
- Lowest elevation: 180 m (590 ft)
- Population (2023): 704
  - Density: 54.6/km^{2} (141/sq mi)
- Time zone: UTC+01:00 (CET)
  - Summer (DST): UTC+02:00 (CEST)
- INSEE/Postal code: 27069 /27250
- ^{1} French Land Register data, which excludes lakes, ponds, glaciers > 1 km^{2} (0.386 sq mi or 247 acres) and river estuaries.

Bois-Arnault (French pronunciation: [bwa aʁno]) is a commune in the Eure department in Normandy in northern France.

== Population ==
Historical population
Year	Pop.	±% p.a.
1968	602	—
1975	615	+0.31%
1982	630	+0.34%
1990	652	+0.43%
1999	628	−0.42%
2007	725	+1.81%
2012	734	+0.25%
2017	700	−0.94%
2023	704	+0.10%
Source: INSEE

== See also ==
- Communes of the Eure department
