= Chambord, Eure =

Chambord
- Commune
- Coat of arms
- Location of Chambord
- Location within France Location within Normandy
- Coordinates: 48°53′26″N 0°36′36″E
- Country: France
- Region: Normandy
- Department: Eure
- Arrondissement: Bernay
- Canton: Breteuil
- Intercommunality: Normandie Sud Eure

Government
  - Mayor (2020–2026): Guido Vandewalle
- Area^{1}: 14.62 km^{2} (5.64 sq mi)
- Elevation: 240 m (790 ft)
- Highest elevation: 238 m (781 ft)
- Lowest elevation: 179 m (587 ft)
- Population (2023): 167
  - Density: 11.4/km^{2} (29.6/sq mi)
- Time zone: UTC+01:00 (CET)
  - Summer (DST): UTC+02:00 (CEST)
- INSEE/Postal code: 27139 /27250
- ^{1} French Land Register data, which excludes lakes, ponds, glaciers > 1 km^{2} (0.386 sq mi or 247 acres) and river estuaries.

Chambord (French pronunciation: [ʃɑ̃bɔʁ]) is a commune in the Eure department in northern France.

== Population ==
Historical population
Year	Pop.	±% p.a.
1968	281	—
1975	210	−4.08%
1982	172	−2.81%
1990	158	−1.06%
1999	194	+2.31%
2007	174	−1.35%
2012	158	−1.91%
2017	163	+0.63%
2023	167	+0.40%
Source: INSEE

== See also ==
- Communes of the Eure department
