= La Haye-Saint-Sylvestre =

- Commune
- Coat of arms
- Location of La Haye-Saint-Sylvestre
- Location within France Location within Normandy
- Coordinates: 48°54′35″N 0°36′31″E
- Country: France
- Region: Normandy
- Department: Eure
- Arrondissement: Bernay
- Canton: Breteuil

Government
  - Mayor (2020–2026): Hélène Biquet
- Area^{1}: 18.64 km^{2} (7.20 sq mi)
- Elevation: 209 m (686 ft)
- Highest elevation: 224 m (735 ft)
- Lowest elevation: 178 m (584 ft)
- Population (2023): 285
  - Density: 15.3/km^{2} (39.6/sq mi)
- Time zone: UTC+01:00 (CET)
  - Summer (DST): UTC+02:00 (CEST)
- INSEE/Postal code: 27323 /27330
- ^{1} French Land Register data, which excludes lakes, ponds, glaciers > 1 km^{2} (0.386 sq mi or 247 acres) and river estuaries.

La Haye-Saint-Sylvestre (French pronunciation: [la ɛ sɛ̃ silvɛstʁ]) is a commune in the Eure department in northern France.

== Population ==
Historical population
Year	Pop.	±% p.a.
1968	269	—
1975	281	+0.63%
1982	264	−0.89%
1990	243	−1.03%
1999	231	−0.56%
2007	217	−0.78%
2012	262	+3.84%
2017	279	+1.27%
2023	285	+0.36%
Source: INSEE

== See also ==
- Communes of the Eure department
