= Bérengeville-la-Campagne =

- Commune
- Coat of arms
- Location of Bérengeville-la-Campagne
- Location within France Location within Normandy
- Coordinates: 49°06′56″N 1°04′03″E
- Country: France
- Region: Normandy
- Department: Eure
- Arrondissement: Bernay
- Canton: Le Neubourg
- Intercommunality: Pays du Neubourg

Government
  - Mayor (2020–2026): Patrick Lhermeroult
- Area^{1}: 9.19 km^{2} (3.55 sq mi)
- Elevation: 140 m (460 ft)
- Highest elevation: 147 m (482 ft)
- Lowest elevation: 60 m (200 ft)
- Population (2023): 331
  - Density: 36.0/km^{2} (93.3/sq mi)
- Time zone: UTC+01:00 (CET)
  - Summer (DST): UTC+02:00 (CEST)
- INSEE/Postal code: 27055 /27110
- ^{1} French Land Register data, which excludes lakes, ponds, glaciers > 1 km^{2} (0.386 sq mi or 247 acres) and river estuaries.

Bérengeville-la-Campagne (French pronunciation: [beʁɑ̃ʒvil la kɑ̃paɲ]) is a commune in the Eure department and Normandy region in north-western France.

== Population ==
Historical population
Year	Pop.	±% p.a.
1968	195	—
1975	205	+0.72%
1982	257	+3.28%
1990	269	+0.57%
1999	258	−0.46%
2007	284	+1.21%
2012	302	+1.24%
2017	324	+1.42%
2023	331	+0.36%
Source: INSEE

== See also ==
- Communes of the Eure department
