= Feuguerolles =

- Commune
- Coat of arms
- Location of Feuguerolles
- Location within France Location within Normandy
- Coordinates: 49°07′51″N 1°02′39″E
- Country: France
- Region: Normandy
- Department: Eure
- Arrondissement: Bernay
- Canton: Le Neubourg

Government
  - Mayor (2020–2026): Jean-Paul Valignat
- Area^{1}: 8.2 km^{2} (3.2 sq mi)
- Elevation: 142 m (466 ft)
- Highest elevation: 146 m (479 ft)
- Lowest elevation: 63 m (207 ft)
- Population (2023): 167
  - Density: 20/km^{2} (53/sq mi)
- Time zone: UTC+01:00 (CET)
  - Summer (DST): UTC+02:00 (CEST)
- INSEE/Postal code: 27241 /27110
- ^{1} French Land Register data, which excludes lakes, ponds, glaciers > 1 km^{2} (0.386 sq mi or 247 acres) and river estuaries.

Feuguerolles (French pronunciation: [føɡ(ə)ʁɔl]) is a commune in the Eure department in the Normandy region in northern France.

== Population ==
Historical population
Year	Pop.	±% p.a.
1968	109	—
1975	106	−0.40%
1982	109	+0.40%
1990	146	+3.72%
1999	152	+0.45%
2007	182	+2.28%
2012	181	−0.11%
2017	177	−0.45%
2023	167	−0.96%
Source: INSEE

== See also ==
- Communes of the Eure department
