= La Trinité-de-Réville =

- Commune
- Location of La Trinité-de-Réville
- Location within France Location within Normandy
- Coordinates: 48°58′16″N 0°30′52″E
- Country: France
- Region: Normandy
- Department: Eure
- Arrondissement: Bernay
- Canton: Breteuil

Government
  - Mayor (2020–2026): Patrick Delanoue
- Area^{1}: 11.15 km^{2} (4.31 sq mi)
- Elevation: 154 m (505 ft)
- Highest elevation: 206 m (676 ft)
- Lowest elevation: 145 m (476 ft)
- Population (2023): 252
  - Density: 22.6/km^{2} (58.5/sq mi)
- Time zone: UTC+01:00 (CET)
  - Summer (DST): UTC+02:00 (CEST)
- INSEE/Postal code: 27660 /27270
- ^{1} French Land Register data, which excludes lakes, ponds, glaciers > 1 km^{2} (0.386 sq mi or 247 acres) and river estuaries.

La Trinité-de-Réville is a commune in the Eure department in Normandy in northern France.

== Geography ==
The commune along with another 69 communes shares part of a 4,747 hectare, Natura 2000 conservation area, called Risle, Guiel, Charentonne.

== Population ==
Historical population
Year	Pop.	±% p.a.
1968	256	—
1975	229	−1.58%
1982	233	+0.25%
1990	190	−2.52%
1999	188	−0.12%
2007	242	+3.21%
2012	252	+0.81%
2017	239	−1.05%
2023	252	+0.89%
Source: INSEE

== See also ==
- Communes of the Eure department
