= Chaise-Dieu-du-Theil =

- Commune
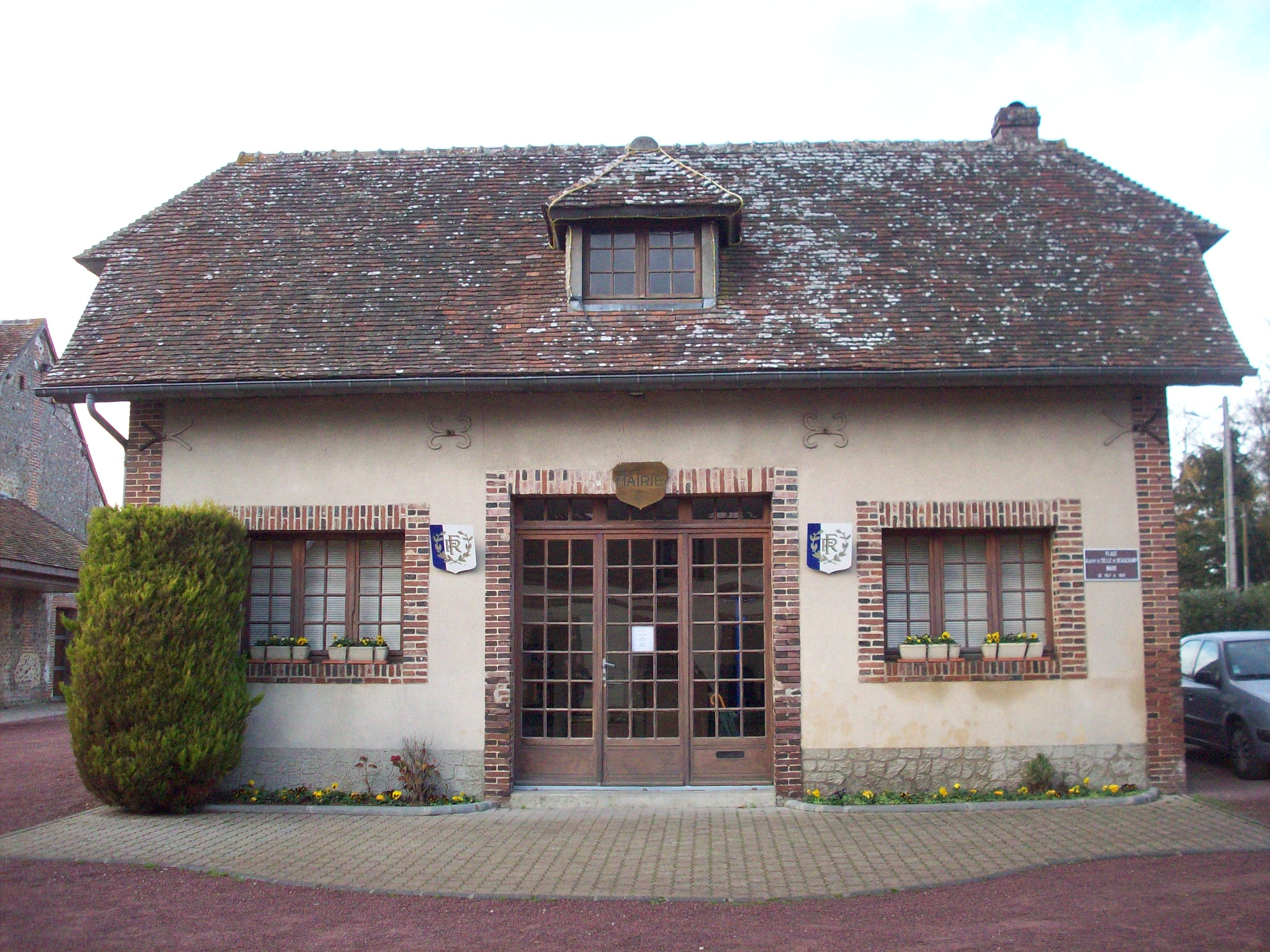
- The town hall in Chaise-Dieu-du-Theil
- Location of Chaise-Dieu-du-Theil
- Location within France Location within Normandy
- Coordinates: 48°46′08″N 0°45′43″E
- Country: France
- Region: Normandy
- Department: Eure
- Arrondissement: Bernay
- Canton: Breteuil

Government
  - Mayor (2020–2026): Charles de Selle de Beauchamp
- Area^{1}: 5.93 km^{2} (2.29 sq mi)
- Elevation: 211 m (692 ft)
- Highest elevation: 219 m (719 ft)
- Lowest elevation: 187 m (614 ft)
- Population (2023): 218
  - Density: 36.8/km^{2} (95.2/sq mi)
- Time zone: UTC+01:00 (CET)
  - Summer (DST): UTC+02:00 (CEST)
- INSEE/Postal code: 27137 /27580
- ^{1} French Land Register data, which excludes lakes, ponds, glaciers > 1 km^{2} (0.386 sq mi or 247 acres) and river estuaries.

Chaise-Dieu-du-Theil (French pronunciation: [ʃɛz djø dy tɛj]) is a commune in the Eure department in northern France.

== Population ==
Historical population
Year	Pop.	±% p.a.
1968	295	—
1975	273	−1.10%
1982	252	−1.14%
1990	241	−0.56%
1999	245	+0.18%
2007	233	−0.63%
2012	234	+0.09%
2017	216	−1.59%
2023	218	+0.15%
Source: INSEE

== See also ==
- Communes of the Eure department
