= Risle, Guiel, Charentonne =

Risle, Guiel, Charentonne is a Natura 2000 site around the rivers and valleys of the Risle, Charentonne, Guiel and their tributaries and valleys of these rivers.

== Geography ==
The area is 4,747 hectares in size and is mostly within the Eure department of Normandy, with the remaining 7% of the area based in the Orne department. The valleys of the protected area which the rivers run through are an Alluvial plain.

It is spread across 70 different communes all within the Orne department;

1. Aclou
2. Ambenay
3. Appeville-Annebault
4. Authou
5. Barquet
6. Beaumont-le-Roger
7. Beaumontel
8. Le Bec-Hellouin
9. Bernay
10. Bosrobert
11. Brionne
12. Broglie
13. Calleville
14. Campigny
15. Caorches-Saint-Nicolas
16. Chamblac
17. Chaumont
18. Condé-sur-Risle
19. Corneville-sur-Risle
20. La Ferrière-sur-Risle
21. Ferrières-Saint-Hilaire
22. La Ferté-en-Ouche
23. Fontaine-l'Abbé
24. Freneuse-sur-Risle
25. Glos-sur-Risle
26. Goupil-Othon
27. Grosley-sur-Risle
28. La Houssaye
29. Launay
30. Livet-sur-Authou
31. Manneville-sur-Risle
32. Menneval
33. Mesnil-en-Ouche
34. Montfort-sur-Risle
35. Montreuil-l'Argillé
36. Mélicourt
37. Nassandres sur Risle
38. Neaufles-Auvergny
39. La Neuve-Lyre
40. Notre-Dame-du-Hamel
41. Le Noyer-en-Ouche
42. La Noë-Poulain
43. Pont-Audemer
44. Pont-Authou
45. La Poterie-Mathieu
46. Les Préaux
47. Romilly-la-Puthenaye
48. Rugles
49. Saint-Agnan-de-Cernières
50. Saint-Christophe-sur-Condé
51. Saint-Denis-d'Augerons
52. Saint-Evroult-de-Montfort
53. Saint-Laurent-du-Tencement
54. Saint-Mards-de-Blacarville
55. Saint-Martin-Saint-Firmin
56. Saint-Philbert-sur-Risle
57. Saint-Pierre-de-Cernières
58. Saint-Pierre-de-Salerne
59. Saint-Siméon
60. Saint-Étienne-l'Allier
61. Le Sap-André
62. Selles
63. Serquigny
64. Tourville-sur-Pont-Audemer
65. Toutainville
66. Treis-Sants-en-Ouche
67. La Trinité-de-Réville
68. La Trinité-des-Laitiers
69. Verneusses
70. La Vieille-Lyre

== Conservation ==
The conservation area has eighteen species listed in Annex 2 of the Habitats Directive;

1. Northern crested newt
2. European bullhead
3. Cottus perifretum
4. European river lamprey
5. Brook lamprey
6. Sea lamprey
7. Atlantic salmon
8. White-clawed crayfish
9. Southern damselfly
10. Jersey tiger
11. European stag beetle
12. Orange-spotted emerald
13. Desmoulin's whorl snail
14. Eurasian otter
15. Bechstein's bat
16. Geoffroy's bat
17. Greater mouse-eared bat
18. Greater horseshoe bat

In addition the Natura 2000 site has seven habitats protected under the Habitats Directive.
