= Bois-Anzeray =

- Commune
- Location of Bois-Anzeray
- Location within France Location within Normandy
- Coordinates: 48°55′36″N 0°41′12″E
- Country: France
- Region: Normandy
- Department: Eure
- Arrondissement: Bernay
- Canton: Breteuil

Government
  - Mayor (2020–2026): Jacqueline Gougis
- Area^{1}: 11.61 km^{2} (4.48 sq mi)
- Elevation: 187 m (614 ft)
- Highest elevation: 203 m (666 ft)
- Lowest elevation: 150 m (490 ft)
- Population (2023): 193
  - Density: 16.6/km^{2} (43.1/sq mi)
- Time zone: UTC+01:00 (CET)
  - Summer (DST): UTC+02:00 (CEST)
- INSEE/Postal code: 27068 /27330
- ^{1} French Land Register data, which excludes lakes, ponds, glaciers > 1 km^{2} (0.386 sq mi or 247 acres) and river estuaries.

Bois-Anzeray is a commune in the Eure department in Normandy in northern France.

== Population ==
Historical population
Year	Pop.	±% p.a.
1968	145	—
1975	153	+0.77%
1982	133	−1.98%
1990	148	+1.34%
1999	156	+0.59%
2007	155	−0.08%
2012	172	+2.10%
2017	176	+0.46%
2023	193	+1.55%
Source: INSEE

== See also ==
- Communes of the Eure department
