= Mesnil-Rousset =

- Commune
- Coat of arms
- Location of Mesnil-Rousset
- Location within France Location within Normandy
- Coordinates: 48°53′27″N 0°33′13″E
- Country: France
- Region: Normandy
- Department: Eure
- Arrondissement: Bernay
- Canton: Breteuil

Government
  - Mayor (2020–2026): Didier Malcava
- Area^{1}: 7.22 km^{2} (2.79 sq mi)
- Elevation: 241 m (791 ft)
- Highest elevation: 238 m (781 ft)
- Lowest elevation: 208 m (682 ft)
- Population (2023): 82
  - Density: 11/km^{2} (29/sq mi)
- Time zone: UTC+01:00 (CET)
  - Summer (DST): UTC+02:00 (CEST)
- INSEE/Postal code: 27404 /27390
- ^{1} French Land Register data, which excludes lakes, ponds, glaciers > 1 km^{2} (0.386 sq mi or 247 acres) and river estuaries.

Mesnil-Rousset (French pronunciation: [menil ʁusɛ]) is a commune in the Eure department in Normandy in northern France.

== Population ==
Historical population
Year	Pop.	±% p.a.
1968	120	—
1975	101	−2.43%
1982	89	−1.79%
1990	90	+0.14%
1999	92	+0.24%
2007	110	+2.26%
2012	110	+0.00%
2017	93	−3.30%
2023	82	−2.08%
Source: INSEE

== See also ==
- Communes of the Eure department
