= Saint-Agnan-de-Cernières =

- Commune
- Coat of arms
- Location of Saint-Agnan-de-Cernières
- Location within France Location within Normandy
- Coordinates: 48°57′15″N 0°31′04″E
- Country: France
- Region: Normandy
- Department: Eure
- Arrondissement: Bernay
- Canton: Breteuil

Government
  - Mayor (2020–2026): Michel Thouin
- Area^{1}: 7.42 km^{2} (2.86 sq mi)
- Elevation: 160 m (520 ft)
- Highest elevation: 211 m (692 ft)
- Lowest elevation: 150 m (490 ft)
- Population (2023): 148
  - Density: 19.9/km^{2} (51.7/sq mi)
- Time zone: UTC+01:00 (CET)
  - Summer (DST): UTC+02:00 (CEST)
- INSEE/Postal code: 27505 /27390
- ^{1} French Land Register data, which excludes lakes, ponds, glaciers > 1 km^{2} (0.386 sq mi or 247 acres) and river estuaries.

Saint-Agnan-de-Cernières (French pronunciation: [sɛ̃.t‿aɲɑ̃ də sɛʁnjɛʁ]) is a commune in the Eure department in Normandy in northern France.

== Geography ==
The commune along with another 69 communes shares part of a 4,747 hectare, Natura 2000 conservation area, called Risle, Guiel, Charentonne.

== Population ==
Historical population
Year	Pop.	±% p.a.
1968	136	—
1975	131	−0.53%
1982	140	+0.95%
1990	124	−1.51%
1999	122	−0.18%
2007	135	+1.27%
2012	138	+0.44%
2017	161	+3.13%
2023	148	−1.39%
Source: INSEE

== See also ==
- Communes of the Eure department
