= Verneusses =

- Commune
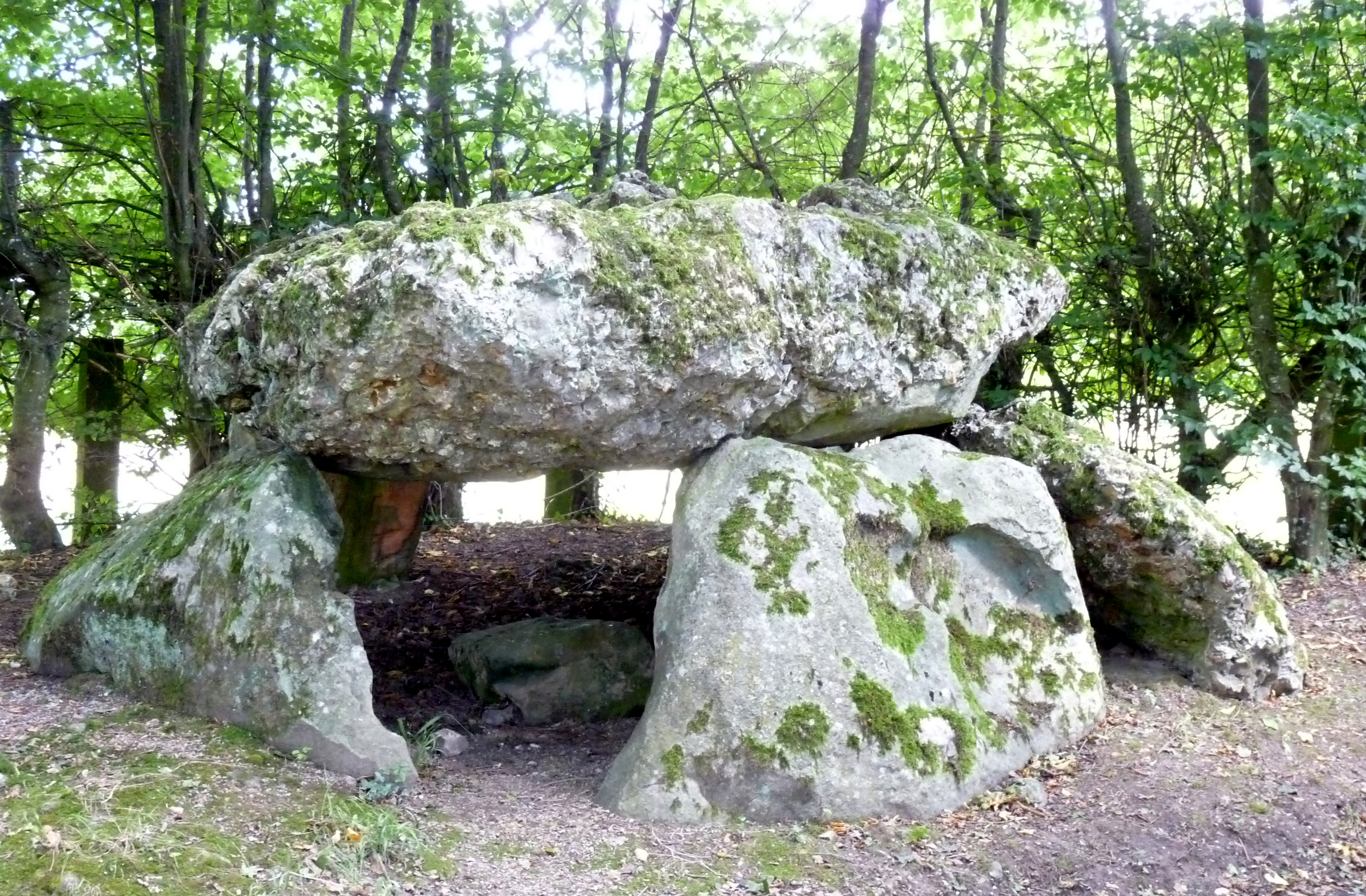
- The dolmen in Verneusses

- Coat of arms
- Location of Verneusses
- Location within France Location within Normandy
- Coordinates: 48°54′13″N 0°27′04″E
- Country: France
- Region: Normandy
- Department: Eure
- Arrondissement: Bernay
- Canton: Breteuil

Government
  - Mayor (2020–2026): Patrick Lhomme
- Area^{1}: 16.15 km^{2} (6.24 sq mi)
- Elevation: 226 m (741 ft)
- Highest elevation: 246 m (807 ft)
- Lowest elevation: 182 m (597 ft)
- Population (2023): 176
  - Density: 10.9/km^{2} (28.2/sq mi)
- Time zone: UTC+01:00 (CET)
  - Summer (DST): UTC+02:00 (CEST)
- INSEE/Postal code: 27680 /27390
- ^{1} French Land Register data, which excludes lakes, ponds, glaciers > 1 km^{2} (0.386 sq mi or 247 acres) and river estuaries.

Verneusses (French pronunciation: [vɛʁnøs]) is a commune in the Eure department in Normandy in northern France.

== Geography ==
The commune along with another 69 communes shares part of a 4,747 hectare, Natura 2000 conservation area, called Risle, Guiel, Charentonne.

== Population ==
Historical population
| Year | Pop. | ±% p.a. |
|---|---|---|
| 1968 | 304 | — |
| 1975 | 252 | −2.64% |
| 1982 | 244 | −0.46% |
| 1990 | 203 | −2.27% |
| 1999 | 224 | +1.10% |
| 2007 | 224 | +0.00% |
| 2012 | 204 | −1.85% |
| 2017 | 201 | −0.30% |
| 2023 | 176 | −2.19% |
Source: INSEE

== See also ==
- Communes of the Eure department
