= Grand-Camp, Eure =

Grand-Camp
- Commune
- Location of Grand-Camp
- Location within France Location within Normandy
- Coordinates: 49°02′46″N 0°31′40″E
- Country: France
- Region: Normandy
- Department: Eure
- Arrondissement: Bernay
- Canton: Breteuil

Government
  - Mayor (2020–2026): Philippe Boullier
- Area^{1}: 14.11 km^{2} (5.45 sq mi)
- Elevation: 189 m (620 ft)
- Highest elevation: 187 m (614 ft)
- Lowest elevation: 135 m (443 ft)
- Population (2023): 452
  - Density: 32.0/km^{2} (83.0/sq mi)
- Time zone: UTC+01:00 (CET)
  - Summer (DST): UTC+02:00 (CEST)
- INSEE/Postal code: 27295 /27270
- ^{1} French Land Register data, which excludes lakes, ponds, glaciers > 1 km^{2} (0.386 sq mi or 247 acres) and river estuaries.

Grand-Camp (French pronunciation: [ɡʁɑ̃ kɑ̃]) is a commune in the Eure department in northern France.

== Population ==
Historical population
Year	Pop.	±% p.a.
1968	298	—
1975	334	+1.64%
1982	471	+5.03%
1990	485	+0.37%
1999	453	−0.76%
2007	427	−0.74%
2012	466	+1.76%
2017	493	+1.13%
2023	452	−1.44%
Source: INSEE

== See also ==
- Communes of the Eure department
