= La Chapelle-Gauthier, Eure =

La Chapelle-Gauthier
- Commune
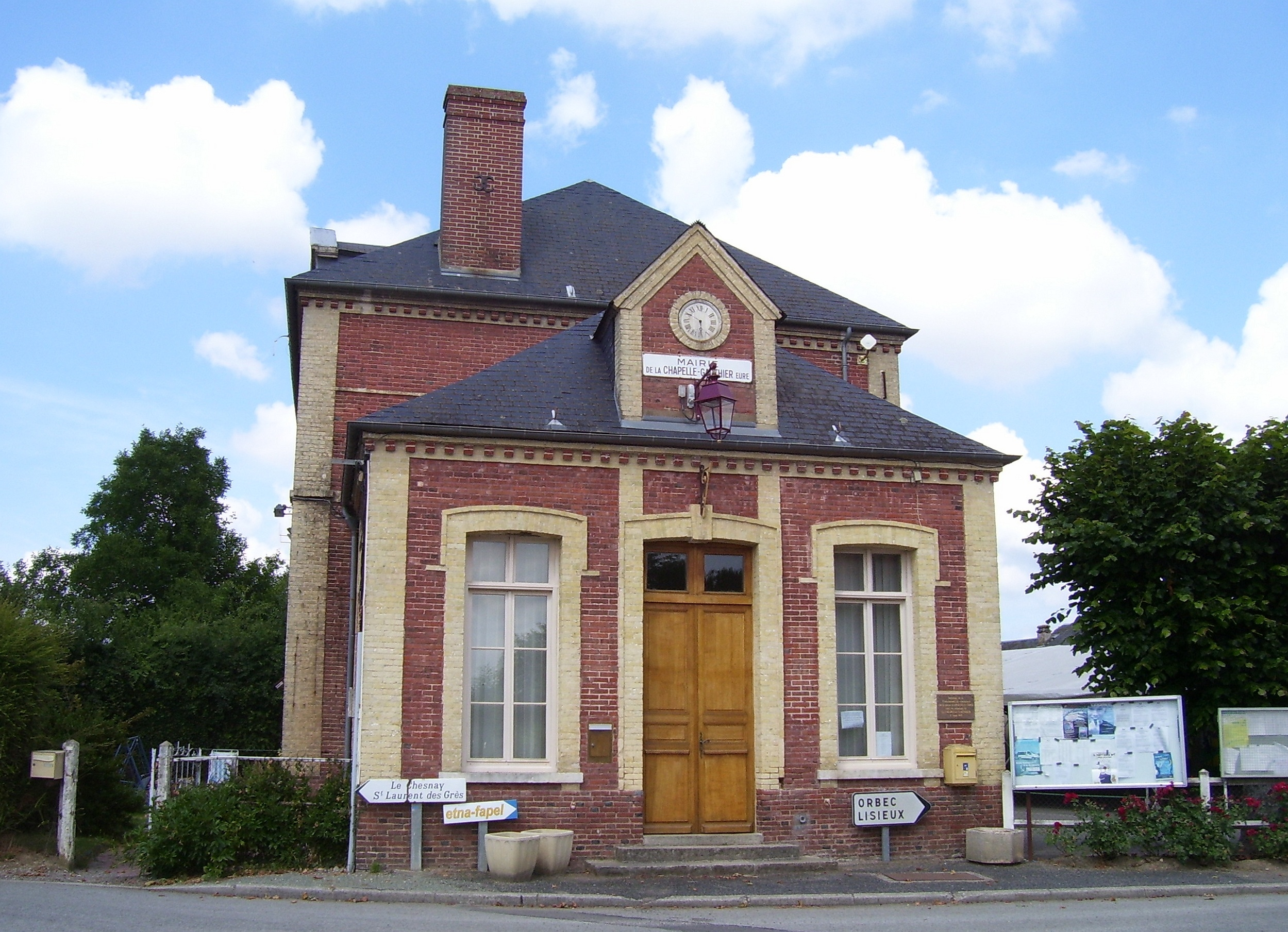
- Town hall
- Location of La Chapelle-Gauthier
- Location within France Location within Normandy
- Coordinates: 48°59′13″N 0°27′47″E
- Country: France
- Region: Normandy
- Department: Eure
- Arrondissement: Bernay
- Canton: Breteuil
- Intercommunality: Bernay Terres de Normandie

Government
  - Mayor (2020–2026): Pascal Laignel
- Area^{1}: 16.43 km^{2} (6.34 sq mi)
- Elevation: 201 m (659 ft)
- Highest elevation: 207 m (679 ft)
- Lowest elevation: 144 m (472 ft)
- Population (2023): 406
  - Density: 24.7/km^{2} (64.0/sq mi)
- Time zone: UTC+01:00 (CET)
  - Summer (DST): UTC+02:00 (CEST)
- INSEE/Postal code: 27148 /27270
- ^{1} French Land Register data, which excludes lakes, ponds, glaciers > 1 km^{2} (0.386 sq mi or 247 acres) and river estuaries.

La Chapelle-Gauthier (French pronunciation: [la ʃapɛl ɡotje]) is a commune in the Eure department in northern France.

== Population ==
Historical population
Year	Pop.	±% p.a.
1968	426	—
1975	365	−2.18%
1982	349	−0.64%
1990	350	+0.04%
1999	381	+0.95%
2007	347	−1.16%
2012	399	+2.83%
2017	398	−0.05%
2023	406	+0.33%
Source: INSEE

== See also ==
- Communes of the Eure department
