= Les Baux-de-Breteuil =

- Commune
- Location of Les Baux-de-Breteuil
- Location within France Location within Normandy
- Coordinates: 48°52′50″N 0°48′46″E
- Country: France
- Region: Normandy
- Department: Eure
- Arrondissement: Évreux
- Canton: Breteuil
- Intercommunality: CC Interco Normandie Sud Eure

Government
  - Mayor (2020–2026): Antoine Noel
- Area^{1}: 34.22 km^{2} (13.21 sq mi)
- Elevation: 185 m (607 ft)
- Highest elevation: 199 m (653 ft)
- Lowest elevation: 160 m (520 ft)
- Population (2023): 673
  - Density: 19.7/km^{2} (50.9/sq mi)
- Time zone: UTC+01:00 (CET)
  - Summer (DST): UTC+02:00 (CEST)
- INSEE/Postal code: 27043 /27160
- ^{1} French Land Register data, which excludes lakes, ponds, glaciers > 1 km^{2} (0.386 sq mi or 247 acres) and river estuaries.

Les Baux-de-Breteuil (French pronunciation: [le bo də bʁətœj]) is a commune in the Eure department and Normandy region of northern France.

== Population ==
Historical population
Year	Pop.	±% p.a.
1968	529	—
1975	517	−0.33%
1982	564	+1.25%
1990	561	−0.07%
1999	578	+0.33%
2007	625	+0.98%
2012	672	+1.46%
2017	664	−0.24%
2023	673	+0.22%
Source: INSEE

== See also ==
- Communes of the Eure department
