= Émanville =

Émanville may refer to the following communes in France:

- Émanville, Eure, in the Eure département
- Émanville, Seine-Maritime, in the Seine-Maritime département
