= Daubeuf =

Daubeuf may refer to:

- Daubeuf-près-Vatteville, a commune in the Eure department in northern France.
- Daubeuf-Serville, a commune in the Seine-Maritime department in the Normandy region of northern France.
- Daubeuf-la-Campagne, a commune in the Eure department in north-western France.
