= Hectomare =

- Commune
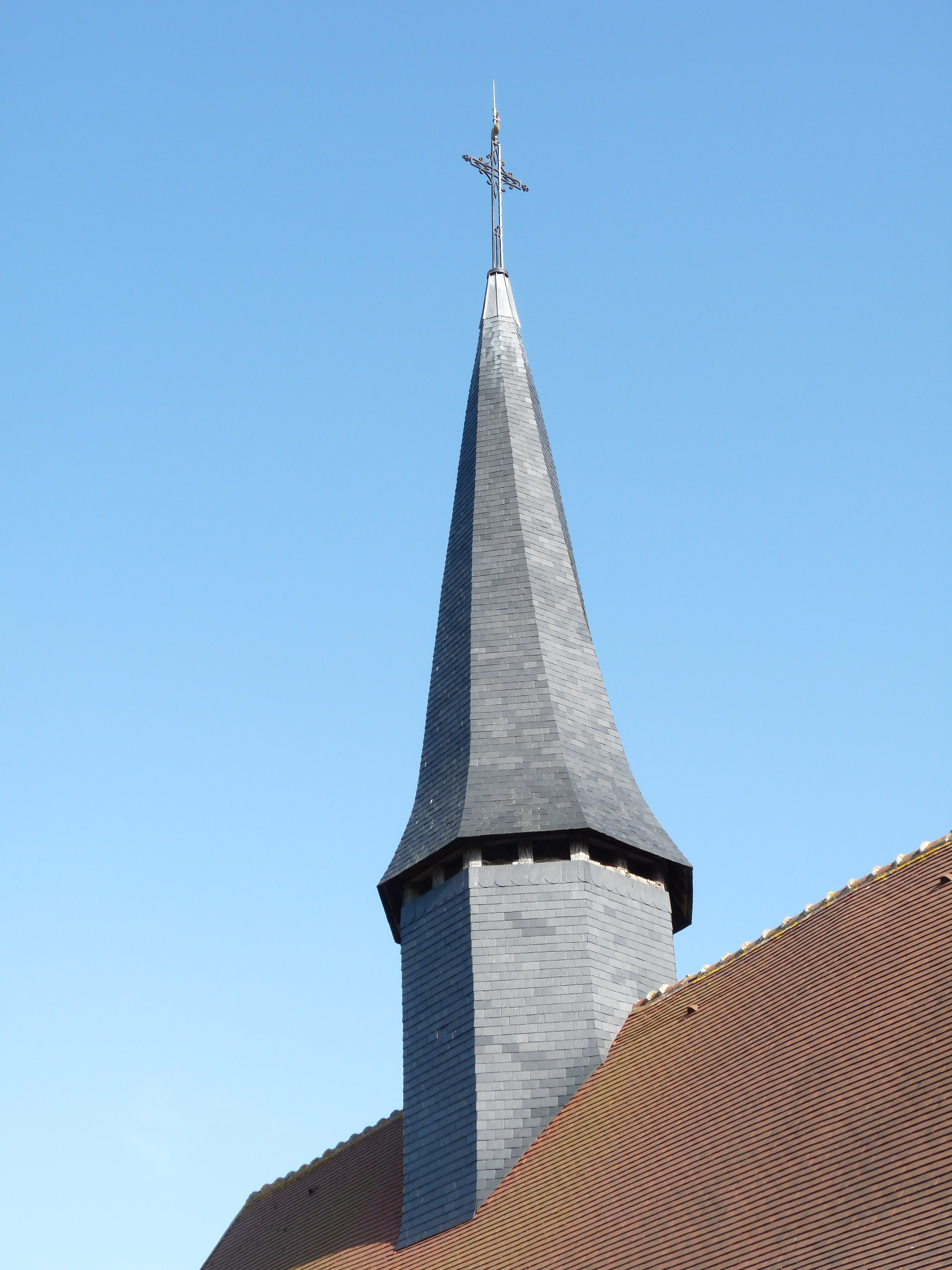
- The bell tower of the church of Saint-Taurin in Hectomare
- Location of Hectomare
- Location within France Location within Normandy
- Coordinates: 49°11′25″N 0°56′55″E
- Country: France
- Region: Normandy
- Department: Eure
- Arrondissement: Bernay
- Canton: Le Neubourg

Government
  - Mayor (2020–2026): François Ployart
- Area^{1}: 2.05 km^{2} (0.79 sq mi)
- Elevation: 143 m (469 ft)
- Highest elevation: 156 m (512 ft)
- Lowest elevation: 144 m (472 ft)
- Population (2023): 220
  - Density: 110/km^{2} (280/sq mi)
- Time zone: UTC+01:00 (CET)
  - Summer (DST): UTC+02:00 (CEST)
- INSEE/Postal code: 27327 /27110
- ^{1} French Land Register data, which excludes lakes, ponds, glaciers > 1 km^{2} (0.386 sq mi or 247 acres) and river estuaries.

Hectomare (French pronunciation: [ɛktɔmaʁ]) is a commune in the Eure department in northern France.

== Population ==
Historical population
Year	Pop.	±% p.a.
1968	138	—
1975	144	+0.61%
1982	138	−0.61%
1990	166	+2.34%
1999	184	+1.15%
2007	216	+2.02%
2012	228	+1.09%
2017	219	−0.80%
2023	220	+0.08%
Source: INSEE

== See also ==
- Communes of the Eure department
