= Saint-Aubin-d'Écrosville =

- Commune
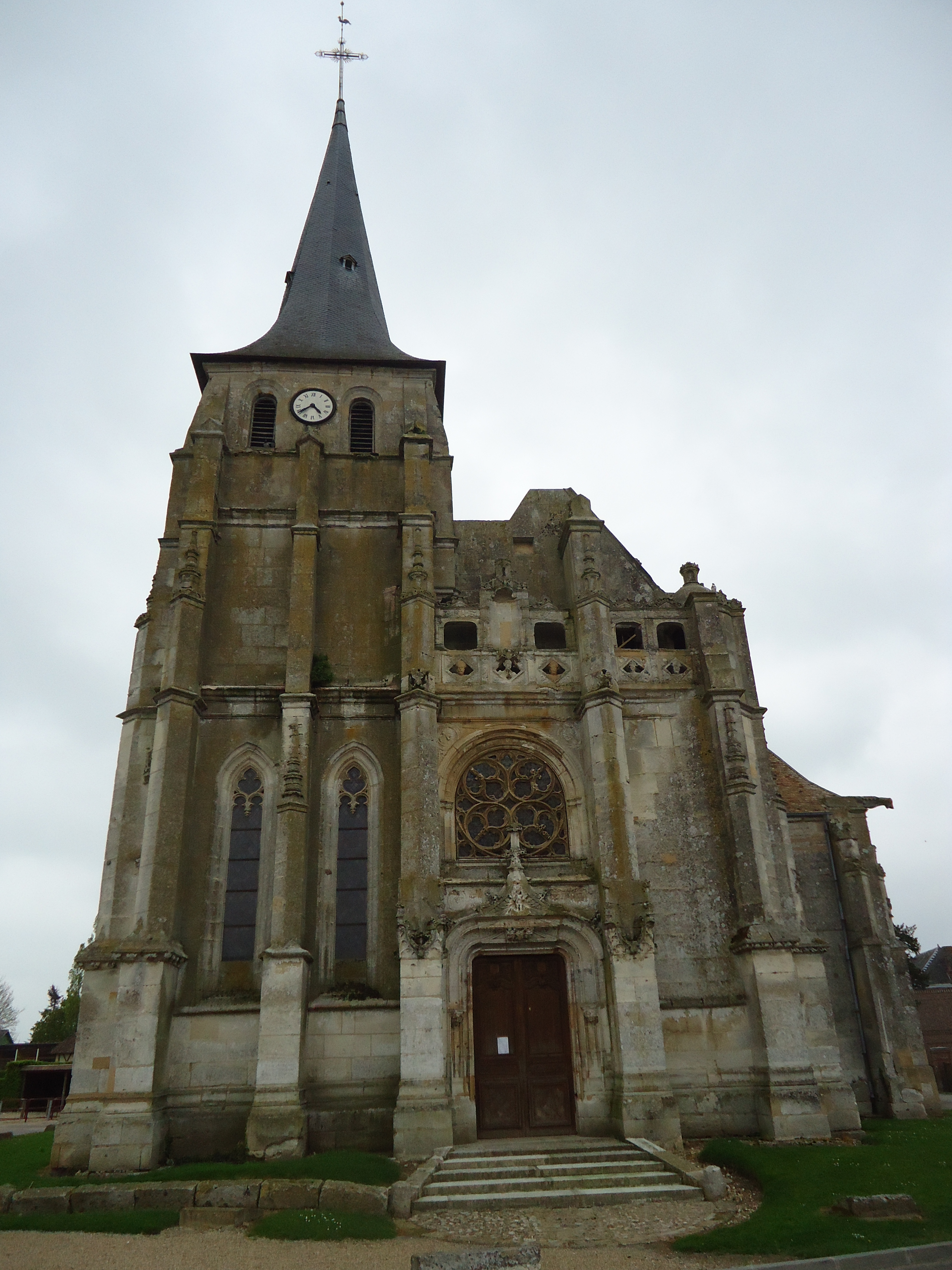
- The church in Saint-Aubin-d'Écrosville
- Location of Saint-Aubin-d'Écrosville
- Location within France Location within Normandy
- Coordinates: 49°08′36″N 0°59′50″E
- Country: France
- Region: Normandy
- Department: Eure
- Arrondissement: Bernay
- Canton: Le Neubourg

Government
  - Mayor (2025–2026): Thierry Orona
- Area^{1}: 14.6 km^{2} (5.6 sq mi)
- Elevation: 145 m (476 ft)
- Highest elevation: 156 m (512 ft)
- Lowest elevation: 98 m (322 ft)
- Population (2023): 759
  - Density: 52.0/km^{2} (135/sq mi)
- Time zone: UTC+01:00 (CET)
  - Summer (DST): UTC+02:00 (CEST)
- INSEE/Postal code: 27511 /27110
- ^{1} French Land Register data, which excludes lakes, ponds, glaciers > 1 km^{2} (0.386 sq mi or 247 acres) and river estuaries.

Saint-Aubin-d'Écrosville is a commune in the Eure department and Normandy region in northern France.

== Population ==
Historical population
Year	Pop.	±% p.a.
1968	466	—
1975	521	+1.61%
1982	508	−0.36%
1990	540	+0.77%
1999	563	+0.46%
2007	635	+1.52%
2012	674	+1.20%
2017	709	+1.02%
2023	759	+1.14%
Source: INSEE

== See also ==
- Communes of the Eure department
