= Le Tremblay-Omonville =

- Commune
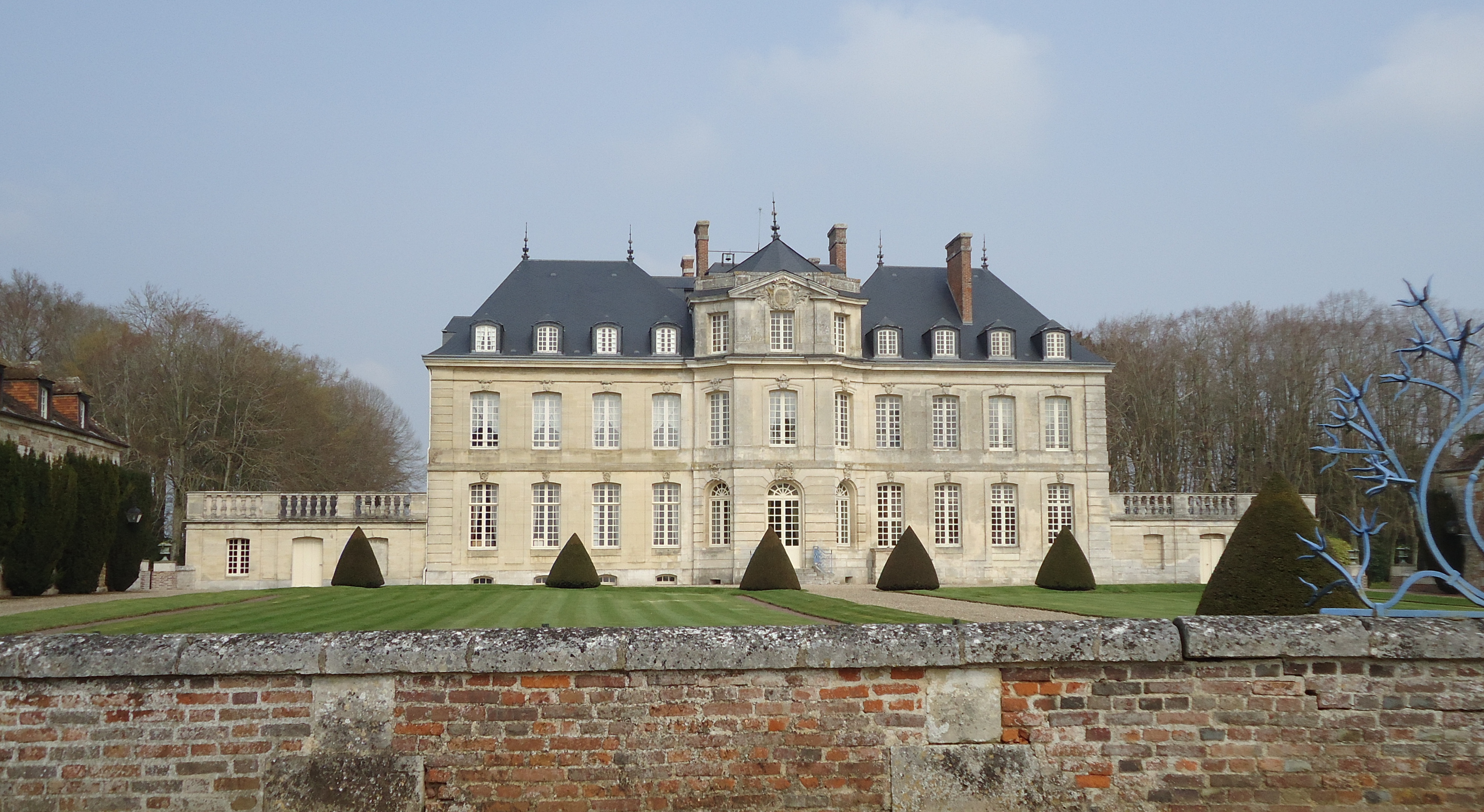
- The chateau of Omonville
- Location of Le Tremblay-Omonville
- Location within France Location within Normandy
- Coordinates: 49°07′16″N 0°54′53″E
- Country: France
- Region: Normandy
- Department: Eure
- Arrondissement: Bernay
- Canton: Le Neubourg

Government
  - Mayor (2020–2026): Jean-François Lefebvre
- Area^{1}: 5.41 km^{2} (2.09 sq mi)
- Elevation: 148 m (486 ft)
- Highest elevation: 145 m (476 ft)
- Lowest elevation: 129 m (423 ft)
- Population (2023): 391
  - Density: 72.3/km^{2} (187/sq mi)
- Time zone: UTC+01:00 (CET)
  - Summer (DST): UTC+02:00 (CEST)
- INSEE/Postal code: 27658 /27110
- ^{1} French Land Register data, which excludes lakes, ponds, glaciers > 1 km^{2} (0.386 sq mi or 247 acres) and river estuaries.

Le Tremblay-Omonville (French pronunciation: [lə tʁɑ̃blɛ ɔmɔ̃vil], before 1953: Le Tremblay) is a commune in the Eure department in Normandy in northern France.

== Population ==
Historical population
Year	Pop.	±% p.a.
1968	144	—
1975	187	+3.80%
1982	199	+0.89%
1990	241	+2.42%
1999	270	+1.27%
2007	285	+0.68%
2012	326	+2.72%
2017	342	+0.96%
2023	391	+2.26%
Source: INSEE

== See also ==
- Communes of the Eure department
