= Vraiville =

- Commune
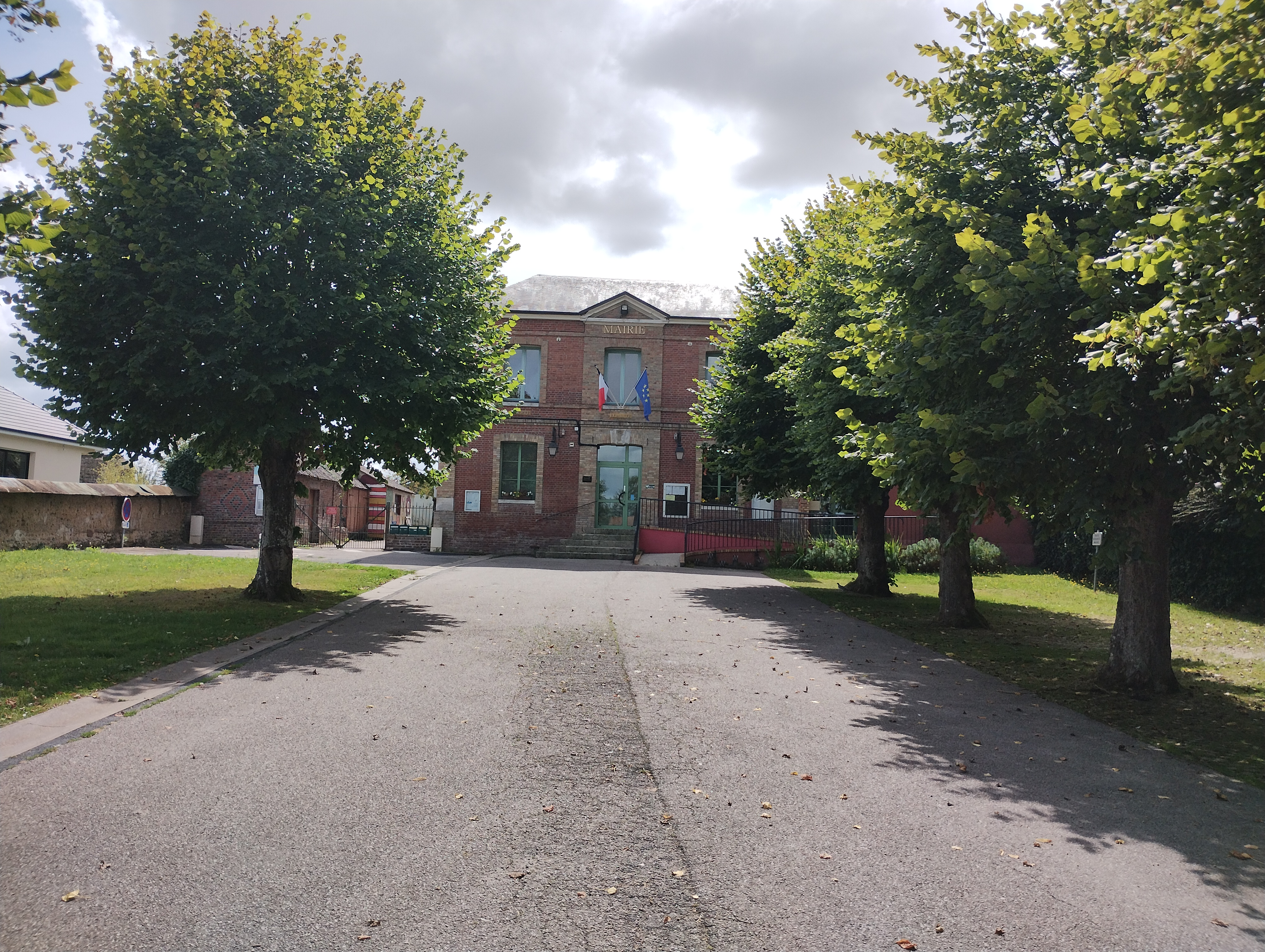
- Vraiville Town hall
- Location of Vraiville
- Location within France Location within Normandy
- Coordinates: 49°13′16″N 1°02′31″E
- Country: France
- Region: Normandy
- Department: Eure
- Arrondissement: Bernay
- Canton: Le Neubourg
- Intercommunality: Seine-Eure

Government
  - Mayor (2020–2026): Hervé Gamblin
- Area^{1}: 6.82 km^{2} (2.63 sq mi)
- Elevation: 167 m (548 ft)
- Highest elevation: 164 m (538 ft)
- Lowest elevation: 115 m (377 ft)
- Population (2023): 721
  - Density: 106/km^{2} (274/sq mi)
- Time zone: UTC+01:00 (CET)
  - Summer (DST): UTC+02:00 (CEST)
- INSEE/Postal code: 27700 /27370
- ^{1} French Land Register data, which excludes lakes, ponds, glaciers > 1 km^{2} (0.386 sq mi or 247 acres) and river estuaries.

Vraiville (French pronunciation: [vʁɛvil]) is a commune in the Eure department in Normandy in northern France.

== Population ==
Historical population
Year	Pop.	±% p.a.
1968	300	—
1975	346	+2.06%
1982	409	+2.42%
1990	458	+1.42%
1999	477	+0.45%
2007	559	+2.00%
2012	610	+1.76%
2017	691	+2.52%
2023	721	+0.71%
Source: INSEE

== See also ==
- Communes of the Eure department
