= Écauville =

- Commune
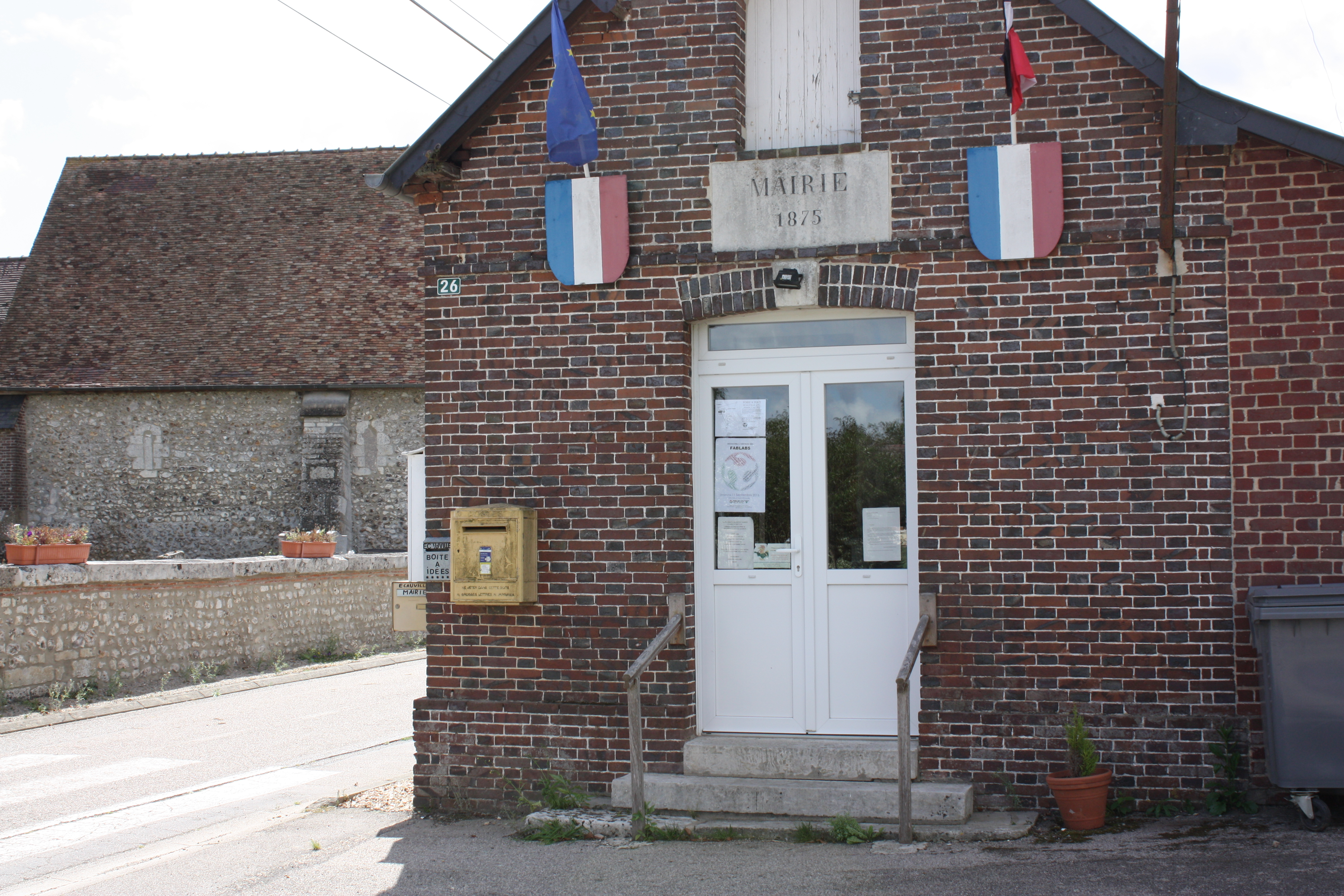
- The town hall in Écauville
- Location of Écauville
- Location within France Location within Normandy
- Coordinates: 49°07′32″N 0°59′35″E
- Country: France
- Region: Normandy
- Department: Eure
- Arrondissement: Bernay
- Canton: Le Neubourg

Government
  - Mayor (2020–2026): Françoise Maillard
- Area^{1}: 3.35 km^{2} (1.29 sq mi)
- Elevation: 162 m (531 ft)
- Highest elevation: 149 m (489 ft)
- Lowest elevation: 119 m (390 ft)
- Population (2023): 116
  - Density: 34.6/km^{2} (89.7/sq mi)
- Time zone: UTC+01:00 (CET)
  - Summer (DST): UTC+02:00 (CEST)
- INSEE/Postal code: 27212 /27110
- ^{1} French Land Register data, which excludes lakes, ponds, glaciers > 1 km^{2} (0.386 sq mi or 247 acres) and river estuaries.

Écauville (French pronunciation: [ekovil]) is a commune in the Eure department in northern France.

== Population ==
Historical population
Year	Pop.	±% p.a.
1968	53	—
1975	53	+0.00%
1982	57	+1.04%
1990	74	+3.32%
1999	73	−0.15%
2007	111	+5.38%
2012	115	+0.71%
2017	111	−0.71%
2023	116	+0.74%
Source: INSEE

== See also ==
- Communes of the Eure department
