= Sacquenville =

- Commune
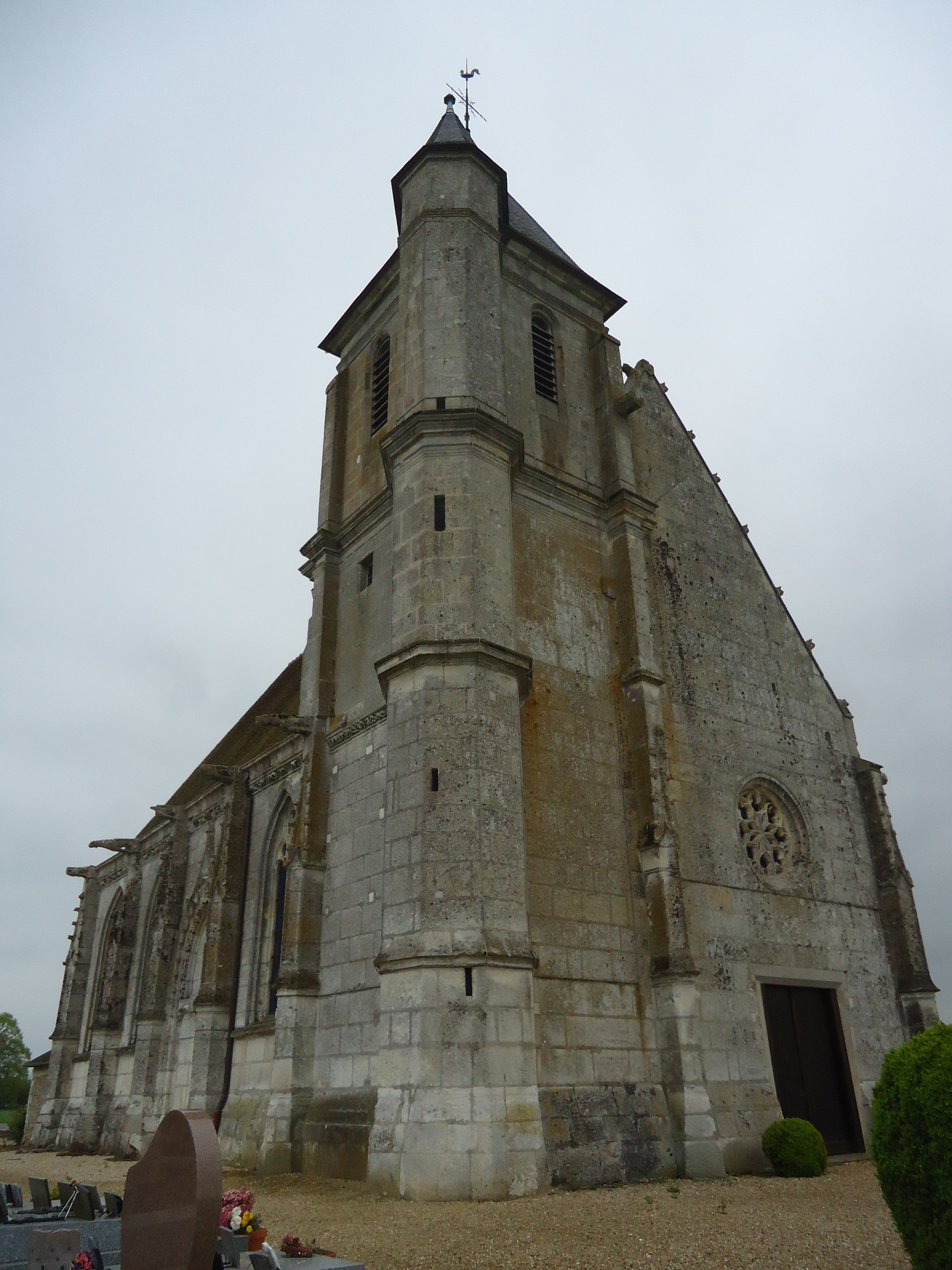
- The church in Sacquenville

- Coat of arms
- Location of Sacquenville
- Location within France Location within Normandy
- Coordinates: 49°05′03″N 1°04′25″E
- Country: France
- Region: Normandy
- Department: Eure
- Arrondissement: Évreux
- Canton: Le Neubourg
- Intercommunality: CA Évreux Portes de Normandie

Government
  - Mayor (2022–2026): Richard Finix
- Area^{1}: 9.97 km^{2} (3.85 sq mi)
- Elevation: 147 m (482 ft)
- Highest elevation: 149 m (489 ft)
- Lowest elevation: 63 m (207 ft)
- Population (2023): 1,205
  - Density: 121/km^{2} (313/sq mi)
- Time zone: UTC+01:00 (CET)
  - Summer (DST): UTC+02:00 (CEST)
- INSEE/Postal code: 27504 /27930
- ^{1} French Land Register data, which excludes lakes, ponds, glaciers > 1 km^{2} (0.386 sq mi or 247 acres) and river estuaries.

Sacquenville (French pronunciation: [sakɑ̃vil]) is a commune in the Eure department in Normandy in northern France.

== Population ==
Historical population
| Year | Pop. | ±% p.a. |
|---|---|---|
| 1968 | 353 | — |
| 1975 | 414 | +2.30% |
| 1982 | 504 | +2.85% |
| 1990 | 613 | +2.48% |
| 1999 | 768 | +2.54% |
| 2007 | 964 | +2.88% |
| 2012 | 1,125 | +3.14% |
| 2017 | 1,231 | +1.82% |
| 2023 | 1,205 | −0.36% |
Source: INSEE

== See also ==
- Communes of the Eure department
