= Épégard =

- Commune
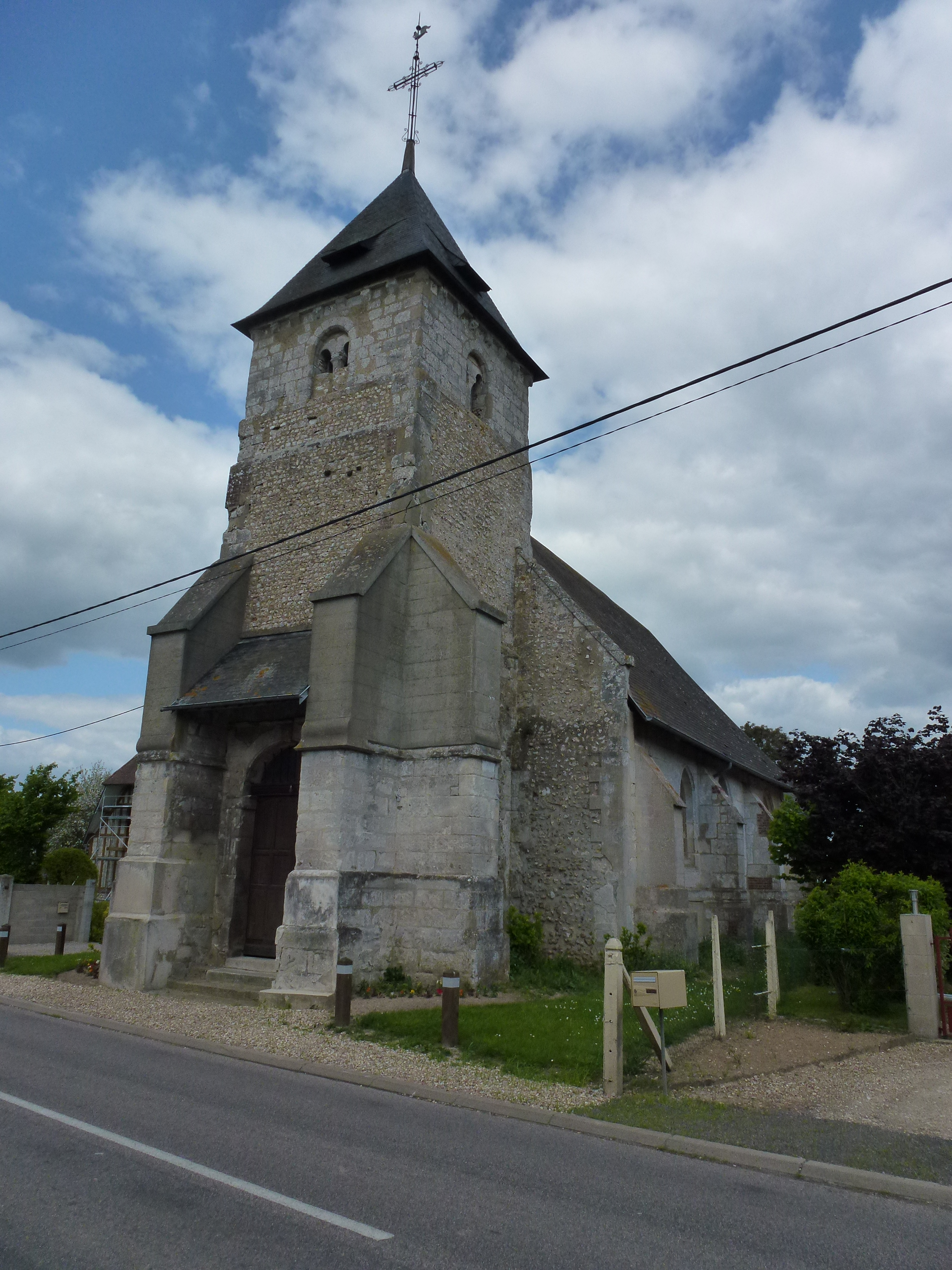
- The church in Épégard
- Location of Épégard
- Location within France Location within Normandy
- Coordinates: 49°10′51″N 0°52′44″E
- Country: France
- Region: Normandy
- Department: Eure
- Arrondissement: Bernay
- Canton: Le Neubourg

Government
  - Mayor (2020–2026): Pascal Demare
- Area^{1}: 4.41 km^{2} (1.70 sq mi)
- Elevation: 145 m (476 ft)
- Highest elevation: 148 m (486 ft)
- Lowest elevation: 131 m (430 ft)
- Population (2023): 523
  - Density: 119/km^{2} (307/sq mi)
- Time zone: UTC+01:00 (CET)
  - Summer (DST): UTC+02:00 (CEST)
- INSEE/Postal code: 27219 /27110
- ^{1} French Land Register data, which excludes lakes, ponds, glaciers > 1 km^{2} (0.386 sq mi or 247 acres) and river estuaries.

Épégard (French pronunciation: [epeɡaʁ]) is a commune in the Eure department in northern France.

== Population ==
Historical population
Year	Pop.	±% p.a.
1968	261	—
1975	258	−0.17%
1982	340	+4.02%
1990	416	+2.55%
1999	406	−0.27%
2007	432	+0.78%
2012	541	+4.60%
2017	574	+1.19%
2023	523	−1.54%
Source: INSEE

== See also ==
- Communes of the Eure department
