= Bernienville =

- Commune
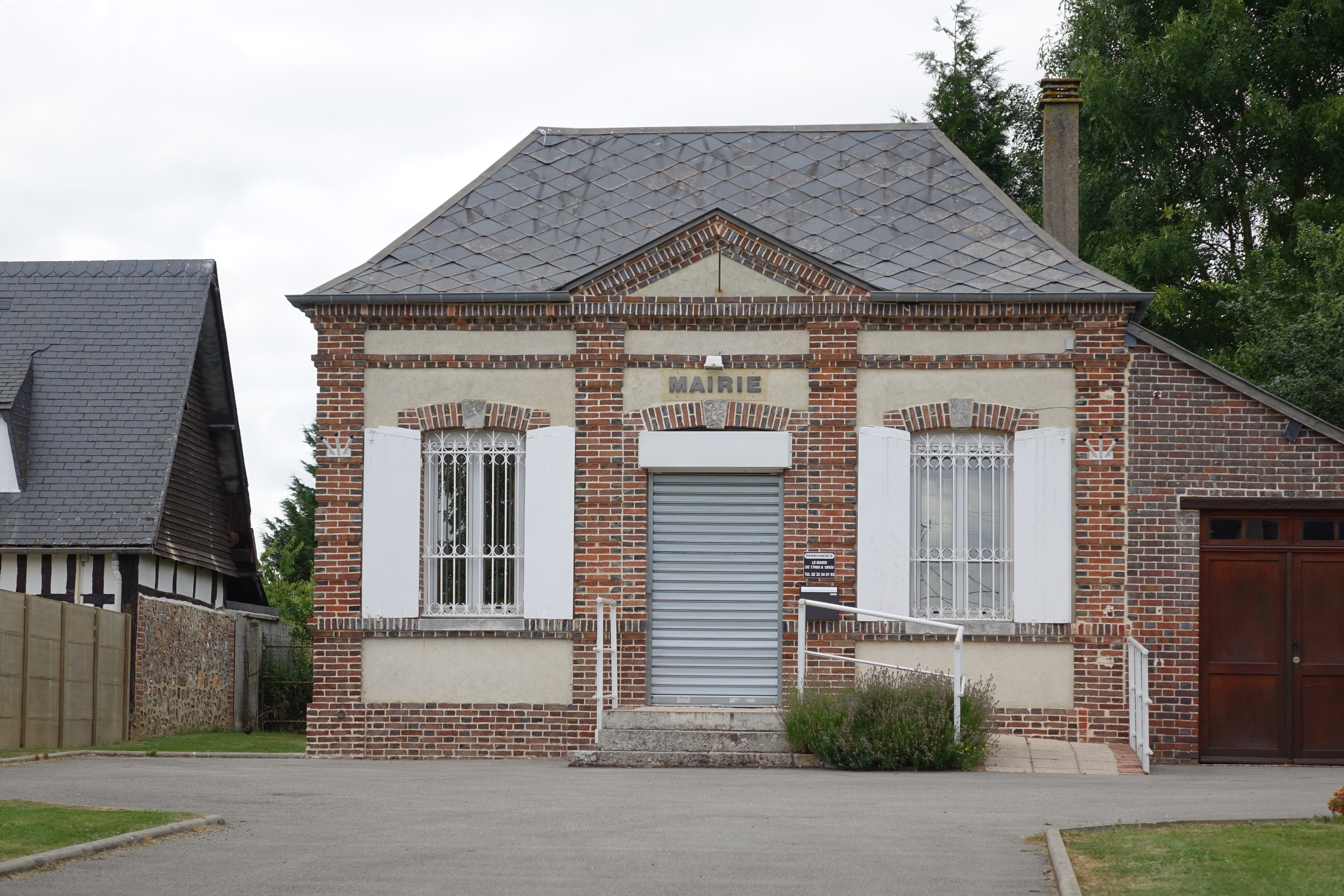
- The town hall in Bernienville
- Location of Bernienville
- Location within France Location within Normandy
- Coordinates: 49°05′01″N 1°01′10″E
- Country: France
- Region: Normandy
- Department: Eure
- Arrondissement: Bernay
- Canton: Le Neubourg
- Intercommunality: Pays du Neubourg

Government
  - Mayor (2020–2026): Christian Duclos
- Area^{1}: 7.81 km^{2} (3.02 sq mi)
- Elevation: 139 m (456 ft)
- Highest elevation: 151 m (495 ft)
- Lowest elevation: 136 m (446 ft)
- Population (2023): 298
  - Density: 38.2/km^{2} (98.8/sq mi)
- Time zone: UTC+01:00 (CET)
  - Summer (DST): UTC+02:00 (CEST)
- INSEE/Postal code: 27057 /27180
- ^{1} French Land Register data, which excludes lakes, ponds, glaciers > 1 km^{2} (0.386 sq mi or 247 acres) and river estuaries.

Bernienville (French pronunciation: [bɛʁnjɛ̃vil]) is a commune in the Eure department in Normandy in northern France.

== Population ==
Historical population
Year	Pop.	±% p.a.
1968	166	—
1975	184	+1.48%
1982	232	+3.37%
1990	239	+0.37%
1999	246	+0.32%
2007	263	+0.84%
2012	275	+0.90%
2017	288	+0.93%
2023	298	+0.57%
Source: INSEE

== See also ==
- Communes of the Eure department
