= Crosville-la-Vieille =

- Commune
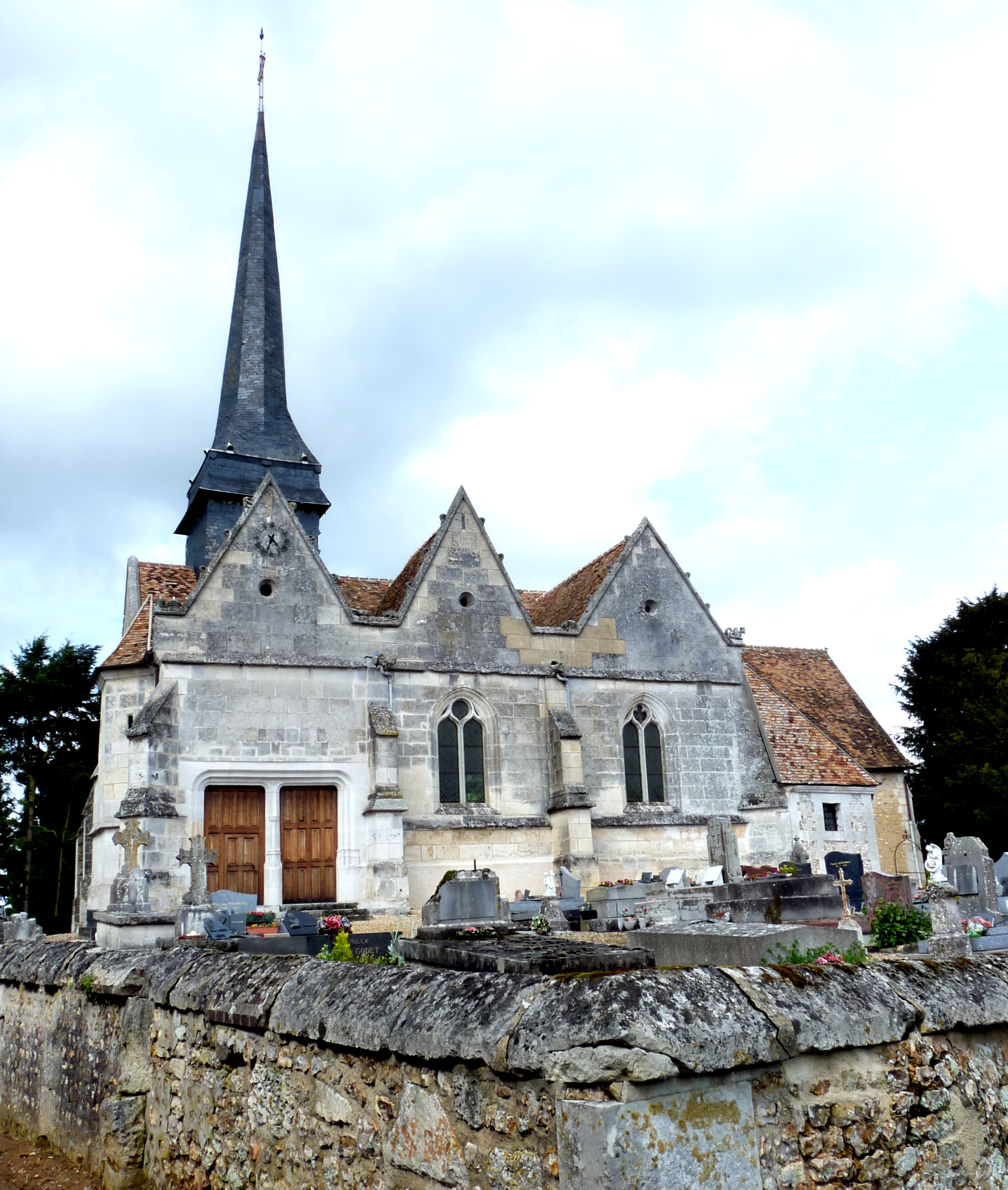
- The church in Crosville-la-Vieille

- Coat of arms
- Location of Crosville-la-Vieille
- Location within France Location within Normandy
- Coordinates: 49°09′22″N 0°55′51″E
- Country: France
- Region: Normandy
- Department: Eure
- Arrondissement: Bernay
- Canton: Le Neubourg

Government
  - Mayor (2020–2026): Pascal Carpentier
- Area^{1}: 7.74 km^{2} (2.99 sq mi)
- Highest elevation: 157 m (515 ft)
- Lowest elevation: 137 m (449 ft)
- Population (2023): 613
  - Density: 79.2/km^{2} (205/sq mi)
- Time zone: UTC+01:00 (CET)
  - Summer (DST): UTC+02:00 (CEST)
- INSEE/Postal code: 27192 /27110
- ^{1} French Land Register data, which excludes lakes, ponds, glaciers > 1 km^{2} (0.386 sq mi or 247 acres) and river estuaries.

Crosville-la-Vieille is a commune in the Eure department in northern France.

== Population ==
Historical population
Year	Pop.	±% p.a.
1968	240	—
1975	233	−0.42%
1982	276	+2.45%
1990	427	+5.61%
1999	489	+1.52%
2007	564	+1.80%
2012	568	+0.14%
2017	603	+1.20%
2023	613	+0.27%
Source: INSEE

== See also ==
- Communes of the Eure department
