= Canton of Le Neubourg =

Coordinates: 49.15°N 0.90°E

The canton of Le Neubourg is an administrative division of the Eure department, northern France. Its borders were modified at the French canton reorganisation which came into effect in March 2015. Its seat is in Le Neubourg.

It consists of the following communes:

1. Bacquepuis
2. Bérengeville-la-Campagne
3. Bernienville
4. Le Bosc-du-Theil
5. Brosville
6. Canappeville
7. Cesseville
8. Crestot
9. Criquebeuf-la-Campagne
10. Crosville-la-Vieille
11. Daubeuf-la-Campagne
12. Écauville
13. Ecquetot
14. Émanville
15. Épégard
16. Épreville-près-le-Neubourg
17. Feuguerolles
18. Graveron-Sémerville
19. Hectomare
20. Hondouville
21. Houetteville
22. Iville
23. Mandeville
24. Marbeuf
25. Le Mesnil-Fuguet
26. Le Neubourg
27. La Pyle
28. Quittebeuf
29. Sacquenville
30. Saint-Aubin-d'Écrosville
31. Sainte-Colombe-la-Commanderie
32. Saint-Martin-la-Campagne
33. Saint-Meslin-du-Bosc
34. Le Tilleul-Lambert
35. Tournedos-Bois-Hubert
36. Tourneville
37. Le Tremblay-Omonville
38. Le Troncq
39. Venon
40. Villettes
41. Villez-sur-le-Neubourg
42. Vitot
43. Vraiville
