= Graveron-Sémerville =

- Commune
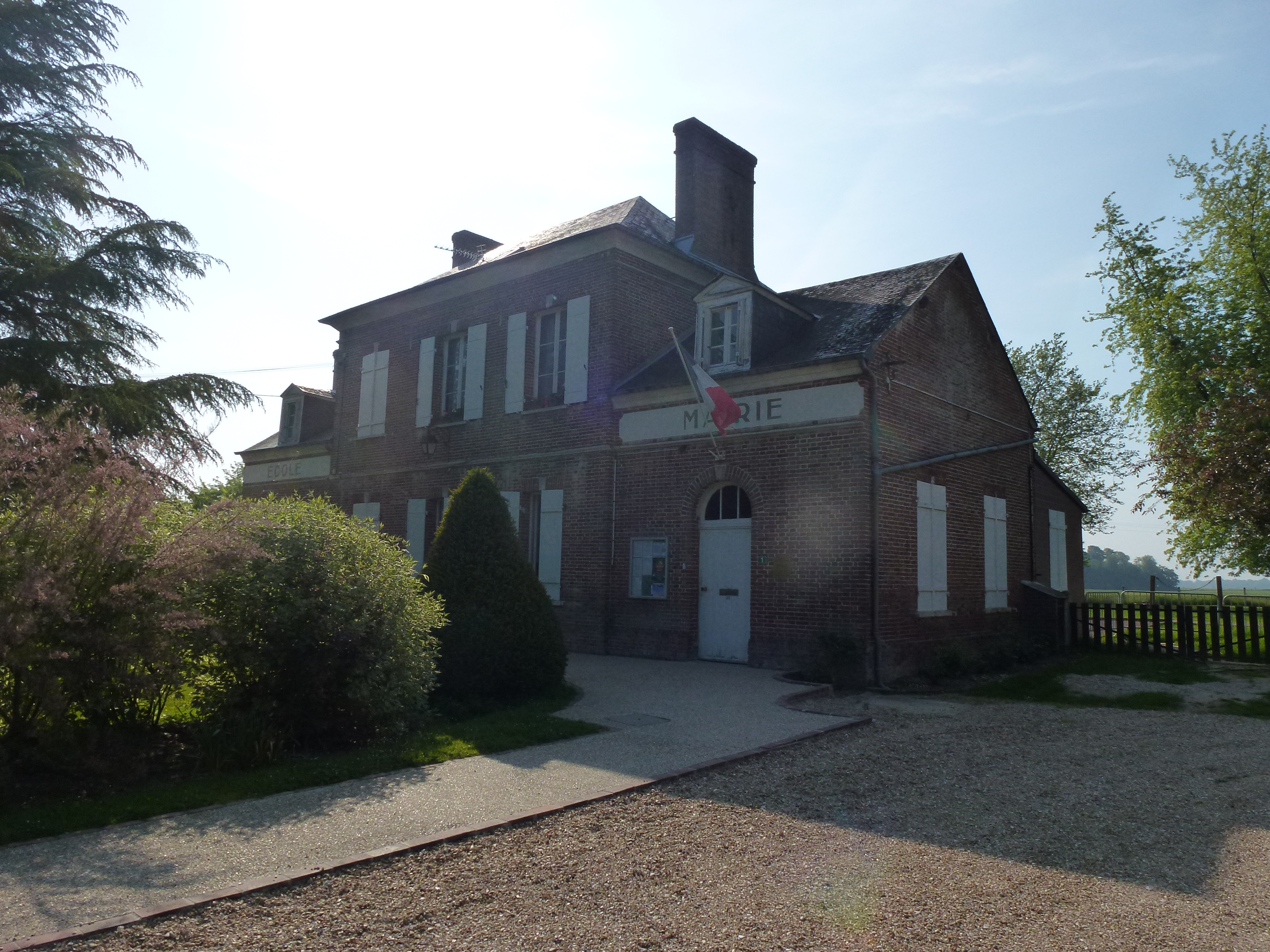
- The town hall in Graveron-Sémerville
- Location of Graveron-Sémerville
- Location within France Location within Normandy
- Coordinates: 49°05′41″N 0°58′31″E
- Country: France
- Region: Normandy
- Department: Eure
- Arrondissement: Bernay
- Canton: Le Neubourg

Government
  - Mayor (2020–2026): Claire Carrere-Godebout
- Area^{1}: 8.03 km^{2} (3.10 sq mi)
- Elevation: 140 m (460 ft)
- Highest elevation: 149 m (489 ft)
- Lowest elevation: 133 m (436 ft)
- Population (2023): 322
  - Density: 40.1/km^{2} (104/sq mi)
- Time zone: UTC+01:00 (CET)
  - Summer (DST): UTC+02:00 (CEST)
- INSEE/Postal code: 27298 /27110
- ^{1} French Land Register data, which excludes lakes, ponds, glaciers > 1 km^{2} (0.386 sq mi or 247 acres) and river estuaries.

Graveron-Sémerville (French pronunciation: [ɡʁavʁɔ̃ semɛʁvil]) is a commune in the Eure department in northern France.

== Population ==
Historical population
Year	Pop.	±% p.a.
1968	173	—
1975	158	−1.29%
1982	243	+6.34%
1990	240	−0.16%
1999	266	+1.15%
2007	292	+1.17%
2012	294	+0.14%
2017	303	+0.60%
2023	322	+1.02%
Source: INSEE

== See also ==
- Communes of the Eure department
