= Tournedos-Bois-Hubert =

- Commune
- Coat of arms
- Location of Tournedos-Bois-Hubert
- Location within France Location within Normandy
- Coordinates: 49°04′39″N 0°58′55″E
- Country: France
- Region: Normandy
- Department: Eure
- Arrondissement: Bernay
- Canton: Le Neubourg

Government
  - Mayor (2020–2026): Roger Wallart
- Area^{1}: 7.99 km^{2} (3.08 sq mi)
- Elevation: 146 m (479 ft)
- Highest elevation: 152 m (499 ft)
- Lowest elevation: 136 m (446 ft)
- Population (2023): 451
  - Density: 56.4/km^{2} (146/sq mi)
- Time zone: UTC+01:00 (CET)
  - Summer (DST): UTC+02:00 (CEST)
- INSEE/Postal code: 27650 /27180
- ^{1} French Land Register data, which excludes lakes, ponds, glaciers > 1 km^{2} (0.386 sq mi or 247 acres) and river estuaries.

Tournedos-Bois-Hubert is a commune in the Eure department in Normandy in northern France.

== Population ==
Historical population
Year	Pop.	±% p.a.
1968	113	—
1975	152	+4.33%
1982	266	+8.32%
1990	299	+1.47%
1999	301	+0.07%
2007	336	+1.38%
2012	428	+4.96%
2017	476	+2.15%
2023	451	−0.90%
Source: INSEE

== See also ==
- Communes of the Eure department
