= Le Mesnil-Fuguet =

- Commune
- Location of Le Mesnil-Fuguet
- Location within France Location within Normandy
- Coordinates: 49°04′14″N 1°06′00″E
- Country: France
- Region: Normandy
- Department: Eure
- Arrondissement: Évreux
- Canton: Le Neubourg
- Intercommunality: CA Évreux Portes de Normandie

Government
  - Mayor (2020–2026): Michel Dulondel
- Area^{1}: 3.58 km^{2} (1.38 sq mi)
- Elevation: 115 m (377 ft)
- Highest elevation: 144 m (472 ft)
- Lowest elevation: 89 m (292 ft)
- Population (2023): 200
  - Density: 56/km^{2} (140/sq mi)
- Time zone: UTC+01:00 (CET)
  - Summer (DST): UTC+02:00 (CEST)
- INSEE/Postal code: 27401 /27930
- ^{1} French Land Register data, which excludes lakes, ponds, glaciers > 1 km^{2} (0.386 sq mi or 247 acres) and river estuaries.

Le Mesnil-Fuguet (French pronunciation: [lə mɛnil fyɡɛ]) is a commune in the Eure department in Normandy in northern France.

== Population ==
Historical population
Year	Pop.	±% p.a.
1968	72	—
1975	145	+10.52%
1982	179	+3.06%
1990	195	+1.08%
1999	203	+0.45%
2007	201	−0.12%
2012	178	−2.40%
2017	171	−0.80%
2023	200	+2.65%
Source: INSEE

== See also ==
- Communes of the Eure department
