= Cesseville =

- Commune
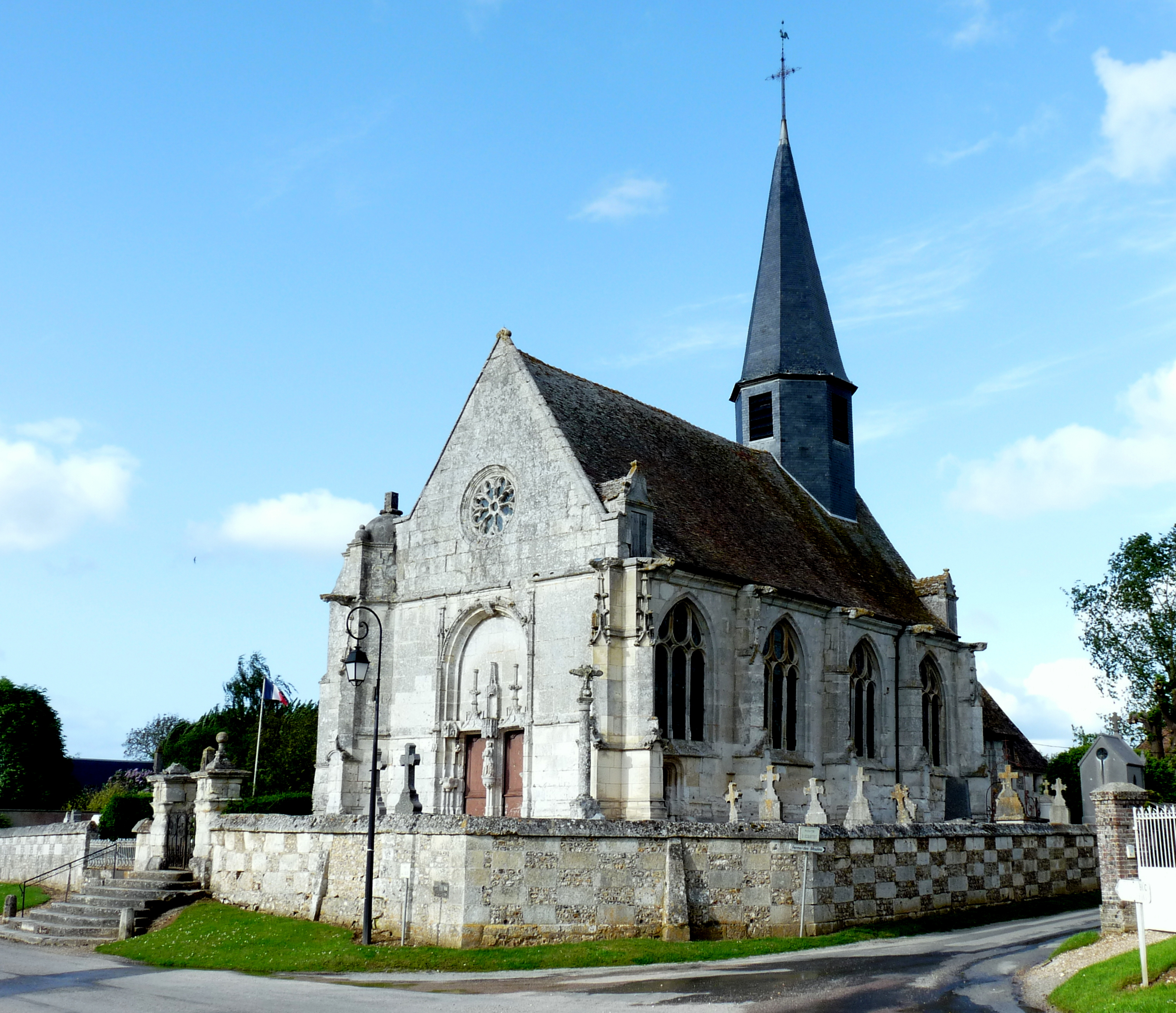
- The church in Cesseville

- Coat of arms
- Location of Cesseville
- Location within France Location within Normandy
- Coordinates: 49°10′54″N 0°58′43″E
- Country: France
- Region: Normandy
- Department: Eure
- Arrondissement: Bernay
- Canton: Le Neubourg
- Intercommunality: Pays du Neubourg

Government
  - Mayor (2020–2026): Alain Debus
- Area^{1}: 6.57 km^{2} (2.54 sq mi)
- Elevation: 155 m (509 ft)
- Highest elevation: 156 m (512 ft)
- Lowest elevation: 146 m (479 ft)
- Population (2023): 440
  - Density: 67/km^{2} (170/sq mi)
- Time zone: UTC+01:00 (CET)
  - Summer (DST): UTC+02:00 (CEST)
- INSEE/Postal code: 27135 /27110
- ^{1} French Land Register data, which excludes lakes, ponds, glaciers > 1 km^{2} (0.386 sq mi or 247 acres) and river estuaries.

Cesseville (French pronunciation: [sɛsvil]) is a commune in the Eure department in the Normandy region in northern France.

== Population ==
Historical population
Year	Pop.	±% p.a.
1968	188	—
1975	207	+1.38%
1982	252	+2.85%
1990	323	+3.15%
1999	331	+0.27%
2007	396	+2.27%
2012	452	+2.68%
2017	489	+1.59%
2023	440	−1.74%
Source: INSEE

== See also ==
- Communes of the Eure department
