= Saint-Martin-la-Campagne =

- Commune
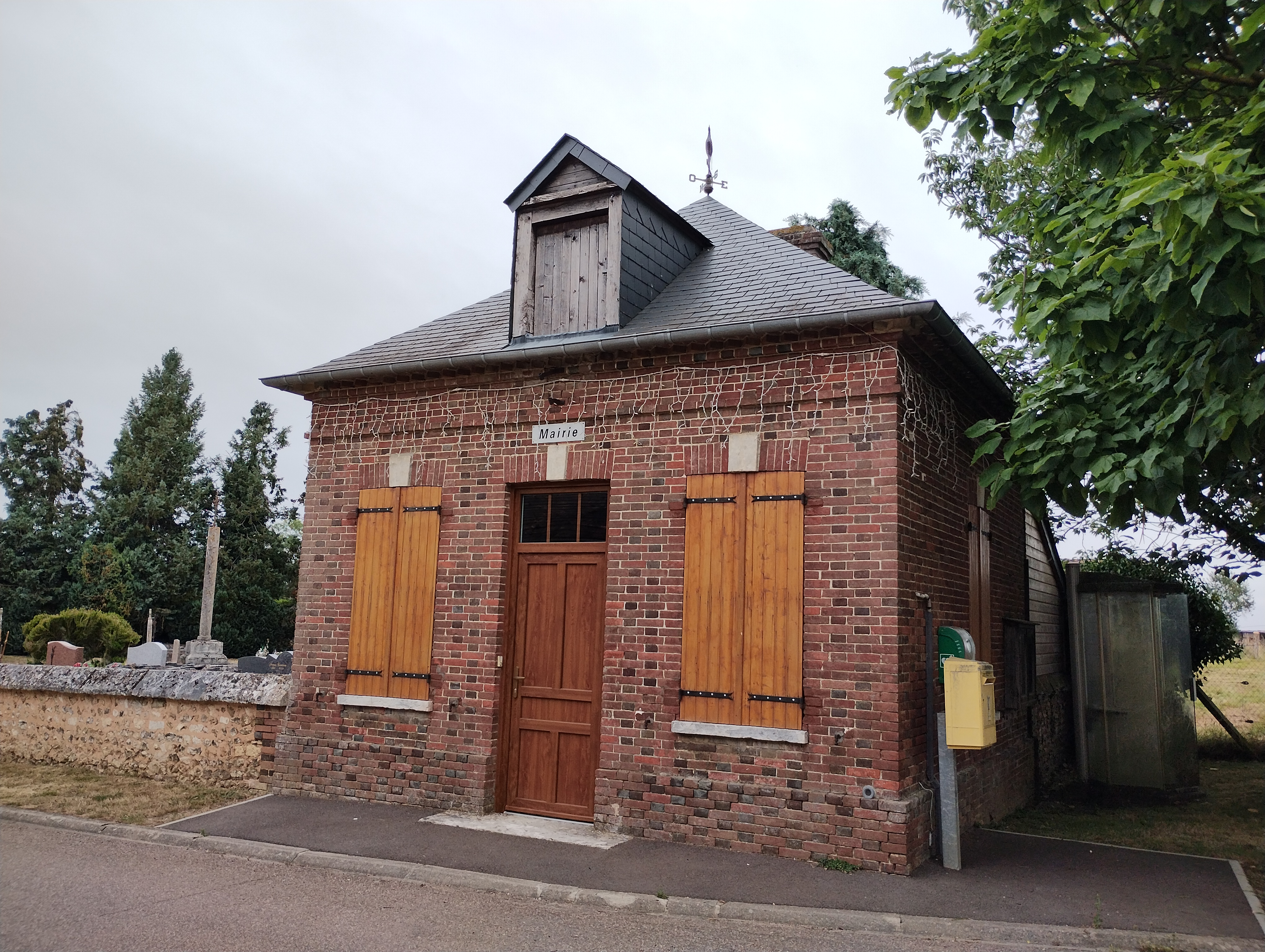
- Saint-Martin-la-Campagne Town hall
- Location of Saint-Martin-la-Campagne
- Location within France Location within Normandy
- Coordinates: 49°04′01″N 1°04′21″E
- Country: France
- Region: Normandy
- Department: Eure
- Arrondissement: Évreux
- Canton: Le Neubourg
- Intercommunality: CA Évreux Portes de Normandie

Government
  - Mayor (2020–2026): Christian De Langhe
- Area^{1}: 3.52 km^{2} (1.36 sq mi)
- Elevation: 141 m (463 ft)
- Highest elevation: 146 m (479 ft)
- Lowest elevation: 136 m (446 ft)
- Population (2023): 99
  - Density: 28/km^{2} (73/sq mi)
- Time zone: UTC+01:00 (CET)
  - Summer (DST): UTC+02:00 (CEST)
- INSEE/Postal code: 27570 /27930
- ^{1} French Land Register data, which excludes lakes, ponds, glaciers > 1 km^{2} (0.386 sq mi or 247 acres) and river estuaries.

Saint-Martin-la-Campagne is a commune in the Eure department in Normandy in northern France.

== Population ==
Historical population
Year	Pop.	±% p.a.
1968	52	—
1975	62	+2.54%
1982	75	+2.76%
1990	89	+2.16%
1999	89	+0.00%
2007	97	+1.08%
2012	104	+1.40%
2017	99	−0.98%
2023	99	+0.00%
Source: INSEE

== See also ==
- Communes of the Eure department
