= Hondouville =

- Commune
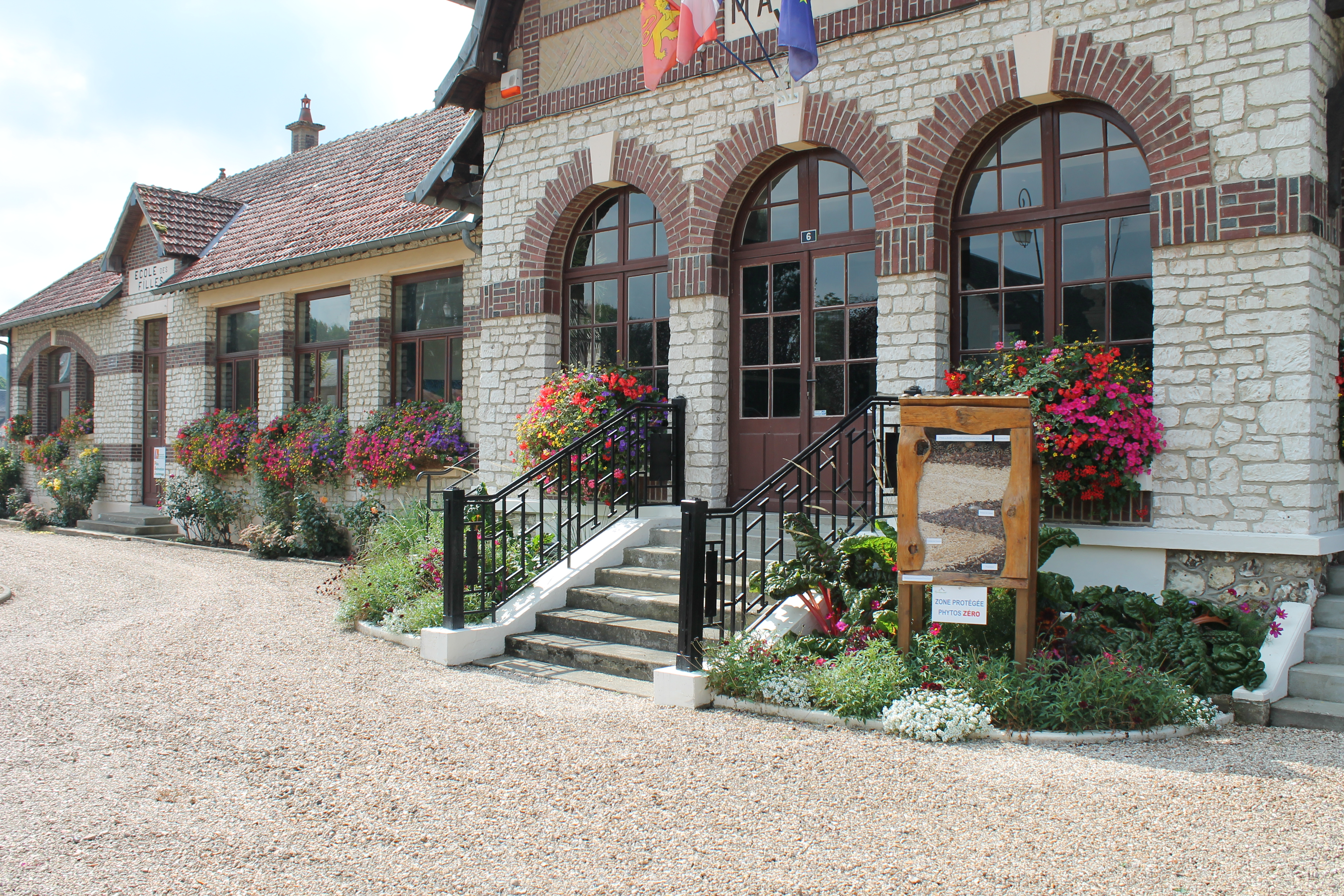
- The town hall in Hondouville

- Coat of arms
- Location of Hondouville
- Location within France Location within Normandy
- Coordinates: 49°08′24″N 1°07′09″E
- Country: France
- Region: Normandy
- Department: Eure
- Arrondissement: Bernay
- Canton: Le Neubourg
- Intercommunality: Pays du Neubourg

Government
  - Mayor (2020–2026): Jean-Charles Paris
- Area^{1}: 6.88 km^{2} (2.66 sq mi)
- Elevation: 27 m (89 ft)
- Highest elevation: 147 m (482 ft)
- Lowest elevation: 25 m (82 ft)
- Population (2023): 827
  - Density: 120/km^{2} (311/sq mi)
- Time zone: UTC+01:00 (CET)
  - Summer (DST): UTC+02:00 (CEST)
- INSEE/Postal code: 27339 /27400
- ^{1} French Land Register data, which excludes lakes, ponds, glaciers > 1 km^{2} (0.386 sq mi or 247 acres) and river estuaries.

Hondouville (French pronunciation: [ɔ̃duvil]) is a commune in the Eure department in northern France.

== Population ==
Historical population
Year	Pop.	±% p.a.
1968	452	—
1975	551	+2.87%
1982	564	+0.33%
1990	632	+1.43%
1999	721	+1.47%
2007	752	+0.53%
2012	791	+1.02%
2017	798	+0.18%
2023	827	+0.60%
Source: INSEE

== See also ==
- Communes of the Eure department
