= Iville =

- Commune
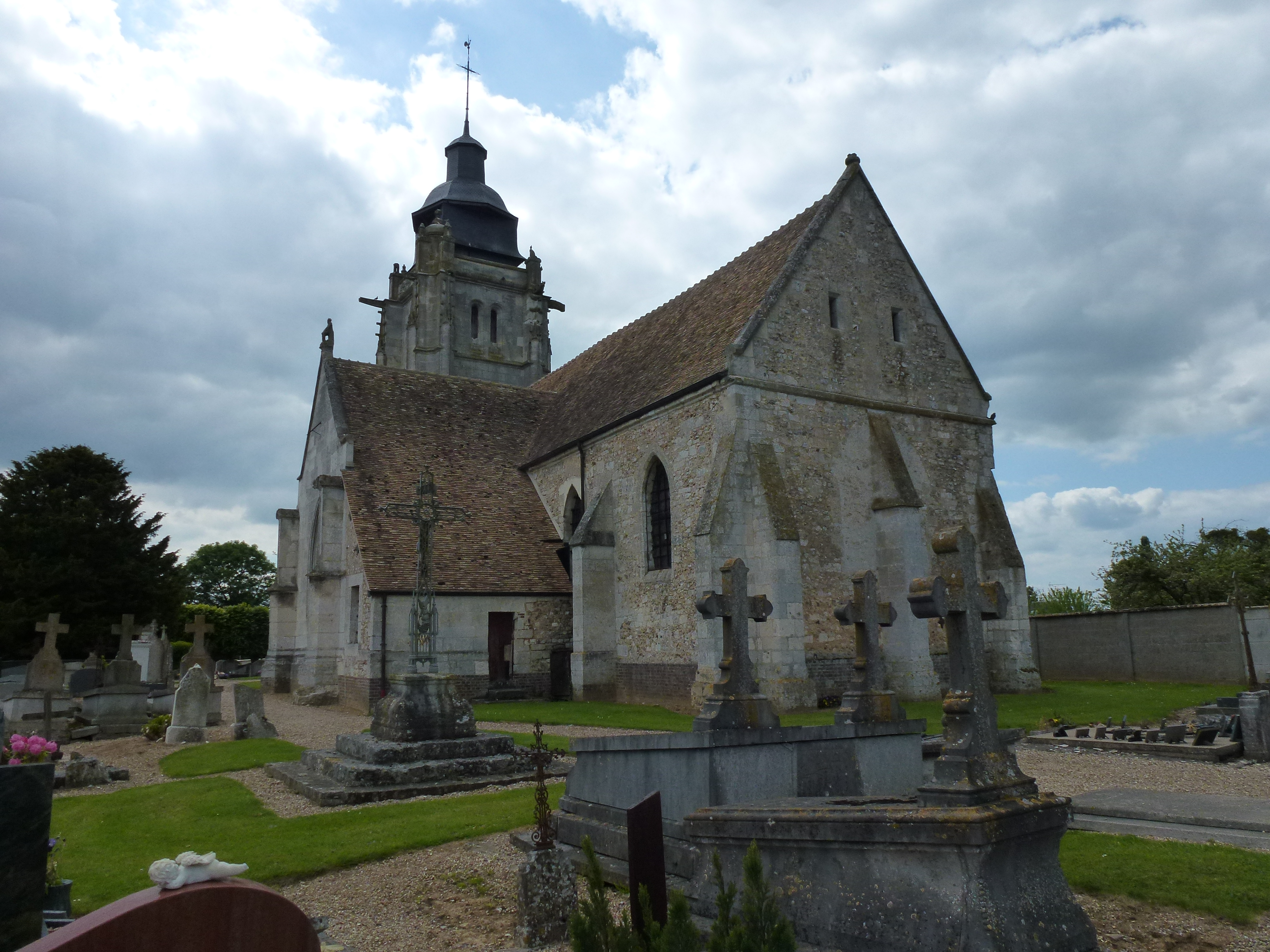
- The church of Notre-Dame in Iville

- Coat of arms
- Location of Iville
- Location within France Location within Normandy
- Coordinates: 49°10′41″N 0°55′30″E
- Country: France
- Region: Normandy
- Department: Eure
- Arrondissement: Bernay
- Canton: Le Neubourg

Government
  - Mayor (2020–2026): Jean-Paul Legendre
- Area^{1}: 8.81 km^{2} (3.40 sq mi)
- Elevation: 150 m (490 ft)
- Highest elevation: 158 m (518 ft)
- Lowest elevation: 140 m (460 ft)
- Population (2023): 426
  - Density: 48.4/km^{2} (125/sq mi)
- Time zone: UTC+01:00 (CET)
  - Summer (DST): UTC+02:00 (CEST)
- INSEE/Postal code: 27354 /27110
- ^{1} French Land Register data, which excludes lakes, ponds, glaciers > 1 km^{2} (0.386 sq mi or 247 acres) and river estuaries.

Iville (French pronunciation: [ivil]) is a commune in the Eure department in northern France.

== Population ==
Historical population
Year	Pop.	±% p.a.
1968	314	—
1975	335	+0.93%
1982	328	−0.30%
1990	410	+2.83%
1999	401	−0.25%
2007	459	+1.70%
2012	488	+1.23%
2017	464	−1.00%
2023	426	−1.41%
Source: INSEE

== See also ==
- Communes of the Eure department
