= Houetteville =

- Commune
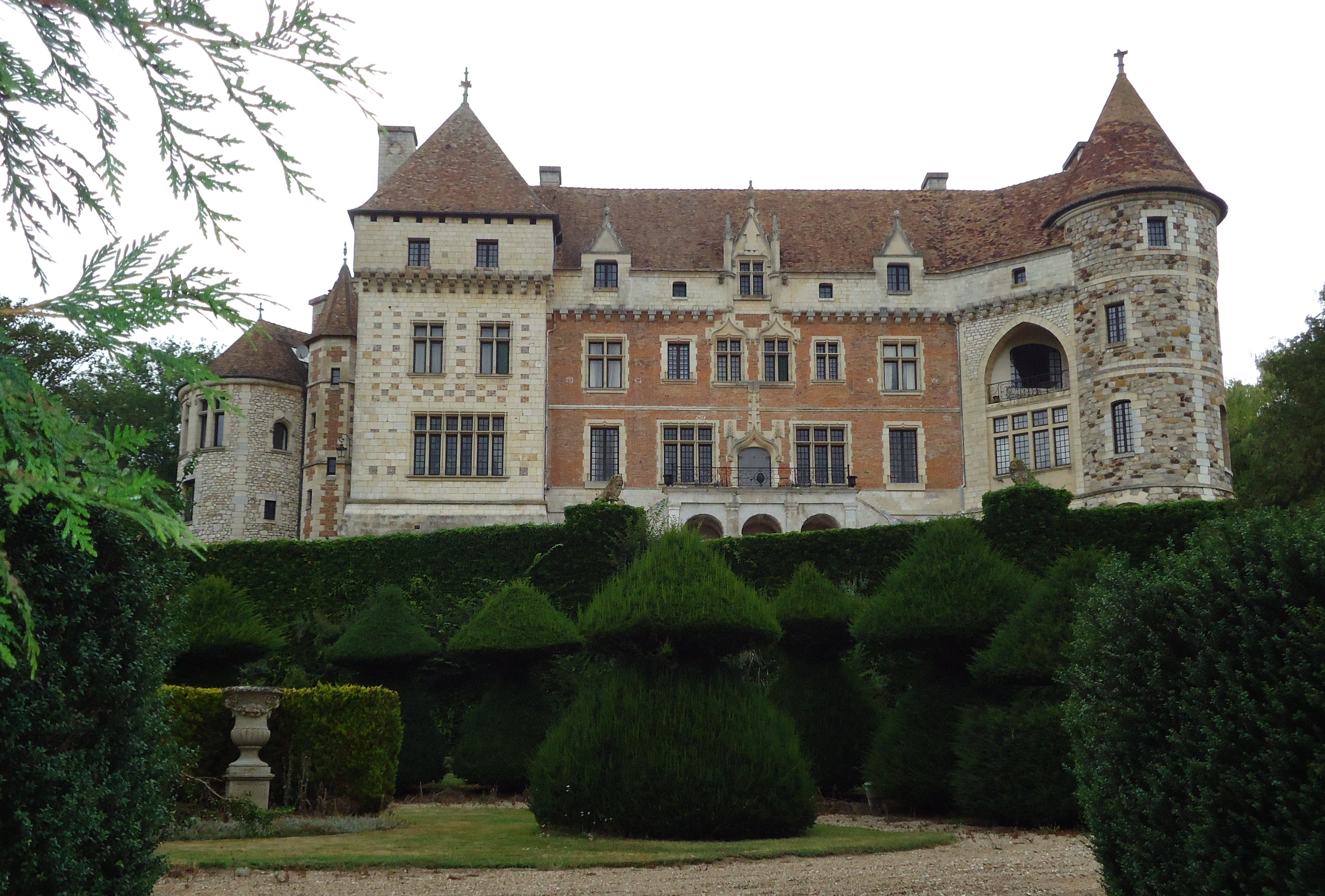
- The chateau in Houetteville
- Location of Houetteville
- Location within France Location within Normandy
- Coordinates: 49°07′39″N 1°06′39″E
- Country: France
- Region: Normandy
- Department: Eure
- Arrondissement: Évreux
- Canton: Le Neubourg
- Intercommunality: CC du Pays du Neubourg

Government
  - Mayor (2020–2026): Martine Saint-Laurent
- Area^{1}: 6.85 km^{2} (2.64 sq mi)
- Elevation: 140 m (460 ft)
- Highest elevation: 144 m (472 ft)
- Lowest elevation: 30 m (98 ft)
- Population (2023): 193
  - Density: 28.2/km^{2} (73.0/sq mi)
- Time zone: UTC+01:00 (CET)
  - Summer (DST): UTC+02:00 (CEST)
- INSEE/Postal code: 27342 /27400
- ^{1} French Land Register data, which excludes lakes, ponds, glaciers > 1 km^{2} (0.386 sq mi or 247 acres) and river estuaries.

Houetteville (French pronunciation: [wɛtvil]) is a commune in the Eure department and Normandy region of northern France.

== Population ==
Historical population
Year	Pop.	±% p.a.
1968	155	—
1975	156	+0.09%
1982	165	+0.80%
1990	173	+0.59%
1999	198	+1.51%
2007	216	+1.09%
2012	213	−0.28%
2017	205	−0.76%
2023	193	−1.00%
Source: INSEE

== See also ==
- Communes of the Eure department
