= Crestot =

- Commune
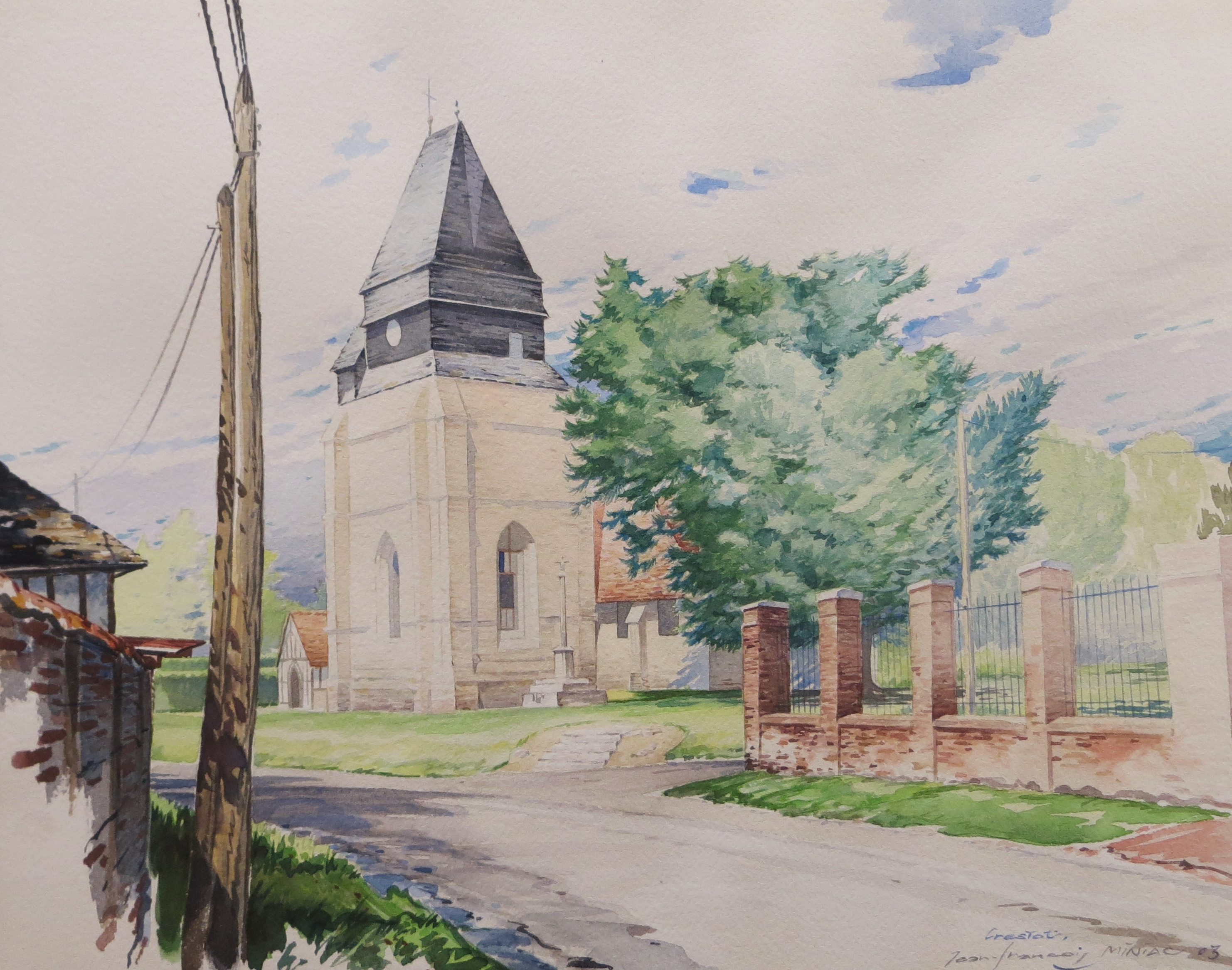
- The church in Crestot
- Location of Crestot
- Location within France Location within Normandy
- Coordinates: 49°12′20″N 0°58′20″E
- Country: France
- Region: Normandy
- Department: Eure
- Arrondissement: Bernay
- Canton: Le Neubourg

Government
  - Mayor (2020–2026): Christine Louis
- Area^{1}: 6.31 km^{2} (2.44 sq mi)
- Elevation: 159 m (522 ft)
- Highest elevation: 160 m (520 ft)
- Lowest elevation: 145 m (476 ft)
- Population (2023): 544
  - Density: 86.2/km^{2} (223/sq mi)
- Time zone: UTC+01:00 (CET)
  - Summer (DST): UTC+02:00 (CEST)
- INSEE/Postal code: 27185 /27110
- ^{1} French Land Register data, which excludes lakes, ponds, glaciers > 1 km^{2} (0.386 sq mi or 247 acres) and river estuaries.

Crestot is a commune in the Eure department in northern France.

== Population ==
Historical population
Year	Pop.	±% p.a.
1968	189	—
1975	233	+3.04%
1982	259	+1.52%
1990	304	+2.02%
1999	294	−0.37%
2007	383	+3.36%
2012	451	+3.32%
2017	565	+4.61%
2023	544	−0.63%
Source: INSEE

== See also ==
- Communes of the Eure department
