= Villettes =

- Commune
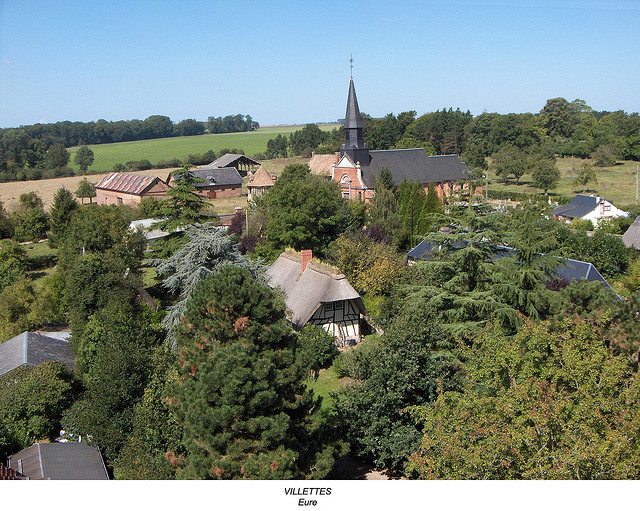
- A general view of Villettes
- Location of Villettes
- Location within France Location within Normandy
- Coordinates: 49°08′59″N 1°02′45″E
- Country: France
- Region: Normandy
- Department: Eure
- Arrondissement: Bernay
- Canton: Le Neubourg

Government
  - Mayor (2024–2026): Arlette Robache
- Area^{1}: 6.87 km^{2} (2.65 sq mi)
- Elevation: 154 m (505 ft)
- Highest elevation: 152 m (499 ft)
- Lowest elevation: 70 m (230 ft)
- Population (2023): 169
  - Density: 24.6/km^{2} (63.7/sq mi)
- Time zone: UTC+01:00 (CET)
  - Summer (DST): UTC+02:00 (CEST)
- INSEE/Postal code: 27692 /27110
- ^{1} French Land Register data, which excludes lakes, ponds, glaciers > 1 km^{2} (0.386 sq mi or 247 acres) and river estuaries.

Villettes (French pronunciation: [vilɛt]) is a commune in the Eure department in Normandy in northern France.

== Population ==
Historical population
Year	Pop.	±% p.a.
1968	101	—
1975	82	−2.93%
1982	91	+1.50%
1990	124	+3.94%
1999	125	+0.09%
2007	170	+3.92%
2012	178	+0.92%
2017	170	−0.92%
2023	169	−0.10%
Source: INSEE

== See also ==
- Communes of the Eure department
