= Mandeville, Eure =

Mandeville
- Commune
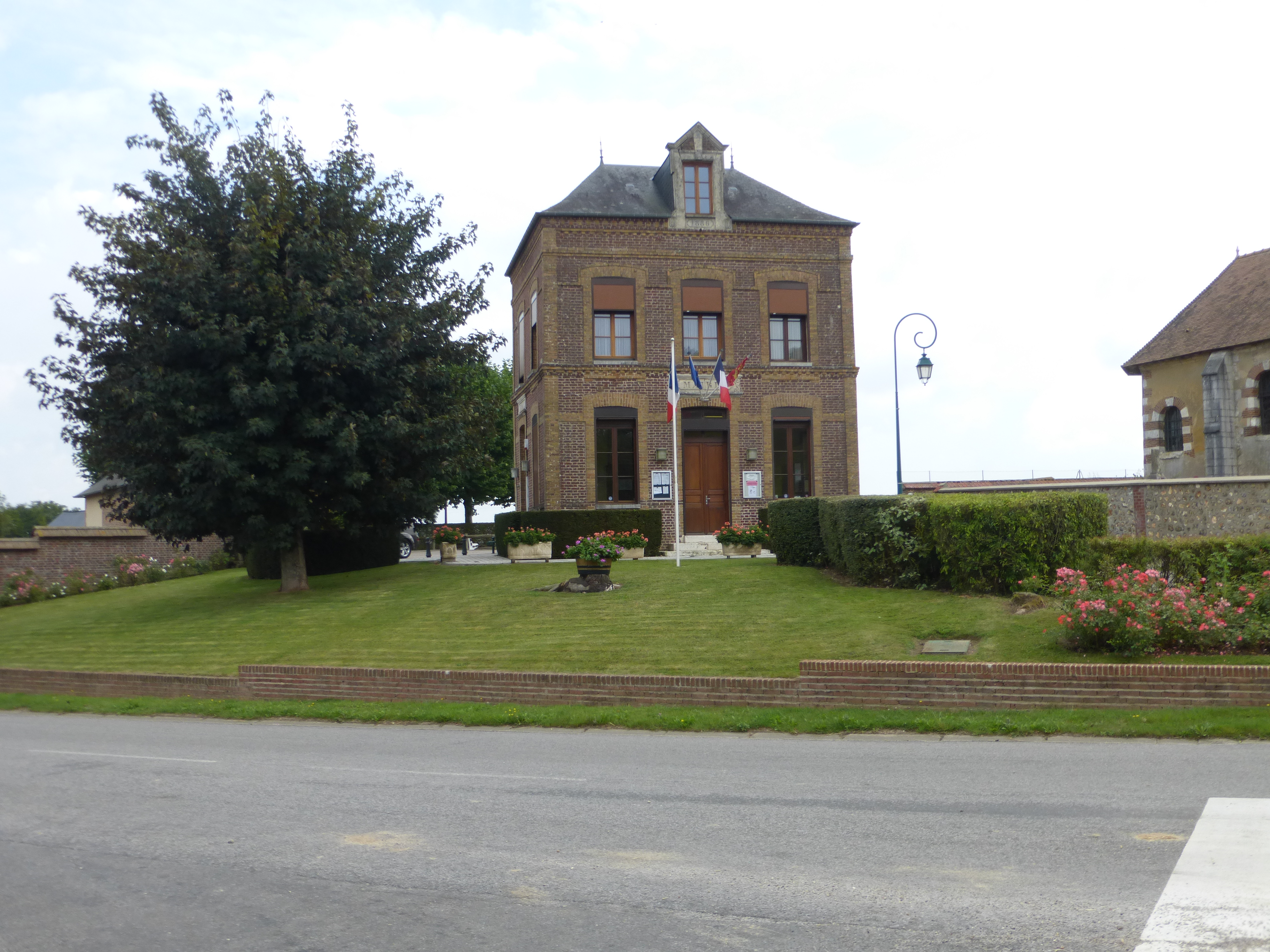
- The town hall in Mandeville

- Coat of arms
- Location of Mandeville
- Location within France Location within Normandy
- Coordinates: 49°13′22″N 1°00′49″E
- Country: France
- Region: Normandy
- Department: Eure
- Arrondissement: Bernay
- Canton: Le Neubourg
- Intercommunality: CA Seine-Eure

Government
  - Mayor (2020–2026): Dominique Medaerts
- Area^{1}: 3.05 km^{2} (1.18 sq mi)
- Elevation: 178 m (584 ft)
- Highest elevation: 162 m (531 ft)
- Lowest elevation: 127 m (417 ft)
- Population (2023): 356
  - Density: 117/km^{2} (302/sq mi)
- Time zone: UTC+01:00 (CET)
  - Summer (DST): UTC+02:00 (CEST)
- INSEE/Postal code: 27382 /27370
- ^{1} French Land Register data, which excludes lakes, ponds, glaciers > 1 km^{2} (0.386 sq mi or 247 acres) and river estuaries.

Mandeville (French pronunciation: [mɑ̃dvil]) is a commune in the Eure department in Normandy in northern France.

== Population ==
Historical population
Year	Pop.	±% p.a.
1968	94	—
1975	112	+2.53%
1982	245	+11.83%
1990	258	+0.65%
1999	235	−1.03%
2007	296	+2.93%
2012	317	+1.38%
2017	318	+0.06%
2023	356	+1.90%
Source: INSEE

== See also ==
- Communes of the Eure department
