= Villez-sur-le-Neubourg =

- Commune
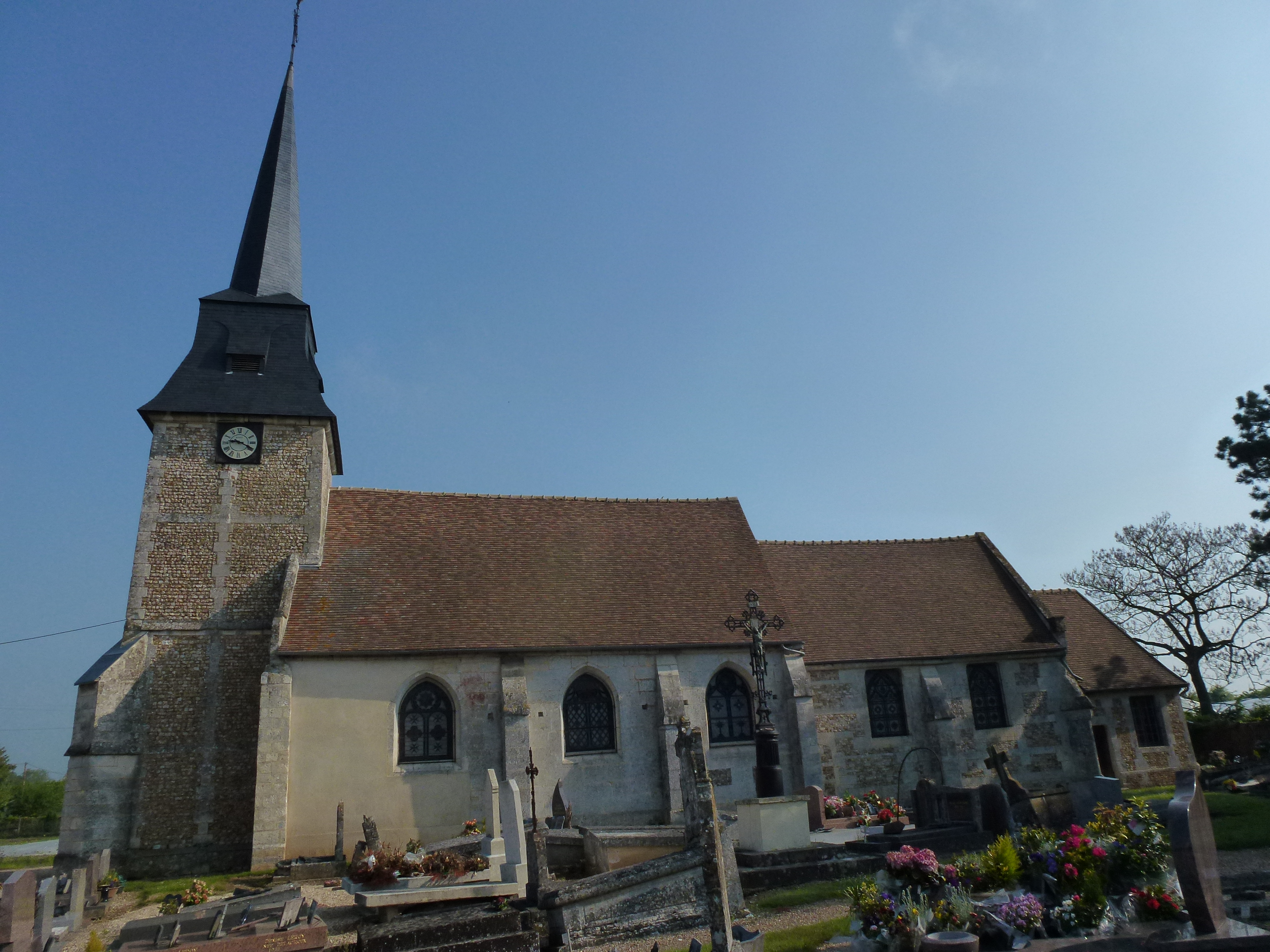
- The church in Villez-sur-le-Neubourg
- Location of Villez-sur-le-Neubourg
- Location within France Location within Normandy
- Coordinates: 49°09′11″N 0°51′37″E
- Country: France
- Region: Normandy
- Department: Eure
- Arrondissement: Bernay
- Canton: Le Neubourg

Government
  - Mayor (2020–2026): Gérard Plessis
- Area^{1}: 4.82 km^{2} (1.86 sq mi)
- Elevation: 145 m (476 ft)
- Highest elevation: 147 m (482 ft)
- Lowest elevation: 110 m (360 ft)
- Population (2023): 225
  - Density: 46.7/km^{2} (121/sq mi)
- Time zone: UTC+01:00 (CET)
  - Summer (DST): UTC+02:00 (CEST)
- INSEE/Postal code: 27695 /27110
- ^{1} French Land Register data, which excludes lakes, ponds, glaciers > 1 km^{2} (0.386 sq mi or 247 acres) and river estuaries.

Villez-sur-le-Neubourg (French pronunciation: [vile syʁ lə nøbuʁ], literally Villez on Le Neubourg) is a commune in Eure, a department in Normandy in northern France.

== Population ==
Historical population
Year	Pop.	±% p.a.
1968	178	—
1975	178	+0.00%
1982	199	+1.61%
1990	216	+1.03%
1999	239	+1.13%
2007	283	+2.13%
2012	271	−0.86%
2017	284	+0.94%
2023	225	−3.81%
Source: INSEE

== See also ==
- Communes of the Eure department
