= Criquebeuf-la-Campagne =

- Commune
- Coat of arms
- Location of Criquebeuf-la-Campagne
- Location within France Location within Normandy
- Coordinates: 49°12′09″N 1°00′11″E
- Country: France
- Region: Normandy
- Department: Eure
- Arrondissement: Bernay
- Canton: Le Neubourg

Government
  - Mayor (2020–2026): Michèle Marie
- Area^{1}: 7.75 km^{2} (2.99 sq mi)
- Elevation: 169 m (554 ft)
- Highest elevation: 162 m (531 ft)
- Lowest elevation: 143 m (469 ft)
- Population (2023): 350
  - Density: 45/km^{2} (120/sq mi)
- Time zone: UTC+01:00 (CET)
  - Summer (DST): UTC+02:00 (CEST)
- INSEE/Postal code: 27187 /27110
- ^{1} French Land Register data, which excludes lakes, ponds, glaciers > 1 km^{2} (0.386 sq mi or 247 acres) and river estuaries.

Criquebeuf-la-Campagne (French pronunciation: [kʁikbœf la kɑ̃paɲ]) is a commune in the Eure department in northern France.

== Population ==
Historical population
Year	Pop.	±% p.a.
1968	191	—
1975	200	+0.66%
1982	193	−0.51%
1990	201	+0.51%
1999	192	−0.51%
2007	208	+1.01%
2012	263	+4.80%
2017	310	+3.34%
2023	350	+2.04%
Source: INSEE

== See also ==
- Communes of the Eure department
