= Venon, Eure =

Venon
- Commune
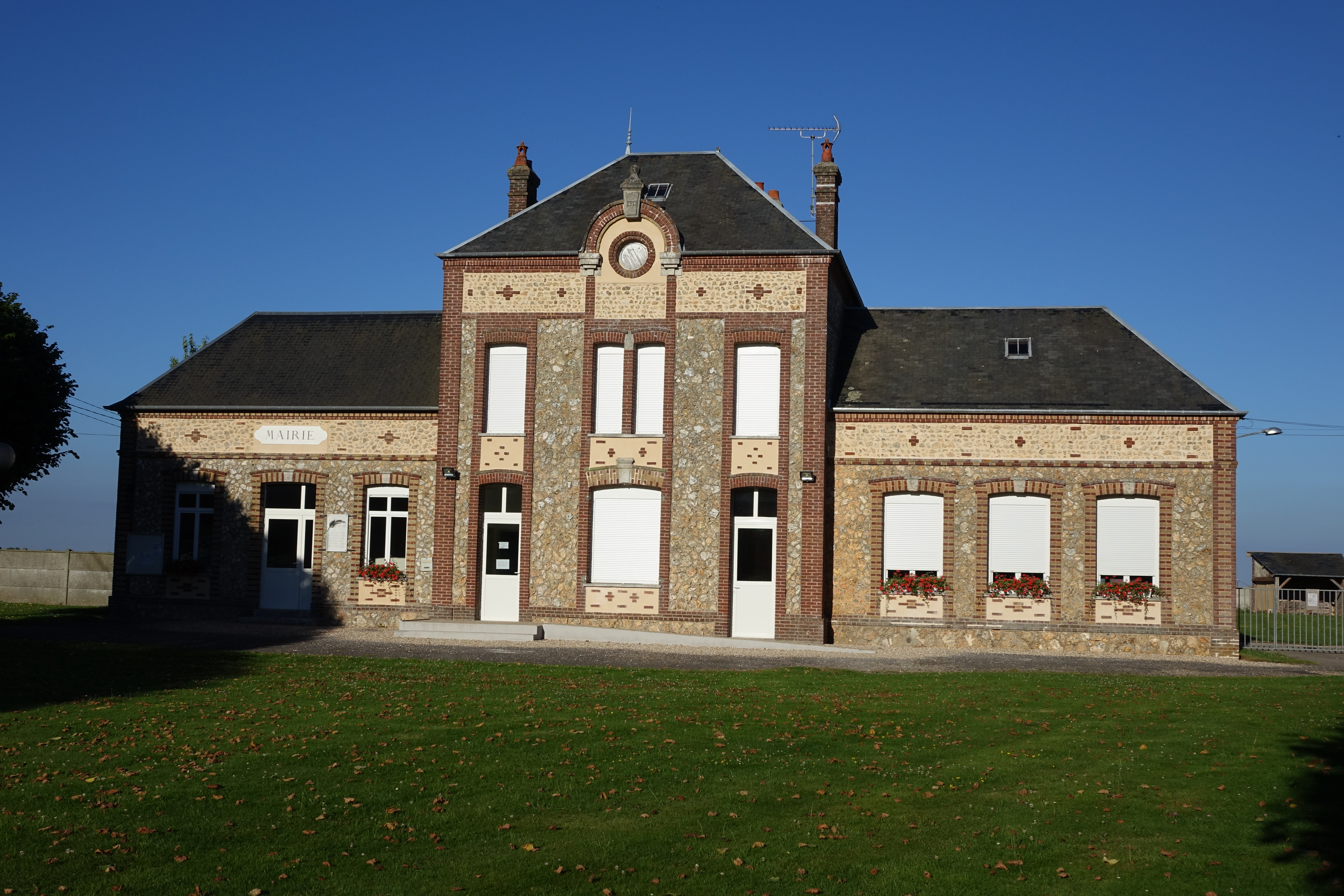
- The town hall in Venon
- Location of Venon
- Location within France Location within Normandy
- Coordinates: 49°10′25″N 1°02′59″E
- Country: France
- Region: Normandy
- Department: Eure
- Arrondissement: Bernay
- Canton: Le Neubourg

Government
  - Mayor (2020–2026): Philippe Picard
- Area^{1}: 5.07 km^{2} (1.96 sq mi)
- Elevation: 160 m (520 ft)
- Highest elevation: 158 m (518 ft)
- Lowest elevation: 113 m (371 ft)
- Population (2023): 389
  - Density: 76.7/km^{2} (199/sq mi)
- Time zone: UTC+01:00 (CET)
  - Summer (DST): UTC+02:00 (CEST)
- INSEE/Postal code: 27677 /27110
- ^{1} French Land Register data, which excludes lakes, ponds, glaciers > 1 km^{2} (0.386 sq mi or 247 acres) and river estuaries.

Venon (French pronunciation: [vənɔ̃]) is a commune in the Eure department in Normandy in northern France.

== Population ==
Historical population
Year	Pop.	±% p.a.
1968	148	—
1975	193	+3.87%
1982	254	+4.00%
1990	260	+0.29%
1999	276	+0.67%
2007	276	+0.00%
2012	365	+5.75%
2017	395	+1.59%
2023	389	−0.25%
Source: INSEE

== See also ==
- Communes of the Eure department
