= Bacquepuis =

- Commune
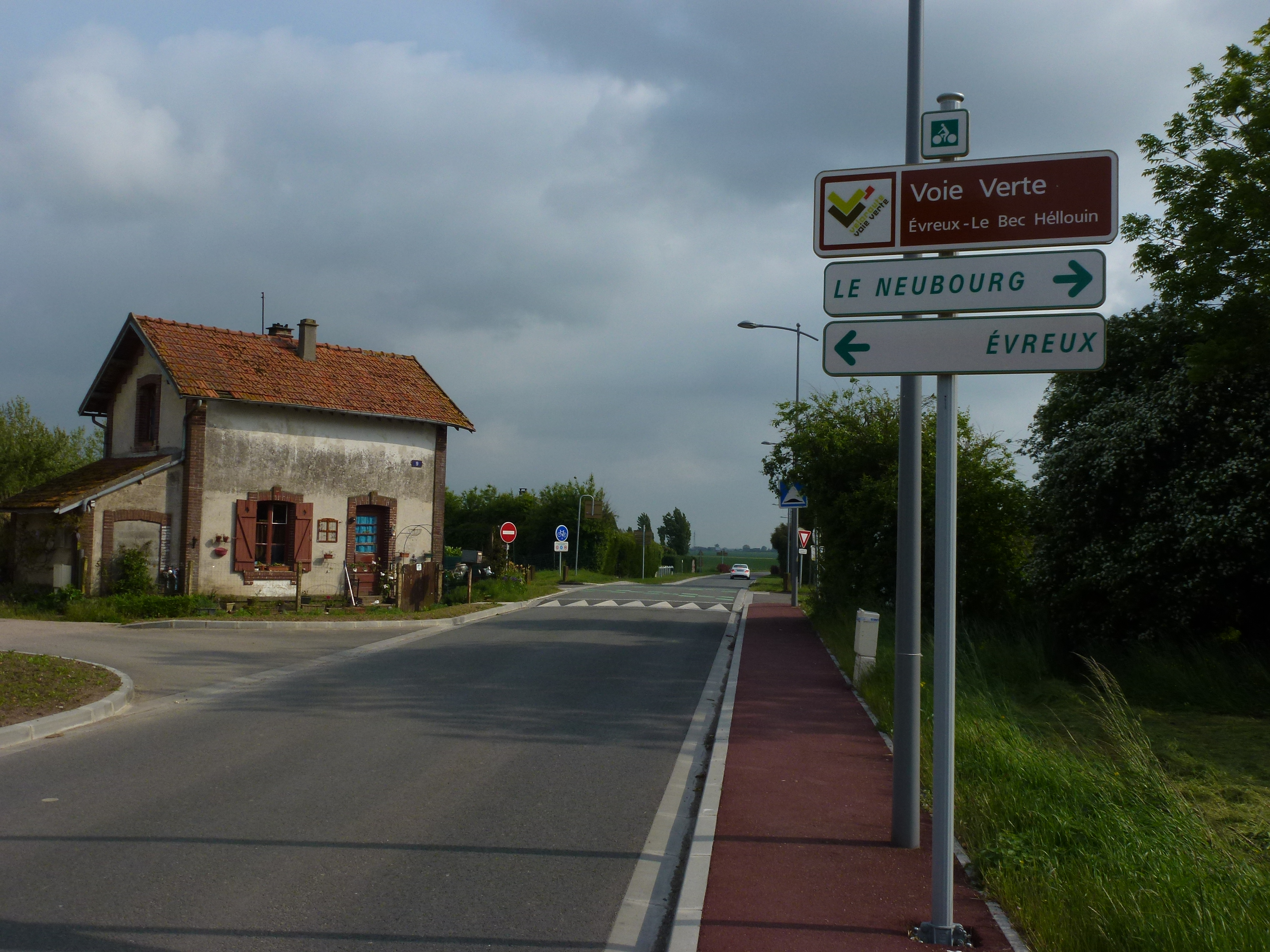
- The Évreux-Vallée du Bec greenway
- Location of Bacquepuis
- Location within France Location within Normandy
- Coordinates: 49°05′33″N 1°02′54″E
- Country: France
- Region: Normandy
- Department: Eure
- Arrondissement: Bernay
- Canton: Le Neubourg
- Intercommunality: Pays du Neubourg

Government
  - Mayor (2020–2026): William Hurel
- Area^{1}: 5.09 km^{2} (1.97 sq mi)
- Elevation: 168 m (551 ft)
- Highest elevation: 149 m (489 ft)
- Lowest elevation: 129 m (423 ft)
- Population (2023): 307
  - Density: 60.3/km^{2} (156/sq mi)
- Time zone: UTC+01:00 (CET)
  - Summer (DST): UTC+02:00 (CEST)
- INSEE/Postal code: 27033 /27930
- ^{1} French Land Register data, which excludes lakes, ponds, glaciers > 1 km^{2} (0.386 sq mi or 247 acres) and river estuaries.

Bacquepuis (French pronunciation: [bakpɥi]) is a commune in the Eure department in Normandy in northern France.

== Population ==
Historical population
Year	Pop.	±% p.a.
1968	191	—
1975	180	−0.84%
1982	252	+4.92%
1990	291	+1.81%
1999	295	+0.15%
2007	328	+1.33%
2012	324	−0.25%
2017	313	−0.69%
2023	307	−0.32%
Source: INSEE

== See also ==
- Communes of the Eure department
