= La Pyle =

- Commune
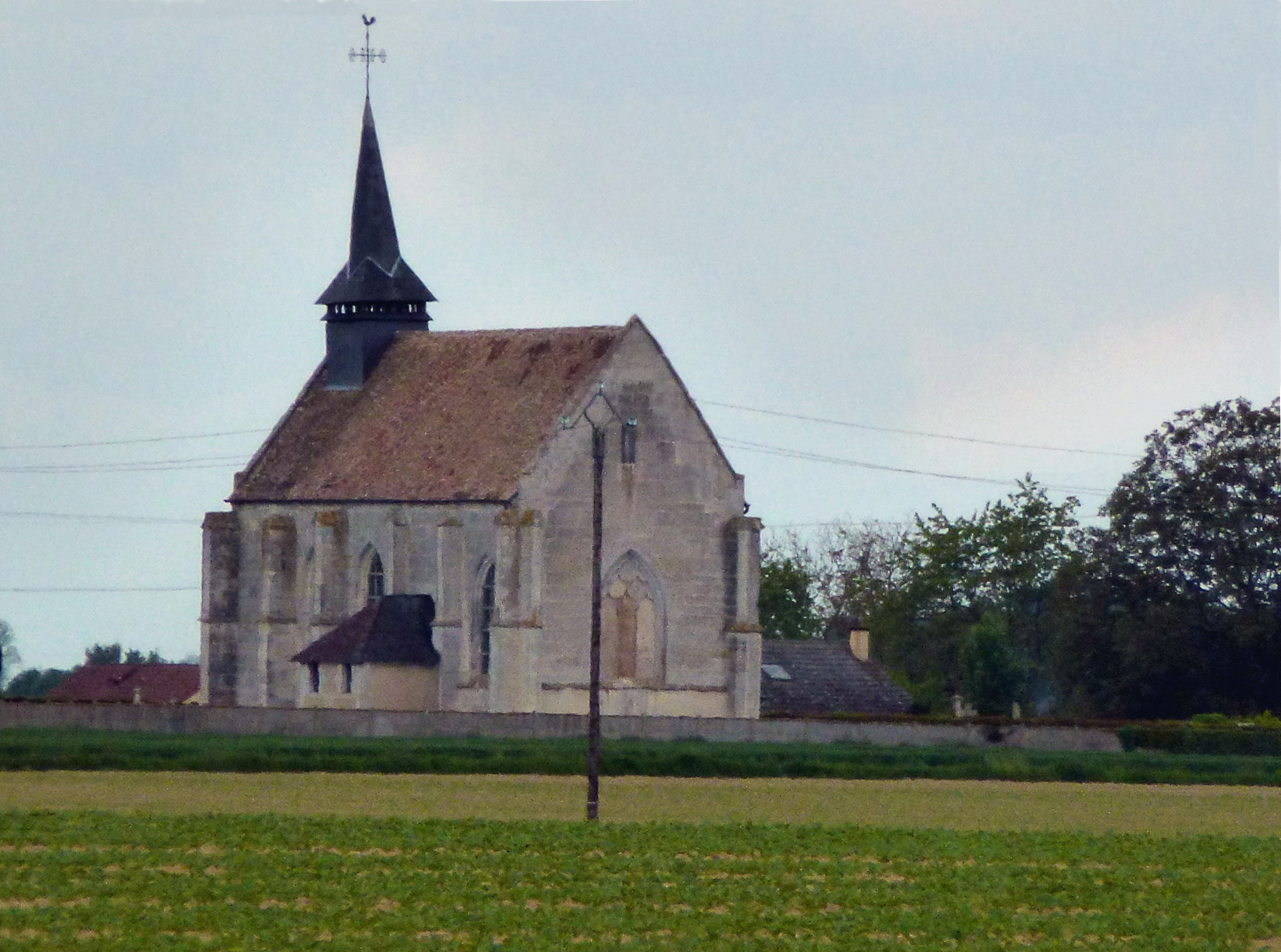
- The church in La Pyle
- Location of La Pyle
- Location within France Location within Normandy
- Coordinates: 49°12′00″N 0°53′42″E
- Country: France
- Region: Normandy
- Department: Eure
- Arrondissement: Bernay
- Canton: Le Neubourg

Government
  - Mayor (2020–2026): Gérard Pilette
- Area^{1}: 1.69 km^{2} (0.65 sq mi)
- Elevation: 160 m (520 ft)
- Highest elevation: 157 m (515 ft)
- Lowest elevation: 139 m (456 ft)
- Population (2023): 151
  - Density: 89.3/km^{2} (231/sq mi)
- Time zone: UTC+01:00 (CET)
  - Summer (DST): UTC+02:00 (CEST)
- INSEE/Postal code: 27482 /27370
- ^{1} French Land Register data, which excludes lakes, ponds, glaciers > 1 km^{2} (0.386 sq mi or 247 acres) and river estuaries.

La Pyle (French pronunciation: [la pil]) is a commune in the Eure department in Normandy in northern France.

== Population ==
Historical population
Year	Pop.	±% p.a.
1968	79	—
1975	74	−0.93%
1982	118	+6.89%
1990	141	+2.25%
1999	115	−2.24%
2007	161	+4.30%
2012	155	−0.76%
2017	156	+0.13%
2023	151	−0.54%
Source: INSEE

== See also ==
- Communes of the Eure department
