= Tourneville =

- Commune
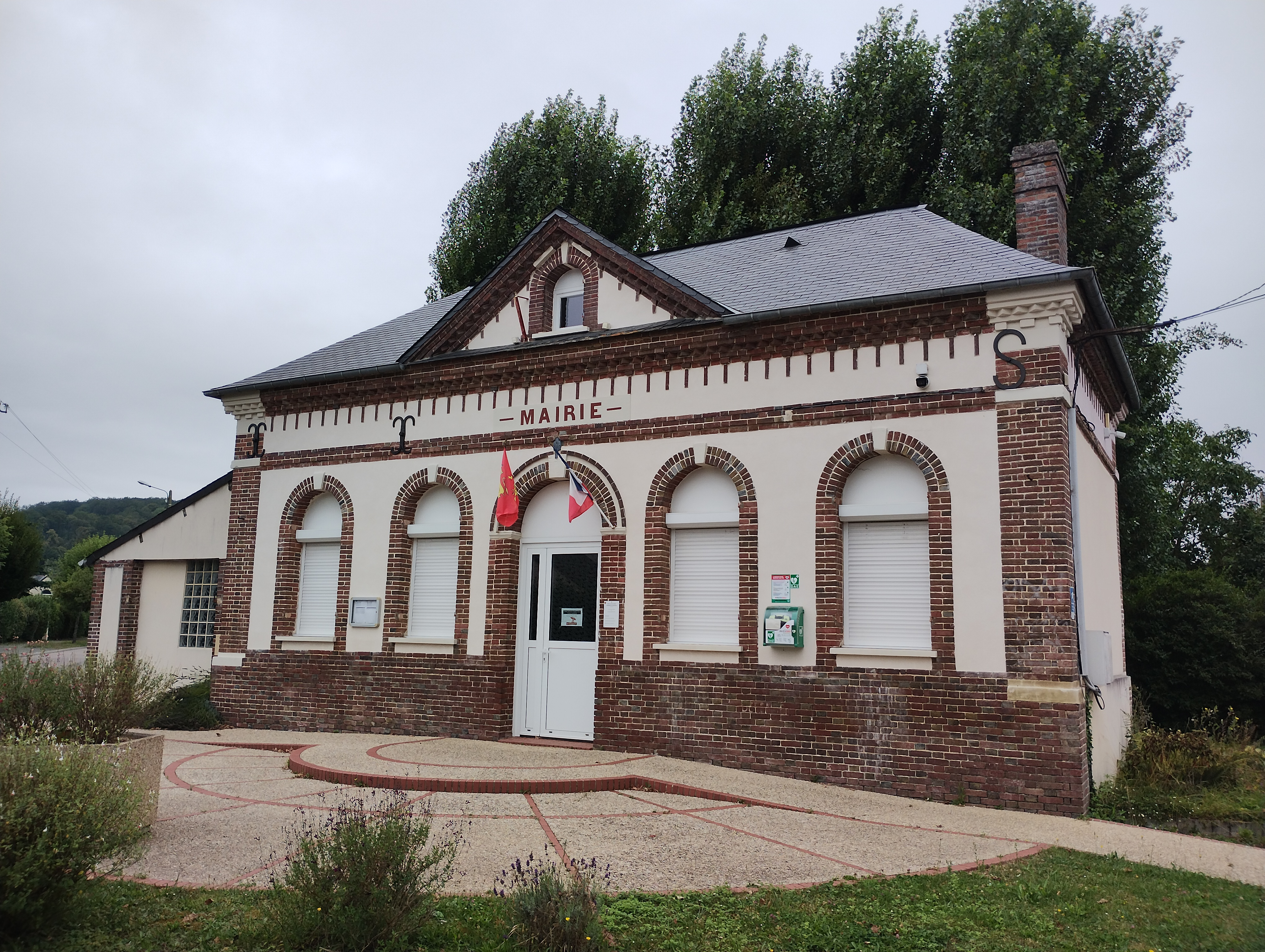
- Tourneville Town hall
- Location of Tourneville
- Location within France Location within Normandy
- Coordinates: 49°05′50″N 1°06′52″E
- Country: France
- Region: Normandy
- Department: Eure
- Arrondissement: Évreux
- Canton: Le Neubourg
- Intercommunality: CA Évreux Portes de Normandie

Government
  - Mayor (2020–2026): Cédric Roussel
- Area^{1}: 7.31 km^{2} (2.82 sq mi)
- Elevation: 42 m (138 ft)
- Highest elevation: 143 m (469 ft)
- Lowest elevation: 37 m (121 ft)
- Population (2023): 333
  - Density: 45.6/km^{2} (118/sq mi)
- Time zone: UTC+01:00 (CET)
  - Summer (DST): UTC+02:00 (CEST)
- INSEE/Postal code: 27652 /27930
- ^{1} French Land Register data, which excludes lakes, ponds, glaciers > 1 km^{2} (0.386 sq mi or 247 acres) and river estuaries.

Tourneville (French pronunciation: [tuʁnəvil]) is a commune in the Eure department in Normandy in northern France.

== Population ==
Historical population
Year	Pop.	±% p.a.
1968	118	—
1975	104	−1.79%
1982	153	+5.67%
1990	228	+5.11%
1999	258	+1.38%
2007	333	+3.24%
2012	341	+0.48%
2017	319	−1.32%
2023	333	+0.72%
Source: INSEE

== See also ==
- Communes of the Eure department
