= Ecquetot =

- Commune
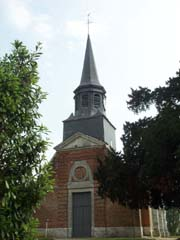
- The church in Ecquetot
- Location of Ecquetot
- Location within France Location within Normandy
- Coordinates: 49°10′10″N 1°00′43″E
- Country: France
- Region: Normandy
- Department: Eure
- Arrondissement: Bernay
- Canton: Le Neubourg

Government
  - Mayor (2020–2026): Didier Loncke
- Area^{1}: 5.74 km^{2} (2.22 sq mi)
- Elevation: 157 m (515 ft)
- Highest elevation: 153 m (502 ft)
- Lowest elevation: 133 m (436 ft)
- Population (2023): 388
  - Density: 67.6/km^{2} (175/sq mi)
- Time zone: UTC+01:00 (CET)
  - Summer (DST): UTC+02:00 (CEST)
- INSEE/Postal code: 27215 /27110
- ^{1} French Land Register data, which excludes lakes, ponds, glaciers > 1 km^{2} (0.386 sq mi or 247 acres) and river estuaries.

Ecquetot (French pronunciation: [ɛkto]) is a commune in the Eure department in northern France.

== Population ==
Historical population
Year	Pop.	±% p.a.
1968	158	—
1975	151	−0.65%
1982	215	+5.18%
1990	272	+2.98%
1999	306	+1.32%
2007	331	+0.99%
2012	375	+2.53%
2017	374	−0.05%
2023	388	+0.61%
Source: INSEE

== International relations ==
Ecquetot is twinned with:

- Cefn Cribwr in south Wales.

== See also ==
- Communes of the Eure department
