= Canappeville =

- Commune
- Coat of arms
- Location of Canappeville
- Location within France Location within Normandy
- Coordinates: 49°09′23″N 1°05′59″E
- Country: France
- Region: Normandy
- Department: Eure
- Arrondissement: Bernay
- Canton: Le Neubourg
- Intercommunality: Pays du Neubourg

Government
  - Mayor (2020–2026): Laurence Duval
- Area^{1}: 10.37 km^{2} (4.00 sq mi)
- Elevation: 158 m (518 ft)
- Highest elevation: 157 m (515 ft)
- Lowest elevation: 60 m (200 ft)
- Population (2023): 697
  - Density: 67.2/km^{2} (174/sq mi)
- Time zone: UTC+01:00 (CET)
  - Summer (DST): UTC+02:00 (CEST)
- INSEE/Postal code: 27127 /27400
- ^{1} French Land Register data, which excludes lakes, ponds, glaciers > 1 km^{2} (0.386 sq mi or 247 acres) and river estuaries.

Canappeville (French pronunciation: [kanapvil]) is a commune in the Eure department in northern France.

== Population ==
Historical population
Year	Pop.	±% p.a.
1968	367	—
1975	332	−1.42%
1982	393	+2.44%
1990	555	+4.41%
1999	564	+0.18%
2007	623	+1.25%
2012	656	+1.04%
2017	678	+0.66%
2023	697	+0.46%
Source: INSEE

== See also ==
- Communes of the Eure department
