= Le Troncq =

- Commune
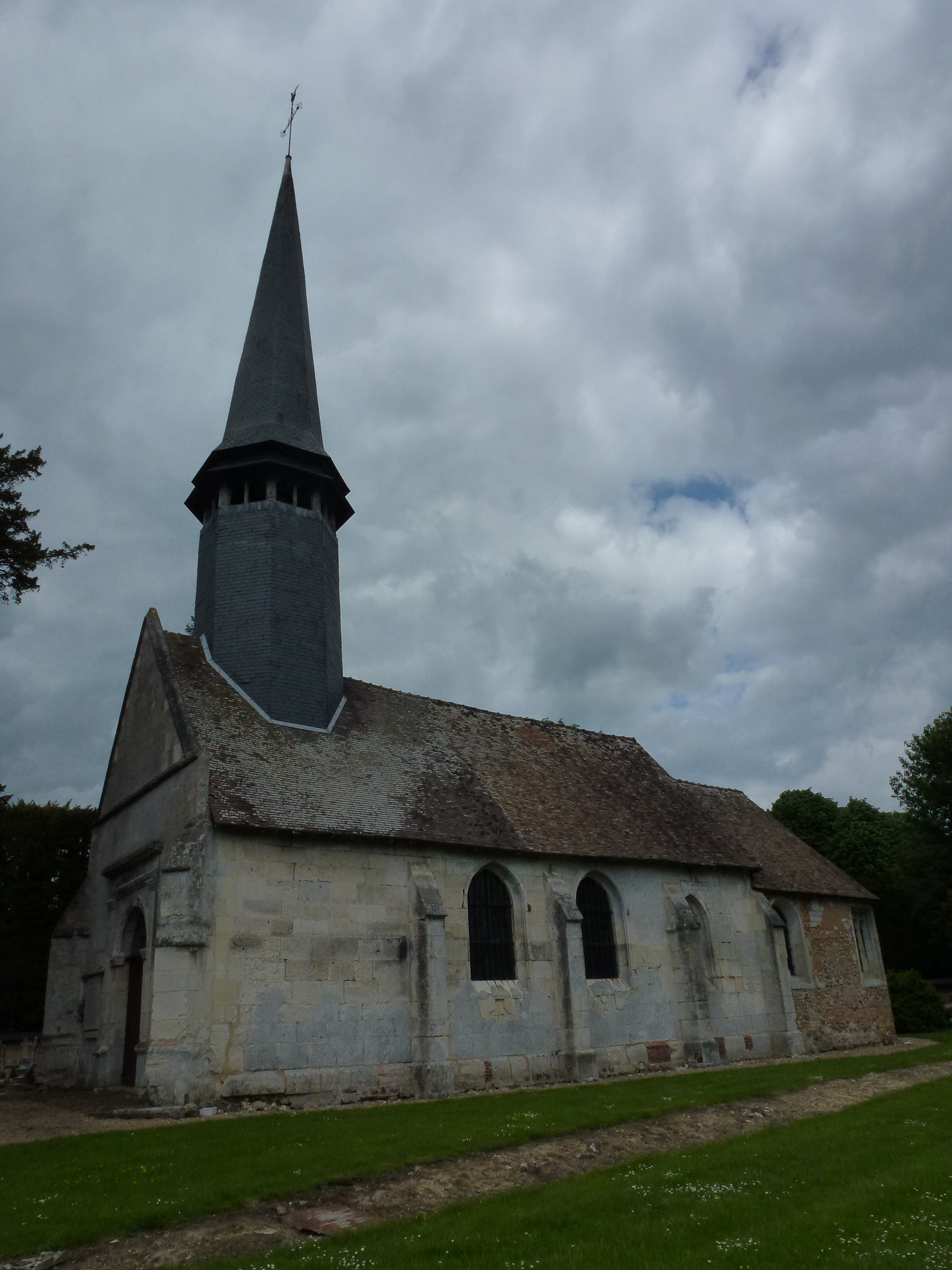
- The church in Le Troncq

- Coat of arms
- Location of Le Troncq
- Location within France Location within Normandy
- Coordinates: 49°11′38″N 0°54′49″E
- Country: France
- Region: Normandy
- Department: Eure
- Arrondissement: Bernay
- Canton: Le Neubourg

Government
  - Mayor (2020–2026): Catherine Samson
- Area^{1}: 4.59 km^{2} (1.77 sq mi)
- Elevation: 120 m (390 ft)
- Highest elevation: 159 m (522 ft)
- Lowest elevation: 133 m (436 ft)
- Population (2023): 171
  - Density: 37.3/km^{2} (96.5/sq mi)
- Time zone: UTC+01:00 (CET)
  - Summer (DST): UTC+02:00 (CEST)
- INSEE/Postal code: 27663 /27110
- ^{1} French Land Register data, which excludes lakes, ponds, glaciers > 1 km^{2} (0.386 sq mi or 247 acres) and river estuaries.

Le Troncq (French pronunciation: [lə tʁɔ̃k]) is a commune in the Eure department in Normandy in northern France.

== Population ==
Historical population
Year	Pop.	±% p.a.
1968	135	—
1975	124	−1.21%
1982	129	+0.57%
1990	125	−0.39%
1999	124	−0.09%
2007	155	+2.83%
2012	164	+1.14%
2017	173	+1.07%
2023	171	−0.19%
Source: INSEE

== See also ==
- Communes of the Eure department
