= Quittebeuf =

- Commune
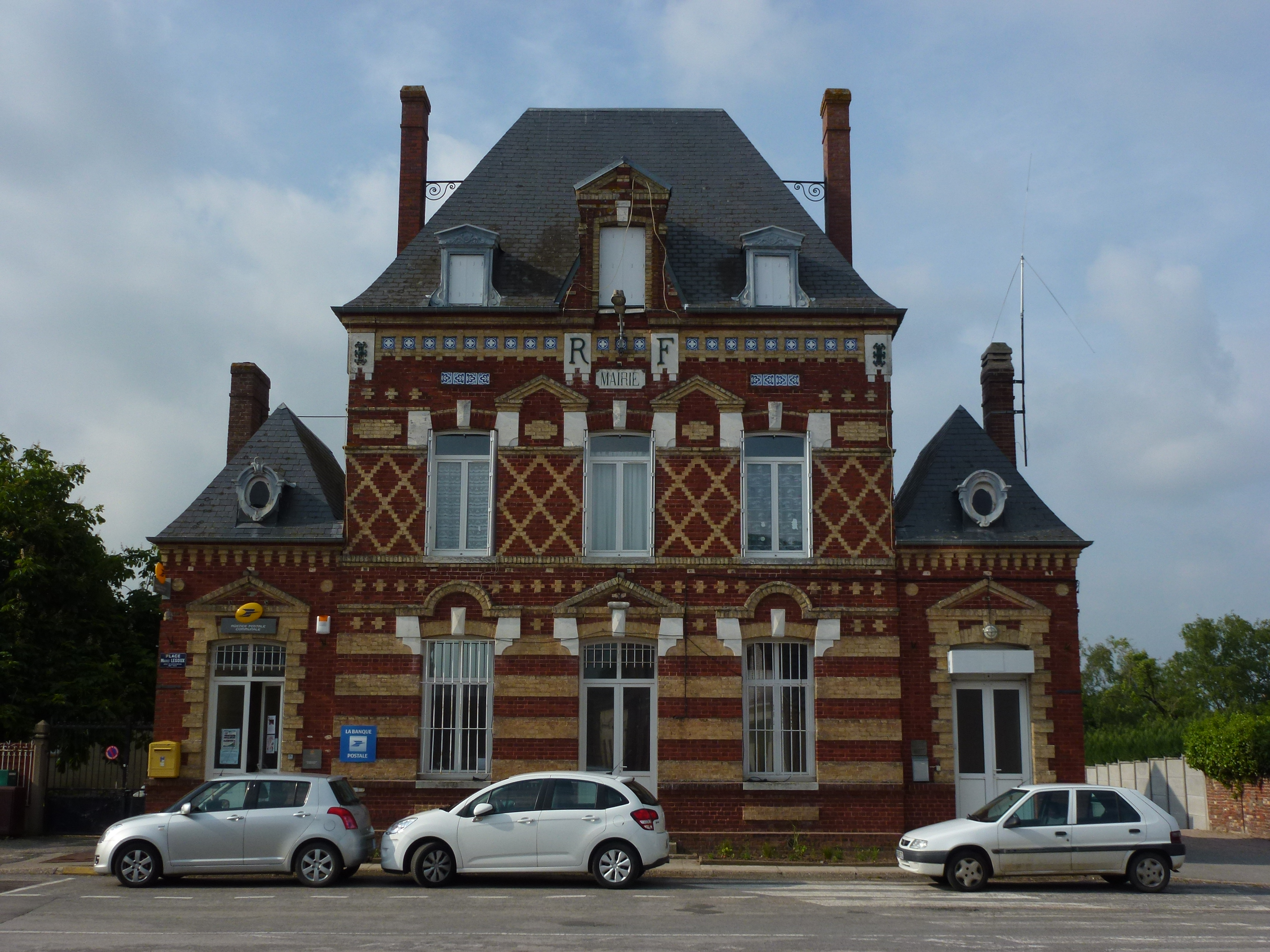
- The town hall in Quittebeuf
- Location of Quittebeuf
- Location within France Location within Normandy
- Coordinates: 49°06′29″N 1°00′39″E
- Country: France
- Region: Normandy
- Department: Eure
- Arrondissement: Bernay
- Canton: Le Neubourg
- Intercommunality: Pays du Neubourg

Government
  - Mayor (2020–2026): Benoît Hennart
- Area^{1}: 13.45 km^{2} (5.19 sq mi)
- Elevation: 140 m (460 ft)
- Highest elevation: 149 m (489 ft)
- Lowest elevation: 131 m (430 ft)
- Population (2023): 656
  - Density: 48.8/km^{2} (126/sq mi)
- Time zone: UTC+01:00 (CET)
  - Summer (DST): UTC+02:00 (CEST)
- INSEE/Postal code: 27486 /27110
- ^{1} French Land Register data, which excludes lakes, ponds, glaciers > 1 km^{2} (0.386 sq mi or 247 acres) and river estuaries.

Quittebeuf (French pronunciation: [kitbœf]) is a commune in the Eure department in Normandy in northern France.

== Population ==
Historical population
Year	Pop.	±% p.a.
1968	404	—
1975	412	+0.28%
1982	482	+2.27%
1990	481	−0.03%
1999	524	+0.96%
2007	607	+1.85%
2012	595	−0.40%
2017	663	+2.19%
2023	656	−0.18%
Source: INSEE

== See also ==
- Communes of the Eure department
