= Saint-Meslin-du-Bosc =

- Commune
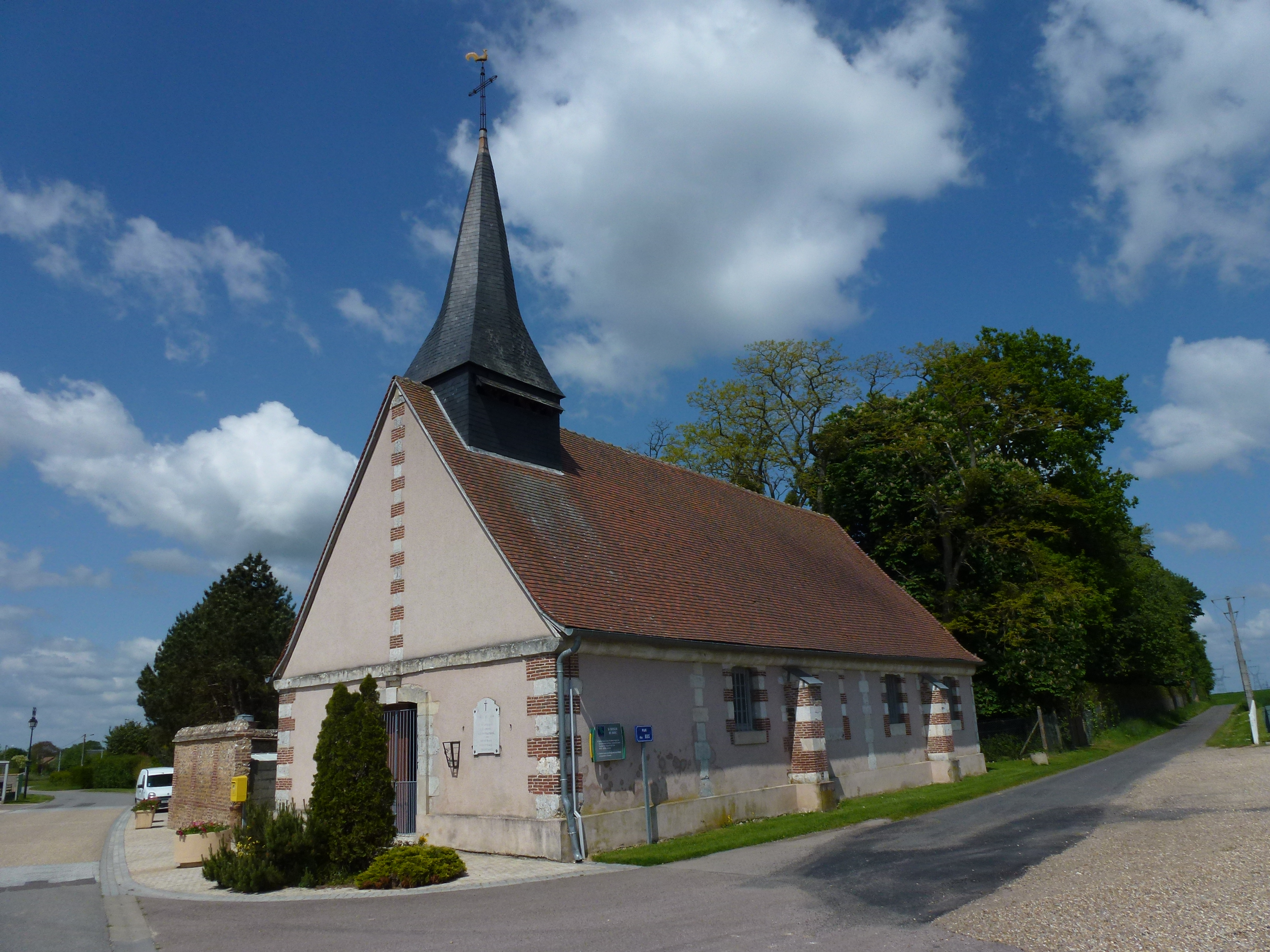
- The church in Saint-Meslin-du-Bosc

- Coat of arms
- Location of Saint-Meslin-du-Bosc
- Location within France Location within Normandy
- Coordinates: 49°12′56″N 0°52′48″E
- Country: France
- Region: Normandy
- Department: Eure
- Arrondissement: Bernay
- Canton: Le Neubourg

Government
  - Mayor (2022–2026): Christian Bonneau
- Area^{1}: 1.57 km^{2} (0.61 sq mi)
- Elevation: 150 m (490 ft)
- Highest elevation: 161 m (528 ft)
- Lowest elevation: 144 m (472 ft)
- Population (2023): 309
  - Density: 197/km^{2} (510/sq mi)
- Time zone: UTC+01:00 (CET)
  - Summer (DST): UTC+02:00 (CEST)
- INSEE/Postal code: 27572 /27370
- ^{1} French Land Register data, which excludes lakes, ponds, glaciers > 1 km^{2} (0.386 sq mi or 247 acres) and river estuaries.

Saint-Meslin-du-Bosc is a commune in the Eure department in Normandy in northern France.

== Population ==
Historical population
Year	Pop.	±% p.a.
1968	76	—
1975	84	+1.44%
1982	95	+1.77%
1990	140	+4.97%
1999	156	+1.21%
2007	219	+4.33%
2012	262	+3.65%
2017	284	+1.63%
2023	309	+1.42%
Source: INSEE

== See also ==
- Communes of the Eure department
