= Émanville, Eure =

Émanville
- Commune
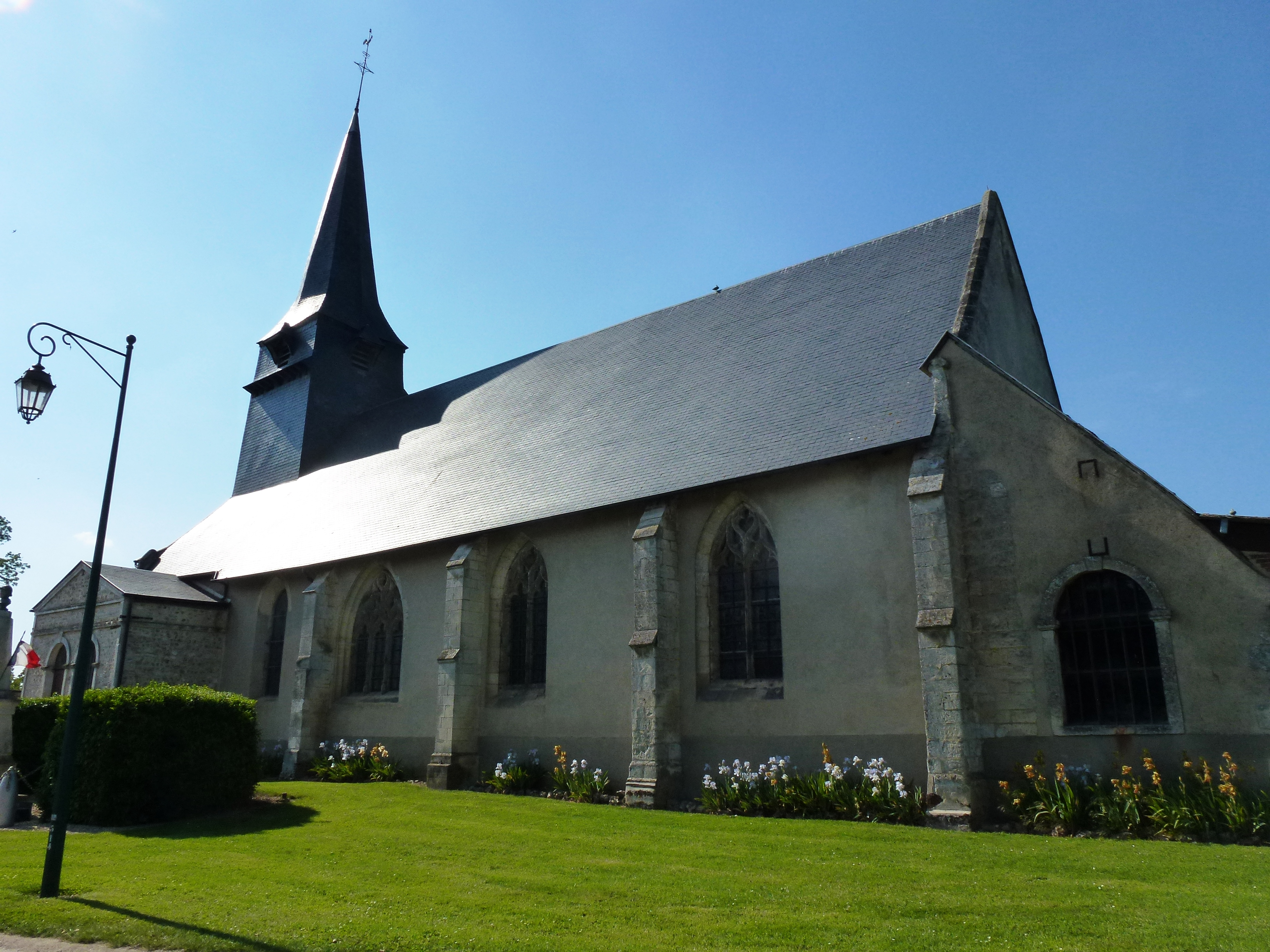
- The church in Émanville
- Location of Émanville
- Location within France Location within Normandy
- Coordinates: 49°03′41″N 0°54′45″E
- Country: France
- Region: Normandy
- Department: Eure
- Arrondissement: Bernay
- Canton: Le Neubourg

Government
  - Mayor (2020–2026): Thierry Dulut
- Area^{1}: 10.76 km^{2} (4.15 sq mi)
- Elevation: 141 m (463 ft)
- Highest elevation: 161 m (528 ft)
- Lowest elevation: 140 m (460 ft)
- Population (2023): 538
  - Density: 50.0/km^{2} (129/sq mi)
- Time zone: UTC+01:00 (CET)
  - Summer (DST): UTC+02:00 (CEST)
- INSEE/Postal code: 27217 /27190
- ^{1} French Land Register data, which excludes lakes, ponds, glaciers > 1 km^{2} (0.386 sq mi or 247 acres) and river estuaries.

Émanville (French pronunciation: [emɑ̃vil]) is a commune in the Eure department in northern France.

== Population ==
Historical population
Year	Pop.	±% p.a.
1968	291	—
1975	361	+3.13%
1982	363	+0.08%
1990	419	+1.81%
1999	464	+1.14%
2007	533	+1.75%
2012	584	+1.84%
2017	572	−0.41%
2023	538	−1.02%
Source: INSEE

== See also ==
- Communes of the Eure department
