= Daubeuf-la-Campagne =

- Commune
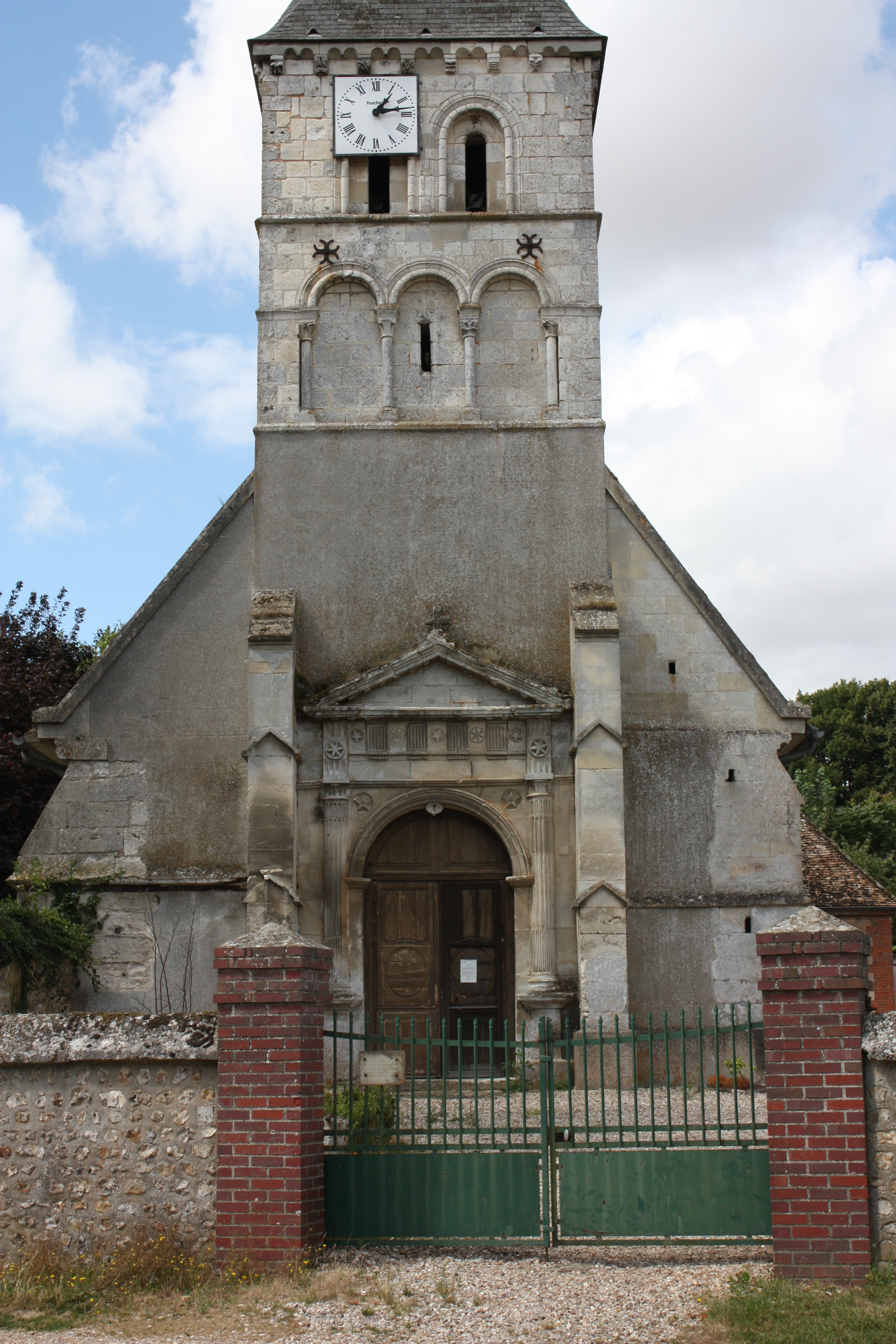
- The church in Daubeuf-la-Campagne
- Location of Daubeuf-la-Campagne
- Location within France Location within Normandy
- Coordinates: 49°11′37″N 1°01′50″E
- Country: France
- Region: Normandy
- Department: Eure
- Arrondissement: Bernay
- Canton: Le Neubourg

Government
  - Mayor (2020–2026): Laurance Bussière
- Area^{1}: 6.34 km^{2} (2.45 sq mi)
- Elevation: 165 m (541 ft)
- Highest elevation: 163 m (535 ft)
- Lowest elevation: 134 m (440 ft)
- Population (2023): 245
  - Density: 38.6/km^{2} (100/sq mi)
- Time zone: UTC+01:00 (CET)
  - Summer (DST): UTC+02:00 (CEST)
- INSEE/Postal code: 27201 /27110
- ^{1} French Land Register data, which excludes lakes, ponds, glaciers > 1 km^{2} (0.386 sq mi or 247 acres) and river estuaries.

Daubeuf-la-Campagne (French pronunciation: [dobœf la kɑ̃paɲ]) is a commune in the Eure department in north-western France.

== Population ==
Historical population
Year	Pop.	±% p.a.
1968	225	—
1975	212	−0.85%
1982	213	+0.07%
1990	180	−2.08%
1999	199	+1.12%
2007	201	+0.13%
2012	231	+2.82%
2017	233	+0.17%
2023	245	+0.84%
Source: INSEE

== See also ==
- Communes of the Eure department
