= Canton of Quillebeuf-sur-Seine =

Coordinates: 49°25′08″N 0°33′14″E

The canton of Quillebeuf-sur-Seine is a former canton of the Eure département, in northwestern France. It had 6,228 inhabitants (2012). It was disbanded following the French canton reorganisation which came into effect in March 2015. It consisted of 14 communes, which joined the canton of Bourg-Achard in 2015.

The canton comprised the following communes:

- Aizier
- Bouquelon
- Bourneville
- Marais-Vernier
- Quillebeuf-sur-Seine
- Saint-Aubin-sur-Quillebeuf
- Sainte-Croix sur-Aizier
- Sainte-Opportune-la-Mare
- Saint-Ouen-des-Champs
- Saint-Samson-de-la-Roque
- Saint-Thurien
- Tocqueville
- Trouville-la-Haule
- Vieux-Port
