= La Trinité =

La Trinité may refer to:

== Places in France ==
- La Trinité, Alpes-Maritimes (AKA La Trinité-Victor), in the Alpes-Maritimes département
- La Trinité, Eure, in the Eure département
- La Trinité, Manche, in the Manche département
- La Trinité, Martinique, in the Martinique overseas department
- La Trinité, Savoie, in the Savoie département
- La Trinité-de-Réville, in the Eure département
- La Trinité-des-Laitiers, in the Orne département
- La Trinité-de-Thouberville, in the Eure département
- La Trinité-du-Mont, in the Seine-Maritime département
- La Trinité-Porhoët, in the Morbihan département
- La Trinité-sur-Mer, in the Morbihan département
- La Trinité-Surzur, in the Morbihan département

== Other ==
- Église de la Sainte-Trinité, Paris, a Roman Catholic church in Paris

== See also ==
- Holy Trinity (disambiguation), the English version of the French expression
