= Bosgouet =

Bosgouët
- Commune
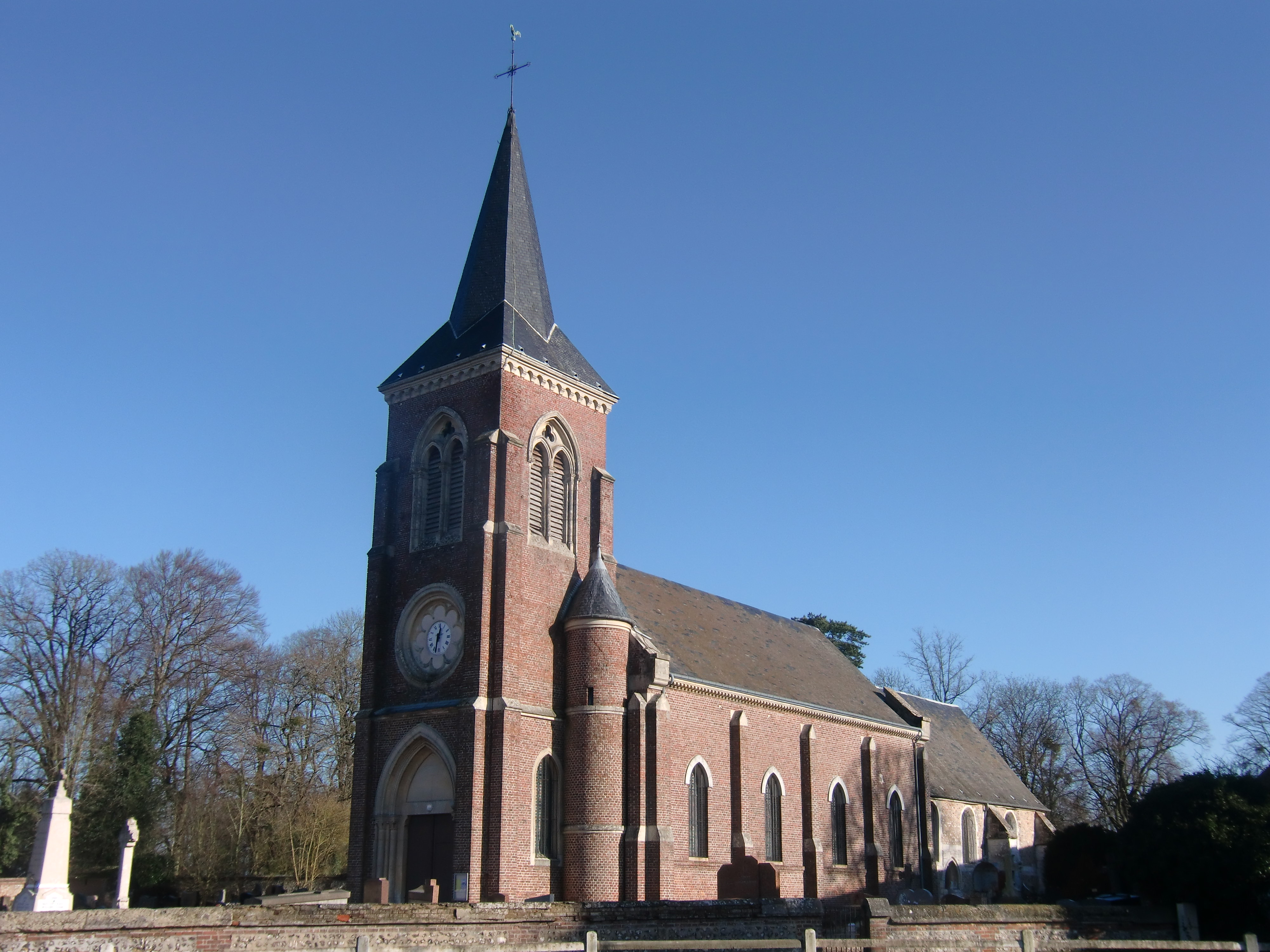
- The church in Bosgouet
- Location of Bosgouët
- Location within France Location within Normandy
- Coordinates: 49°21′33″N 0°51′03″E
- Country: France
- Region: Normandy
- Department: Eure
- Arrondissement: Bernay
- Canton: Bourg-Achard

Government
  - Mayor (2020–2026): Franck Bertin
- Area^{1}: 9.55 km^{2} (3.69 sq mi)
- Elevation: 140 m (460 ft)
- Highest elevation: 138 m (453 ft)
- Lowest elevation: 69 m (226 ft)
- Population (2023): 793
  - Density: 83.0/km^{2} (215/sq mi)
- Time zone: UTC+01:00 (CET)
  - Summer (DST): UTC+02:00 (CEST)
- INSEE/Postal code: 27091 /27310
- ^{1} French Land Register data, which excludes lakes, ponds, glaciers > 1 km^{2} (0.386 sq mi or 247 acres) and river estuaries.

Bosgouet is a commune in the Eure department in Normandy in northern France.

== Population ==
Historical population
Year	Pop.	±% p.a.
1968	353	—
1975	422	+2.58%
1982	524	+3.14%
1990	569	+1.04%
1999	548	−0.42%
2007	581	+0.73%
2012	624	+1.44%
2017	707	+2.53%
2023	793	+1.93%
Source: INSEE

== See also ==
- Communes of the Eure department
