= Valletot =

- Commune
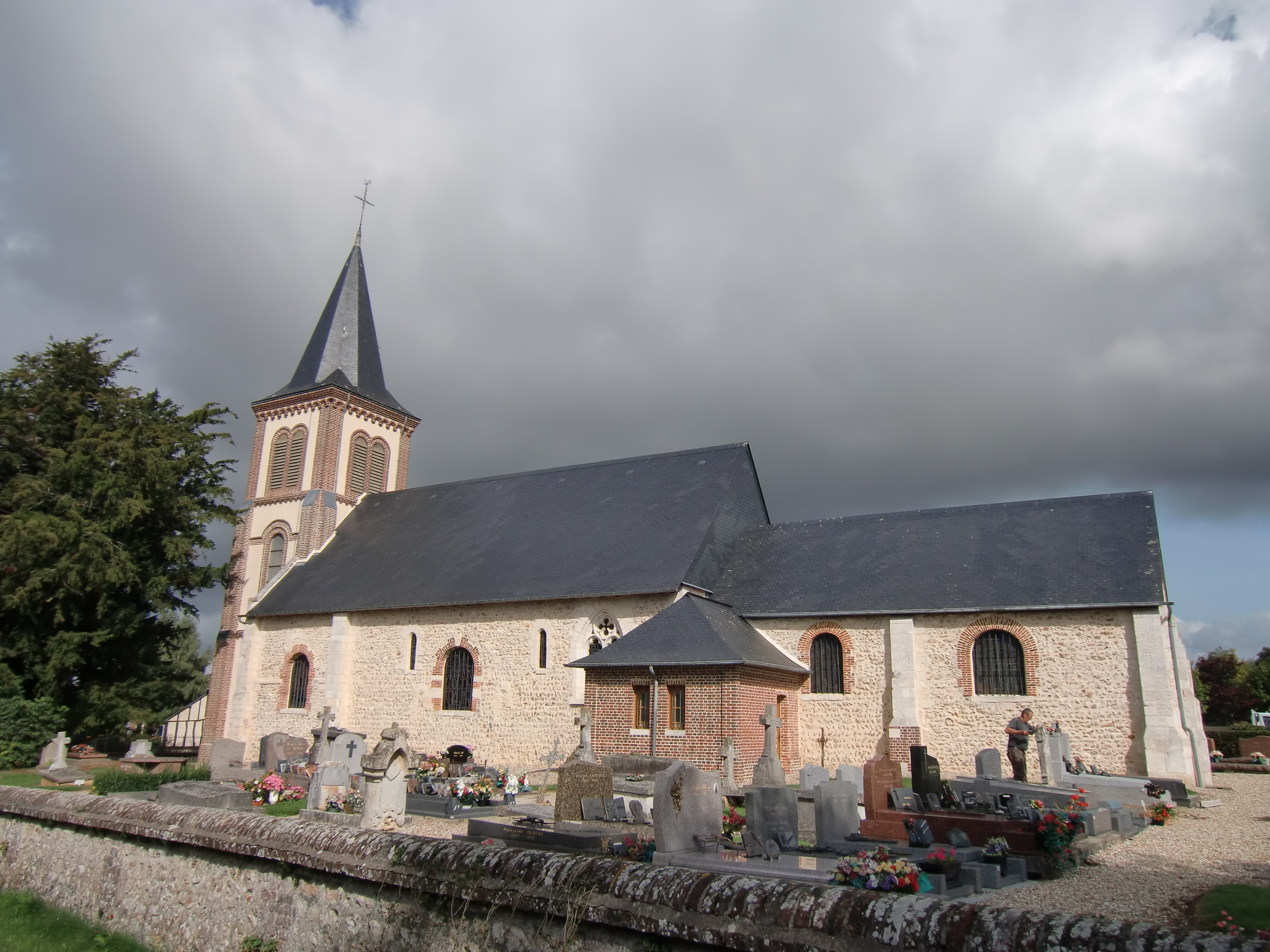
- The church in Valletot
- Location of Valletot
- Location within France Location within Normandy
- Coordinates: 49°21′53″N 0°37′26″E
- Country: France
- Region: Normandy
- Department: Eure
- Arrondissement: Bernay
- Canton: Bourg-Achard

Government
  - Mayor (2020–2026): Dominique Levasseur
- Area^{1}: 5.79 km^{2} (2.24 sq mi)
- Elevation: 126 m (413 ft)
- Highest elevation: 136 m (446 ft)
- Lowest elevation: 45 m (148 ft)
- Population (2023): 408
  - Density: 70.5/km^{2} (183/sq mi)
- Time zone: UTC+01:00 (CET)
  - Summer (DST): UTC+02:00 (CEST)
- INSEE/Postal code: 27669 /27350
- ^{1} French Land Register data, which excludes lakes, ponds, glaciers > 1 km^{2} (0.386 sq mi or 247 acres) and river estuaries.

Valletot (French pronunciation: [valto]) is a commune in the Eure department in Normandy in northern France.

== Population ==
Historical population
Year	Pop.	±% p.a.
1968	211	—
1975	234	+1.49%
1982	216	−1.14%
1990	231	+0.84%
1999	254	+1.06%
2007	309	+2.48%
2012	348	+2.41%
2017	424	+4.03%
2023	408	−0.64%
Source: INSEE

== See also ==
- Communes of the Eure department
