= Étréville =

- Commune
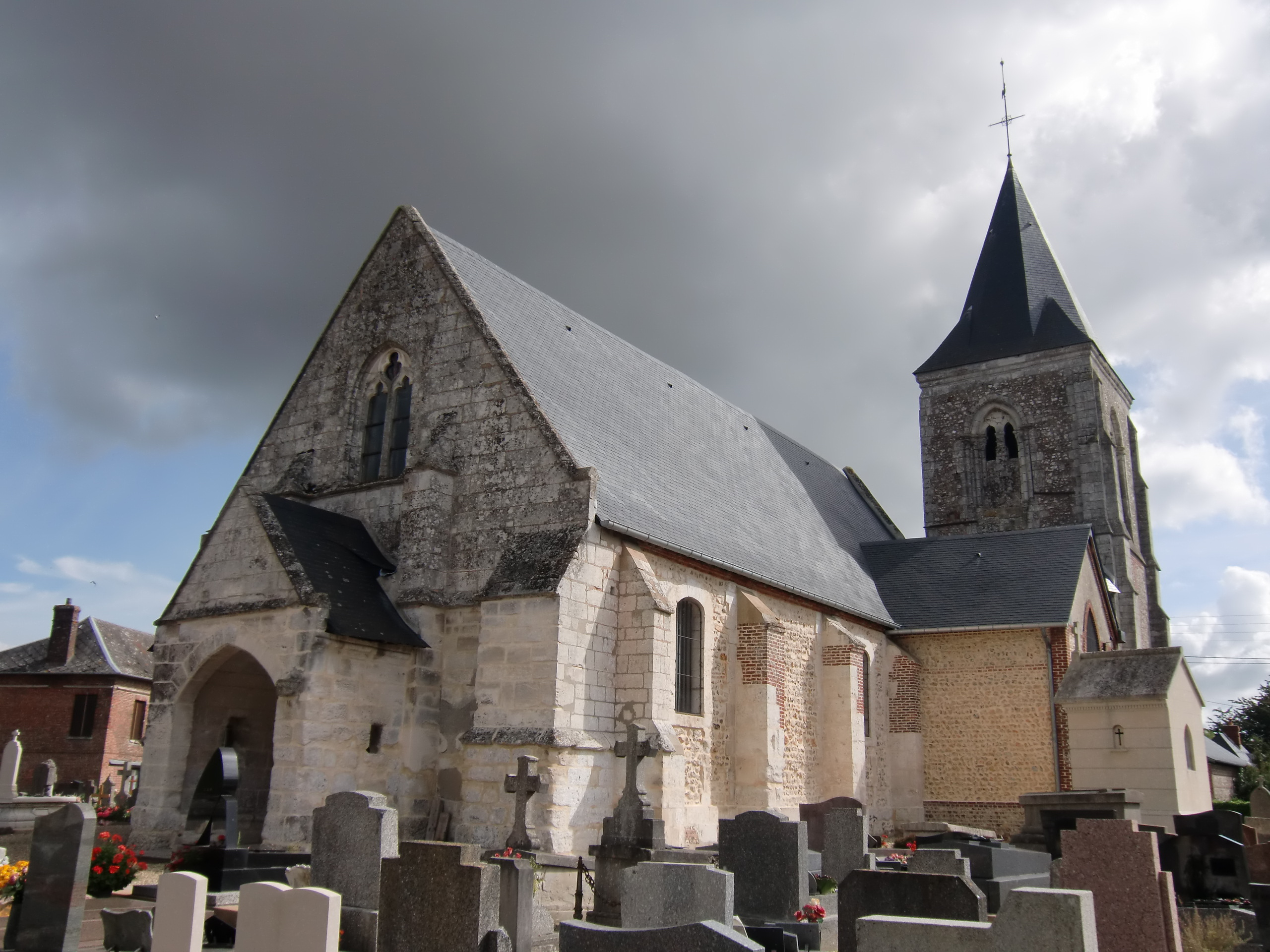
- The church in Étréville

- Coat of arms
- Location of Étréville
- Location within France Location within Normandy
- Coordinates: 49°22′22″N 0°39′04″E
- Country: France
- Region: Normandy
- Department: Eure
- Arrondissement: Bernay
- Canton: Bourg-Achard

Government
  - Mayor (2025–2026): Sylvain Gallais
- Area^{1}: 11.23 km^{2} (4.34 sq mi)
- Elevation: 133 m (436 ft)
- Highest elevation: 136 m (446 ft)
- Lowest elevation: 65 m (213 ft)
- Population (2023): 651
  - Density: 58.0/km^{2} (150/sq mi)
- Time zone: UTC+01:00 (CET)
  - Summer (DST): UTC+02:00 (CEST)
- INSEE/Postal code: 27227 /27350
- ^{1} French Land Register data, which excludes lakes, ponds, glaciers > 1 km^{2} (0.386 sq mi or 247 acres) and river estuaries.

Étréville (French pronunciation: [etʁevil]) is a commune in the Eure department in the Normandy region in north-western France.

== Population ==
Historical population
Year	Pop.	±% p.a.
1968	472	—
1975	427	−1.42%
1982	437	+0.33%
1990	461	+0.67%
1999	508	+1.08%
2007	543	+0.84%
2012	642	+3.41%
2017	676	+1.04%
2023	651	−0.63%
Source: INSEE

== See also ==
- Communes of the Eure department
