= Bouquetot =

- Commune
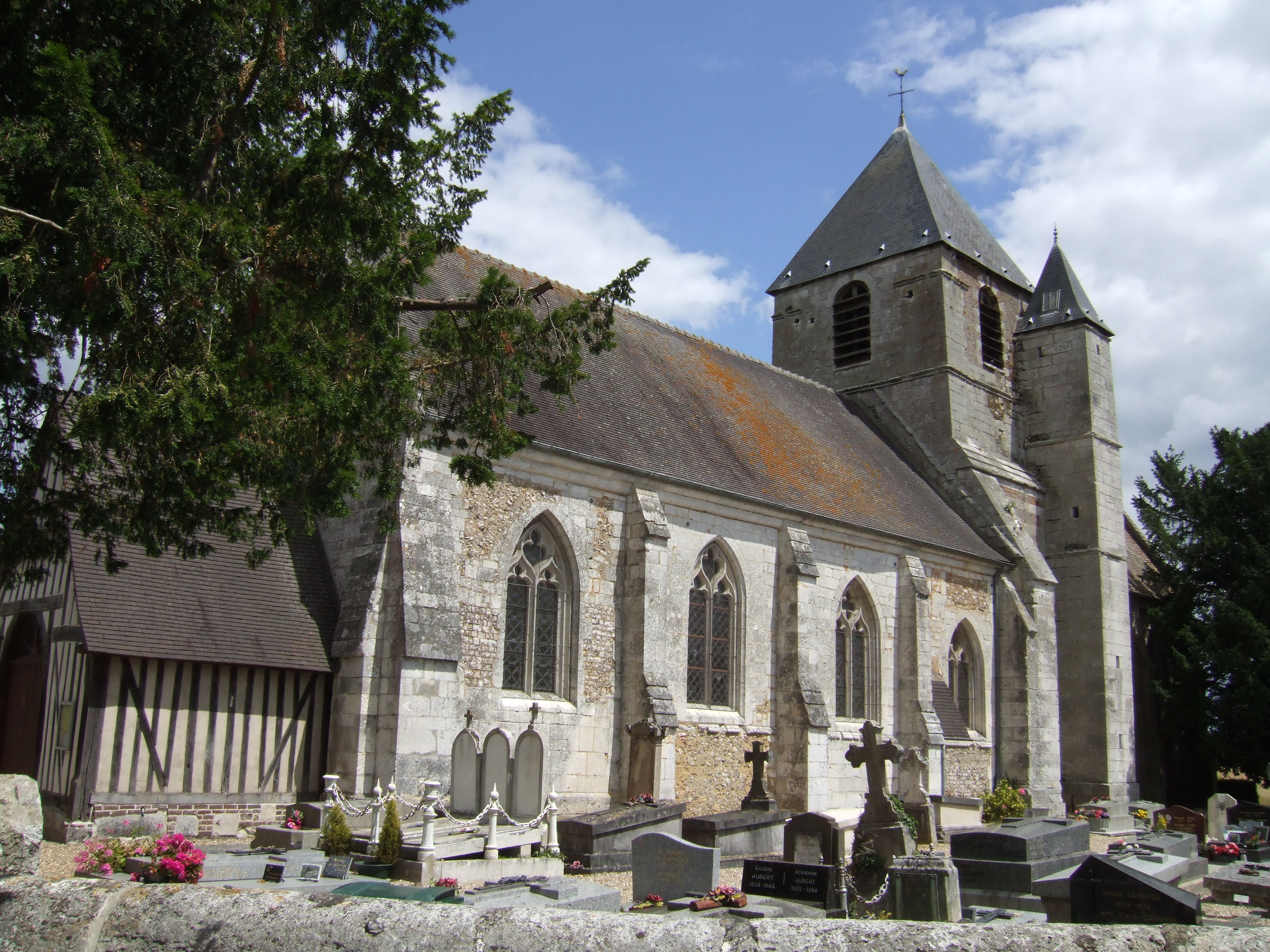
- The church in Bouquetot
- Location of Bouquetot
- Location within France Location within Normandy
- Coordinates: 49°21′50″N 0°46′59″E
- Country: France
- Region: Normandy
- Department: Eure
- Arrondissement: Bernay
- Canton: Bourg-Achard

Government
  - Mayor (2020–2026): Joël Grainville
- Area^{1}: 13.07 km^{2} (5.05 sq mi)
- Elevation: 132 m (433 ft)
- Highest elevation: 146 m (479 ft)
- Lowest elevation: 99 m (325 ft)
- Population (2023): 1,071
  - Density: 81.94/km^{2} (212.2/sq mi)
- Time zone: UTC+01:00 (CET)
  - Summer (DST): UTC+02:00 (CEST)
- INSEE/Postal code: 27102 /27310
- ^{1} French Land Register data, which excludes lakes, ponds, glaciers > 1 km^{2} (0.386 sq mi or 247 acres) and river estuaries.

Bouquetot (French pronunciation: [bukto]) is a commune in the Eure department in Normandy in northern France.

== Population ==
Historical population
Year	Pop.	±% p.a.
1968	513	—
1975	589	+1.99%
1982	645	+1.31%
1990	781	+2.42%
1999	840	+0.81%
2007	993	+2.11%
2012	1,067	+1.45%
2017	1,060	−0.13%
2023	1,071	+0.17%
Source: INSEE

== See also ==
- Communes of the Eure department
