= Hauville =

- Commune
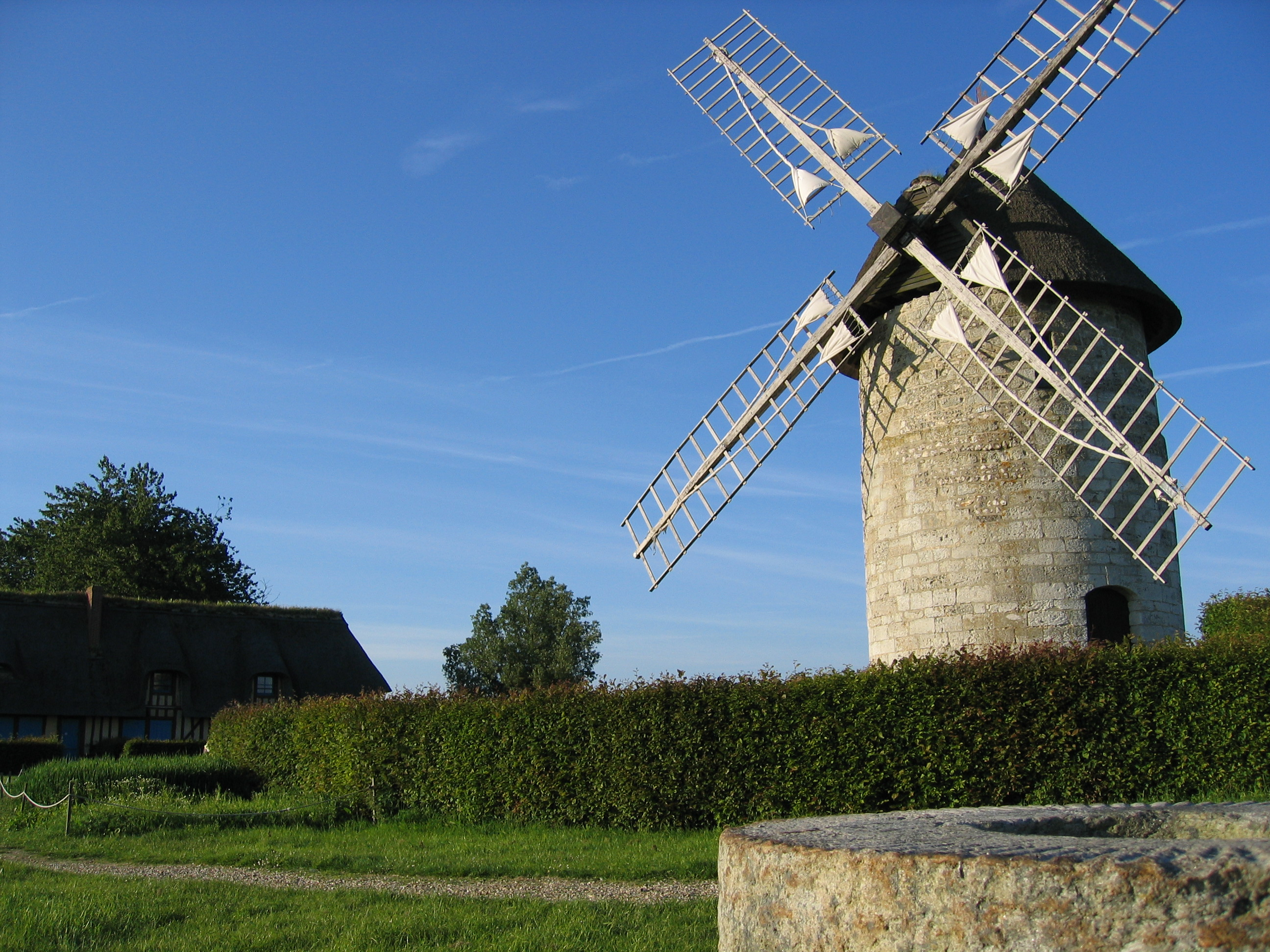
- The windmill in Hauville

- Coat of arms
- Location of Hauville
- Location within France Location within Normandy
- Coordinates: 49°23′50″N 0°46′15″E
- Country: France
- Region: Normandy
- Department: Eure
- Arrondissement: Bernay
- Canton: Bourg-Achard

Government
  - Mayor (2020–2026): William Mignot
- Area^{1}: 14.69 km^{2} (5.67 sq mi)
- Elevation: 148 m (486 ft)
- Highest elevation: 148 m (486 ft)
- Lowest elevation: 80 m (260 ft)
- Population (2023): 1,247
  - Density: 84.89/km^{2} (219.9/sq mi)
- Time zone: UTC+01:00 (CET)
  - Summer (DST): UTC+02:00 (CEST)
- INSEE/Postal code: 27316 /27350
- ^{1} French Land Register data, which excludes lakes, ponds, glaciers > 1 km^{2} (0.386 sq mi or 247 acres) and river estuaries.

Hauville (French pronunciation: [ovil]) is a commune in the Eure department in northern France.

== Population ==
Historical population
Year	Pop.	±% p.a.
1968	716	—
1975	817	+1.90%
1982	1,013	+3.12%
1990	1,051	+0.46%
1999	1,115	+0.66%
2007	1,257	+1.51%
2012	1,290	+0.52%
2017	1,279	−0.17%
2023	1,247	−0.42%
Source: INSEE

== See also ==
- Communes of the Eure department
