= Cauverville-en-Roumois =

- Commune
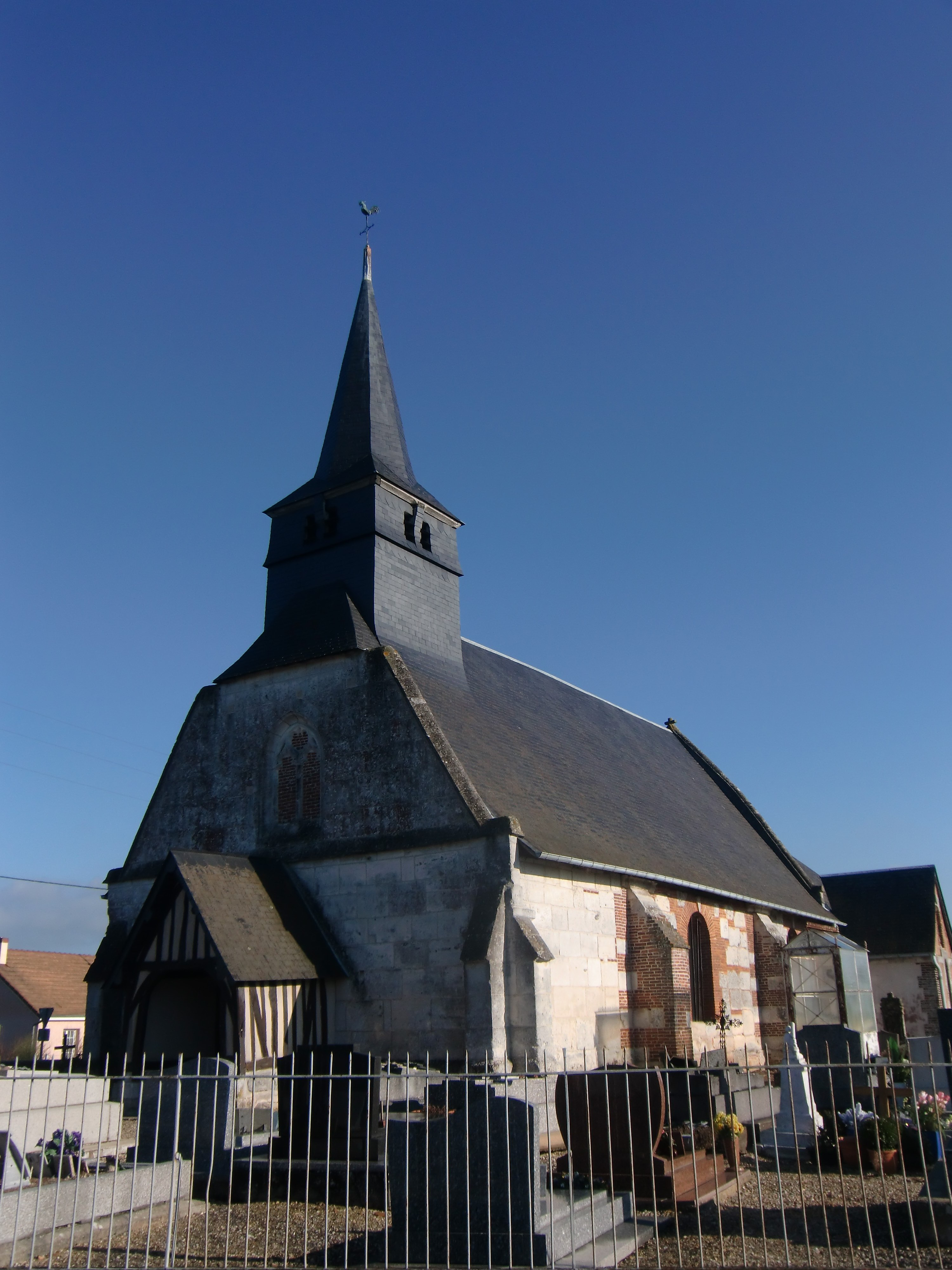
- The church in Cauverville-en-Roumois
- Location of Cauverville-en-Roumois
- Location within France Location within Normandy
- Coordinates: 49°21′06″N 0°38′50″E
- Country: France
- Region: Normandy
- Department: Eure
- Arrondissement: Bernay
- Canton: Bourg-Achard

Government
  - Mayor (2020–2026): Martine Tihy
- Area^{1}: 3.24 km^{2} (1.25 sq mi)
- Elevation: 133 m (436 ft)
- Highest elevation: 137 m (449 ft)
- Lowest elevation: 100 m (330 ft)
- Population (2023): 210
  - Density: 65/km^{2} (170/sq mi)
- Time zone: UTC+01:00 (CET)
  - Summer (DST): UTC+02:00 (CEST)
- INSEE/Postal code: 27134 /27350
- ^{1} French Land Register data, which excludes lakes, ponds, glaciers > 1 km^{2} (0.386 sq mi or 247 acres) and river estuaries.

Cauverville-en-Roumois (French pronunciation: [kovɛʁvil ɑ̃ ʁumwa], literally Cauverville in Roumois) is a commune in the Eure department in northern France.

== Population ==
Historical population
| Year | Pop. | ±% p.a. |
|---|---|---|
| 1968 | 101 | — |
| 1975 | 107 | +0.83% |
| 1982 | 119 | +1.53% |
| 1990 | 132 | +1.30% |
| 1999 | 171 | +2.92% |
| 2007 | 187 | +1.12% |
| 2012 | 227 | +3.95% |
| 2017 | 226 | −0.09% |
| 2023 | 210 | −1.22% |
Source: INSEE

== See also ==
- Communes of the Eure department
