= Honguemare-Guenouville =

- Commune
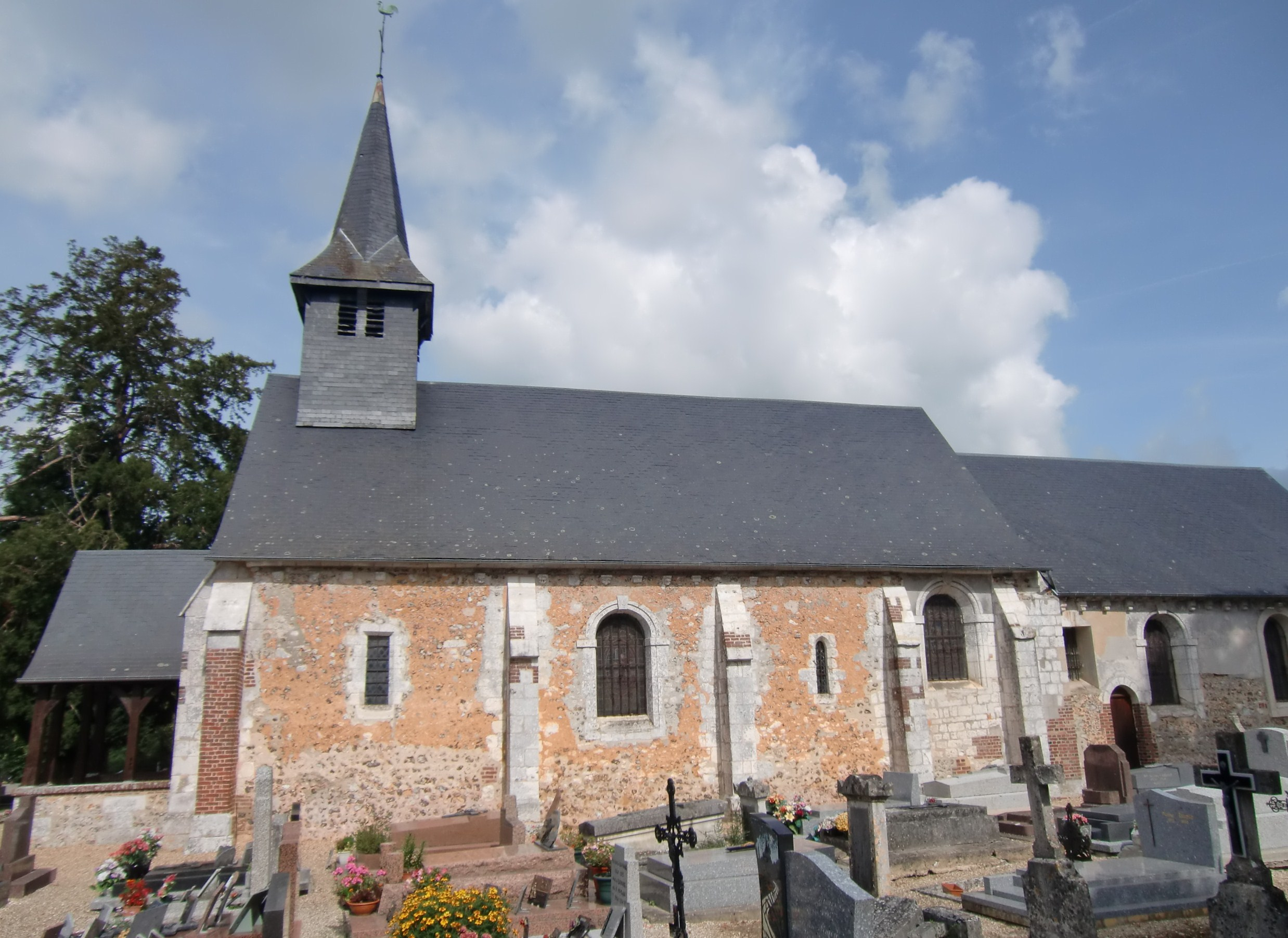
- The church of Notre-Dame in Honguemare-Guenouville
- Location of Honguemare-Guenouville
- Location within France Location within Normandy
- Coordinates: 49°22′23″N 0°49′04″E
- Country: France
- Region: Normandy
- Department: Eure
- Arrondissement: Bernay
- Canton: Bourg-Achard

Government
  - Mayor (2021–2026): David Taurin
- Area^{1}: 9.3 km^{2} (3.6 sq mi)
- Elevation: 141 m (463 ft)
- Highest elevation: 148 m (486 ft)
- Lowest elevation: 83 m (272 ft)
- Population (2023): 704
  - Density: 76/km^{2} (200/sq mi)
- Time zone: UTC+01:00 (CET)
  - Summer (DST): UTC+02:00 (CEST)
- INSEE/Postal code: 27340 /27310
- ^{1} French Land Register data, which excludes lakes, ponds, glaciers > 1 km^{2} (0.386 sq mi or 247 acres) and river estuaries.

Honguemare-Guenouville (French pronunciation: [ɔ̃ɡmaʁ ɡənuvil]) is a commune in the Eure department in northern France.

== Population ==
Historical population
Year	Pop.	±% p.a.
1968	424	—
1975	428	+0.13%
1982	477	+1.56%
1990	613	+3.19%
1999	606	−0.13%
2007	581	−0.53%
2012	630	+1.63%
2017	696	+2.01%
2023	704	+0.19%
Source: INSEE

== See also ==
- Communes of the Eure department
