= Éturqueraye =

- Commune
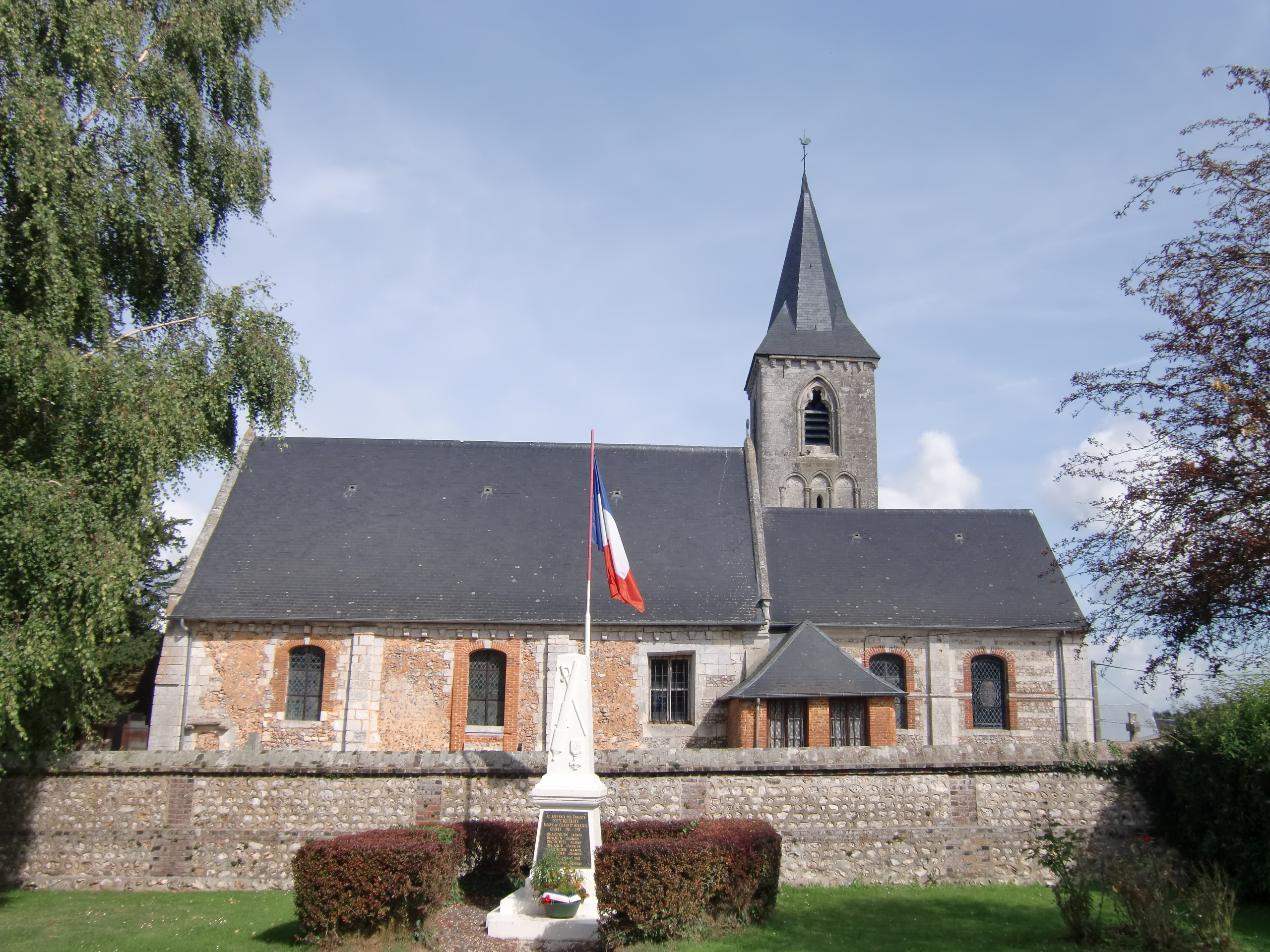
- The church in Éturqueraye
- Location of Éturqueraye
- Location within France Location within Normandy
- Coordinates: 49°22′15″N 0°41′43″E
- Country: France
- Region: Normandy
- Department: Eure
- Arrondissement: Bernay
- Canton: Bourg-Achard

Government
  - Mayor (2020–2026): Claude Gence
- Area^{1}: 6.72 km^{2} (2.59 sq mi)
- Elevation: 139 m (456 ft)
- Highest elevation: 139 m (456 ft)
- Lowest elevation: 103 m (338 ft)
- Population (2023): 303
  - Density: 45.1/km^{2} (117/sq mi)
- Time zone: UTC+01:00 (CET)
  - Summer (DST): UTC+02:00 (CEST)
- INSEE/Postal code: 27228 /27350
- ^{1} French Land Register data, which excludes lakes, ponds, glaciers > 1 km^{2} (0.386 sq mi or 247 acres) and river estuaries.

Éturqueraye (French pronunciation: [etyʁkəʁɛ]) is a commune in the Eure department in the Normandy region of north-western France.

== Population ==
Historical population
| Year | Pop. | ±% p.a. |
|---|---|---|
| 1968 | 203 | — |
| 1975 | 200 | −0.21% |
| 1982 | 237 | +2.45% |
| 1990 | 237 | +0.00% |
| 1999 | 245 | +0.37% |
| 2007 | 270 | +1.22% |
| 2012 | 280 | +0.73% |
| 2017 | 298 | +1.25% |
| 2023 | 303 | +0.28% |
Source: INSEE

== See also ==
- Communes of the Eure department
