= Routot =

- Commune
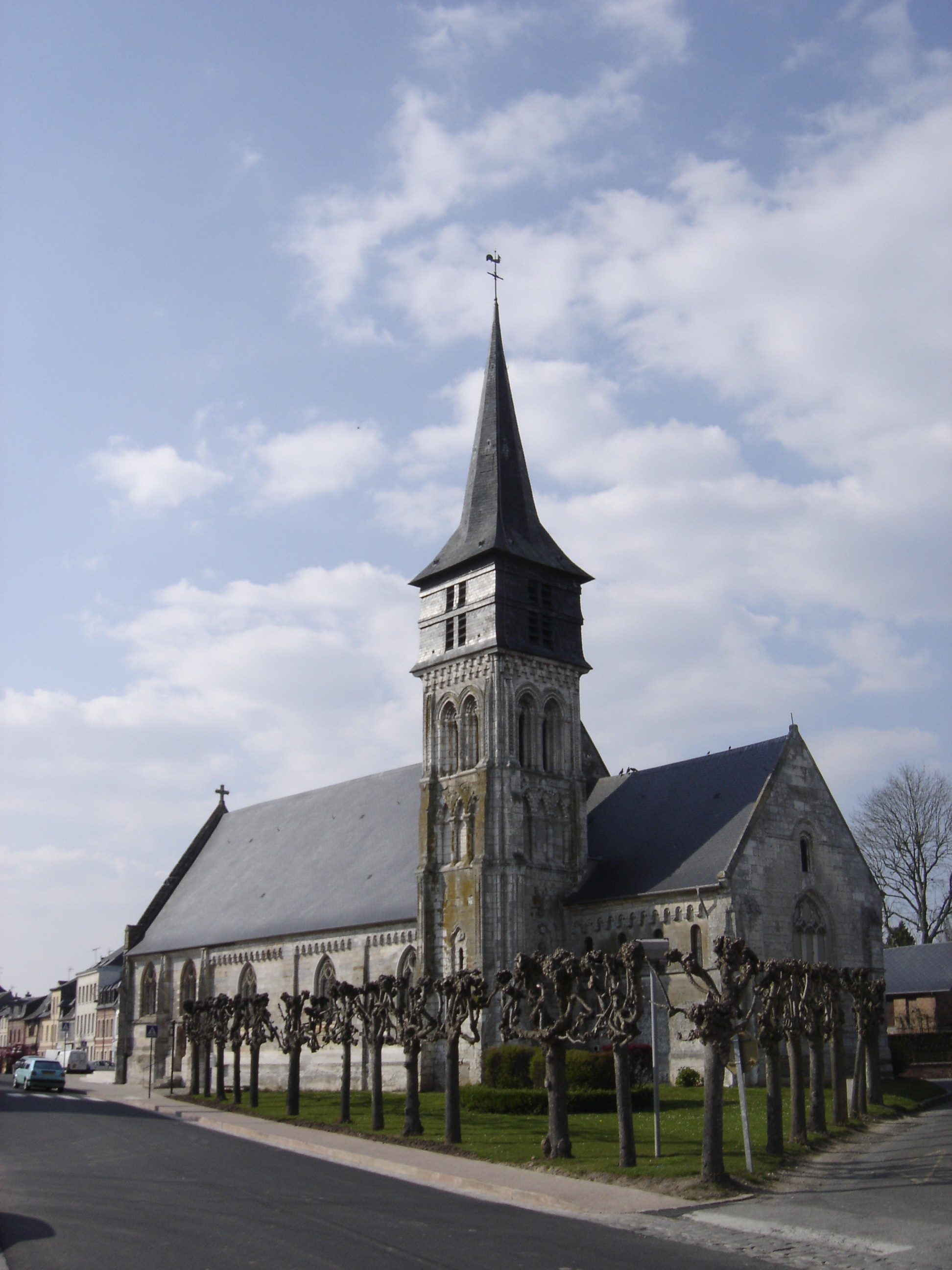
- The church in Routot

- Coat of arms
- Location of Routot
- Location within France Location within Normandy
- Coordinates: 49°22′44″N 0°44′08″E
- Country: France
- Region: Normandy
- Department: Eure
- Arrondissement: Bernay
- Canton: Bourg-Achard

Government
  - Mayor (2020–2026): Marie-Jean Douyere
- Area^{1}: 6.61 km^{2} (2.55 sq mi)
- Elevation: 140 m (460 ft)
- Highest elevation: 142 m (466 ft)
- Lowest elevation: 91 m (299 ft)
- Population (2023): 1,648
  - Density: 249/km^{2} (646/sq mi)
- Time zone: UTC+01:00 (CET)
  - Summer (DST): UTC+02:00 (CEST)
- INSEE/Postal code: 27500 /27350
- ^{1} French Land Register data, which excludes lakes, ponds, glaciers > 1 km^{2} (0.386 sq mi or 247 acres) and river estuaries.

Routot (French pronunciation: [ʁuto]) is a commune in the Eure department in north-western France.

== Population ==
Historical population
Year	Pop.	±% p.a.
1968	882	—
1975	988	+1.63%
1982	1,079	+1.27%
1990	1,043	−0.42%
1999	1,115	+0.74%
2007	1,340	+2.32%
2012	1,434	+1.37%
2017	1,600	+2.21%
2023	1,648	+0.49%
Source: INSEE

== See also ==
- Communes of the Eure department
