= Caumont, Eure =

Caumont
- Commune
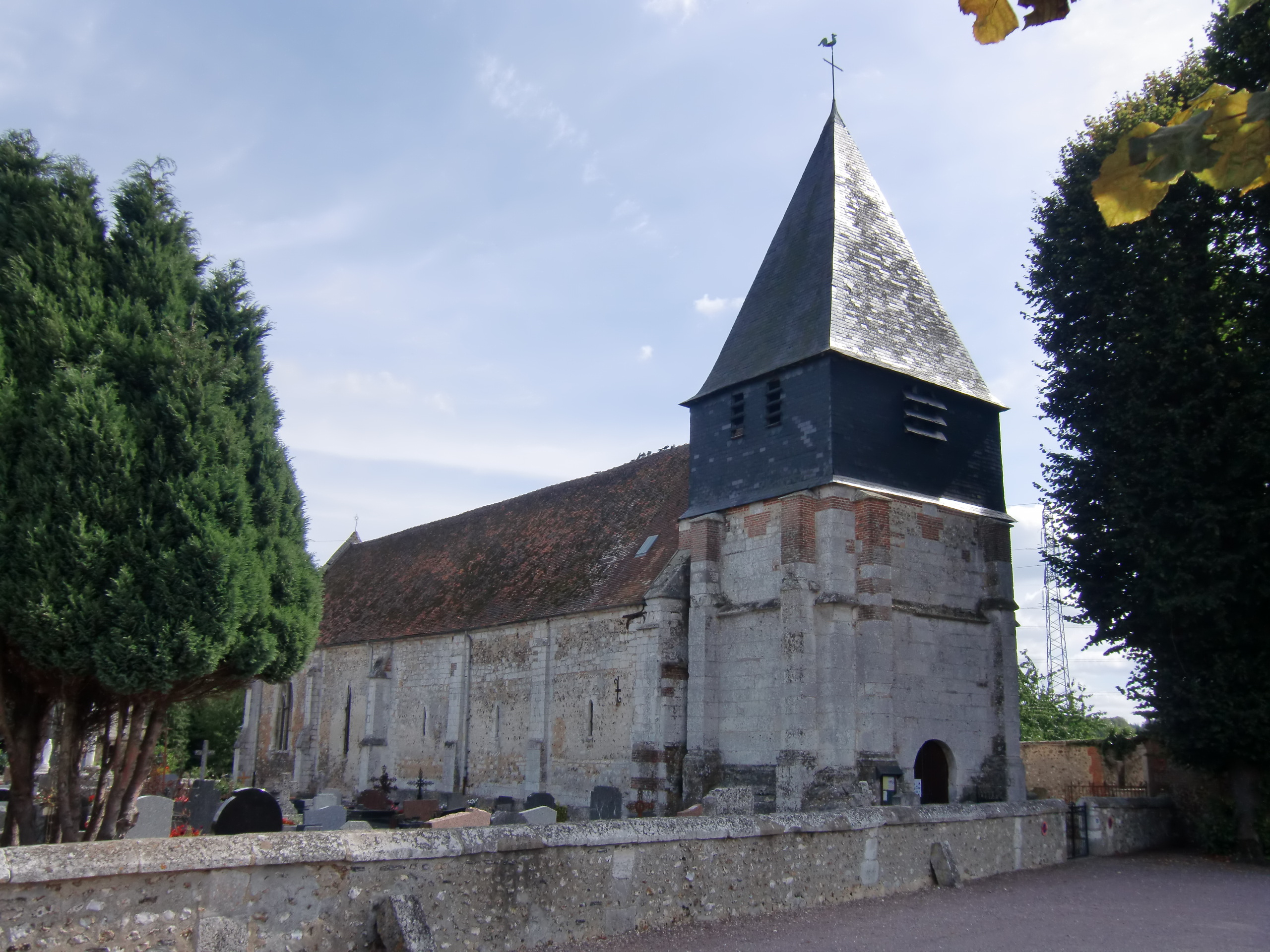
- The church in Caumont
- Location of Caumont
- Location within France Location within Normandy
- Coordinates: 49°22′02″N 0°53′47″E
- Country: France
- Region: Normandy
- Department: Eure
- Arrondissement: Bernay
- Canton: Bourg-Achard

Government
  - Mayor (2020–2026): Sylvain Bonenfant
- Area^{1}: 6 km^{2} (2.3 sq mi)
- Elevation: 144 m (472 ft)
- Highest elevation: 140 m (460 ft)
- Lowest elevation: 1 m (3.3 ft)
- Population (2023): 1,149
  - Density: 190/km^{2} (500/sq mi)
- Time zone: UTC+01:00 (CET)
  - Summer (DST): UTC+02:00 (CEST)
- INSEE/Postal code: 27133 /27310
- ^{1} French Land Register data, which excludes lakes, ponds, glaciers > 1 km^{2} (0.386 sq mi or 247 acres) and river estuaries.

Caumont (French pronunciation: [komɔ̃]) is a commune in the Eure department in northern France.

== Population ==
Historical population
Year	Pop.	±% p.a.
1968	605	—
1975	633	+0.65%
1982	759	+2.63%
1990	951	+2.86%
1999	995	+0.50%
2007	1,003	+0.10%
2012	1,004	+0.02%
2017	1,058	+1.05%
2023	1,149	+1.38%
Source: INSEE

== See also ==
- Communes of the Eure department
