= Le Landin =

- Commune
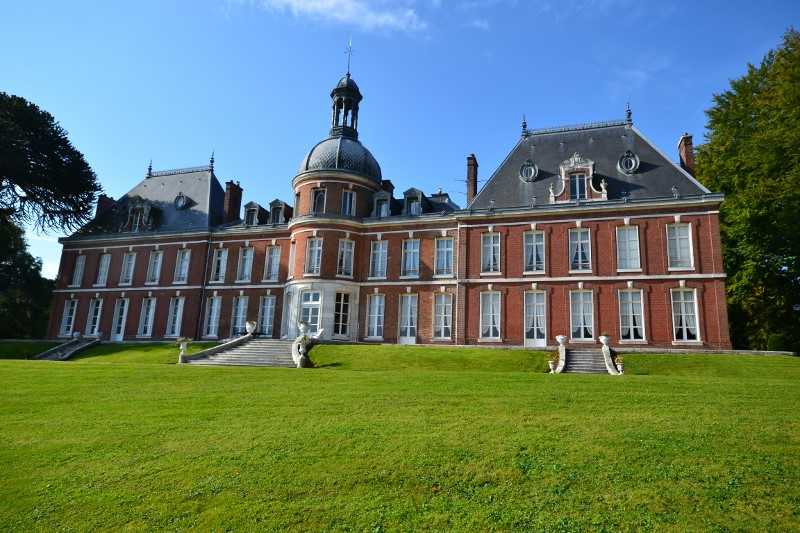
- Château
- Location of Le Landin
- Location within France Location within Normandy
- Coordinates: 49°24′11″N 0°47′58″E
- Country: France
- Region: Normandy
- Department: Eure
- Arrondissement: Bernay
- Canton: Bourg-Achard
- Intercommunality: Roumois Seine

Government
  - Mayor (2020–2026): Michel Dezellus
- Area^{1}: 3.15 km^{2} (1.22 sq mi)
- Elevation: 144 m (472 ft)
- Highest elevation: 144 m (472 ft)
- Lowest elevation: 1 m (3.3 ft)
- Population (2023): 254
  - Density: 80.6/km^{2} (209/sq mi)
- Time zone: UTC+01:00 (CET)
  - Summer (DST): UTC+02:00 (CEST)
- INSEE/Postal code: 27363 /27350
- ^{1} French Land Register data, which excludes lakes, ponds, glaciers > 1 km^{2} (0.386 sq mi or 247 acres) and river estuaries.

Le Landin (French pronunciation: [lə lɑ̃dɛ̃]) is a commune in the Eure department in Normandy in north-western France.

== Population ==
Historical population
Year	Pop.	±% p.a.
1968	108	—
1975	96	−1.67%
1982	103	+1.01%
1990	160	+5.66%
1999	151	−0.64%
2007	167	+1.27%
2012	188	+2.40%
2017	209	+2.14%
2023	254	+3.30%
Source: INSEE

== See also ==
- Communes of the Eure department
