= Rougemontier =

- Commune
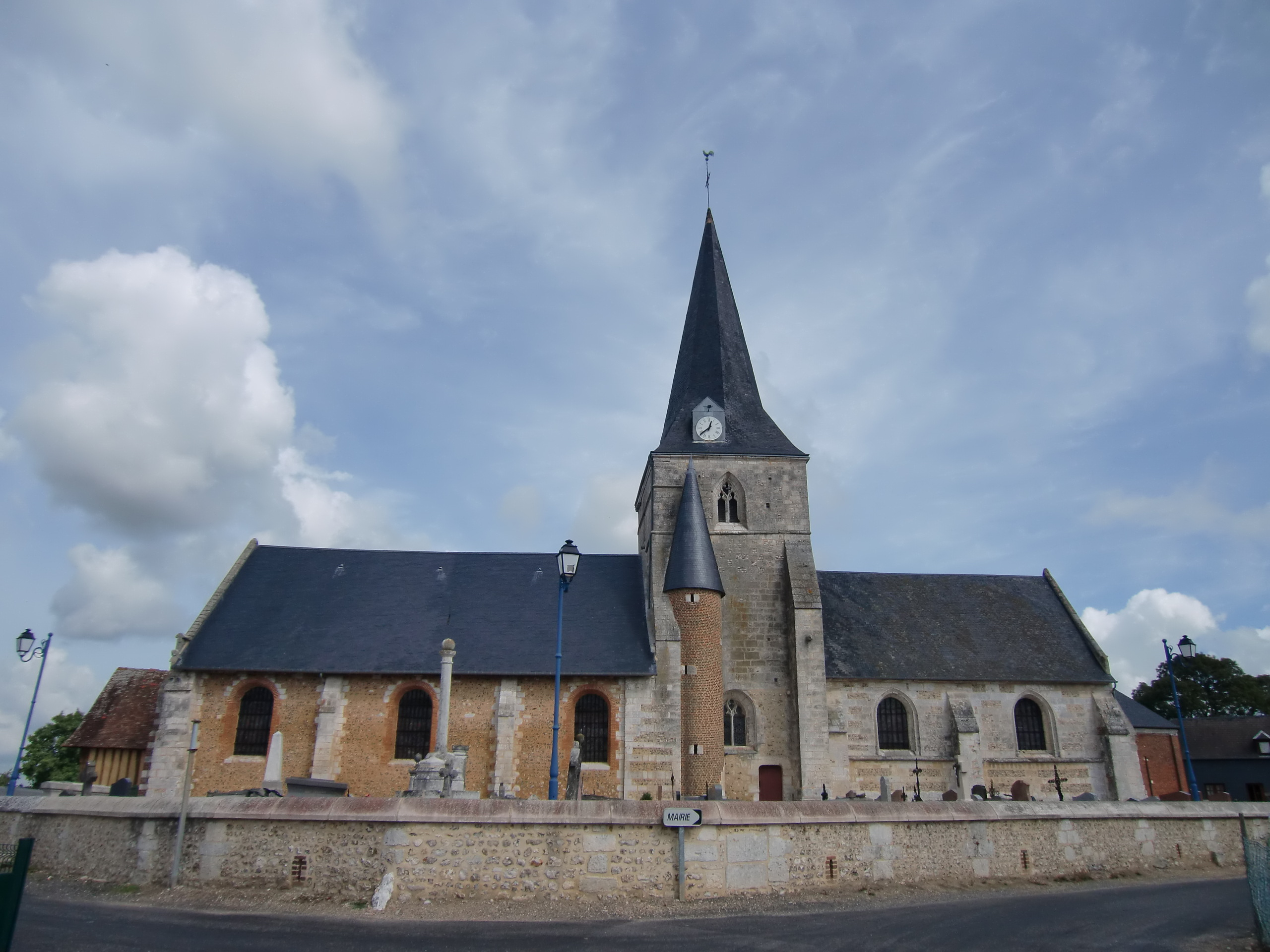
- The church in Rougemontier

- Coat of arms
- Location of Rougemontier
- Location within France Location within Normandy
- Coordinates: 49°21′34″N 0°43′18″E
- Country: France
- Region: Normandy
- Department: Eure
- Arrondissement: Bernay
- Canton: Bourg-Achard

Government
  - Mayor (2020–2026): Philippe Robillot
- Area^{1}: 11.96 km^{2} (4.62 sq mi)
- Elevation: 133 m (436 ft)
- Highest elevation: 144 m (472 ft)
- Lowest elevation: 70 m (230 ft)
- Population (2023): 1,032
  - Density: 86.29/km^{2} (223.5/sq mi)
- Time zone: UTC+01:00 (CET)
  - Summer (DST): UTC+02:00 (CEST)
- INSEE/Postal code: 27497 /27350
- ^{1} French Land Register data, which excludes lakes, ponds, glaciers > 1 km^{2} (0.386 sq mi or 247 acres) and river estuaries.

Rougemontier (before 2025: Rougemontiers, French pronunciation: [ʁuʒmɔ̃tje]) is a commune in the Eure department in northern France.

== Population ==
Historical population
Year	Pop.	±% p.a.
1968	484	—
1975	562	+2.16%
1982	785	+4.89%
1990	762	−0.37%
1999	752	−0.15%
2007	850	+1.54%
2012	957	+2.40%
2017	1,058	+2.03%
2023	1,032	−0.41%
Source: INSEE

== See also ==
- Communes of the Eure department
