= Barneville-sur-Seine =

- Commune
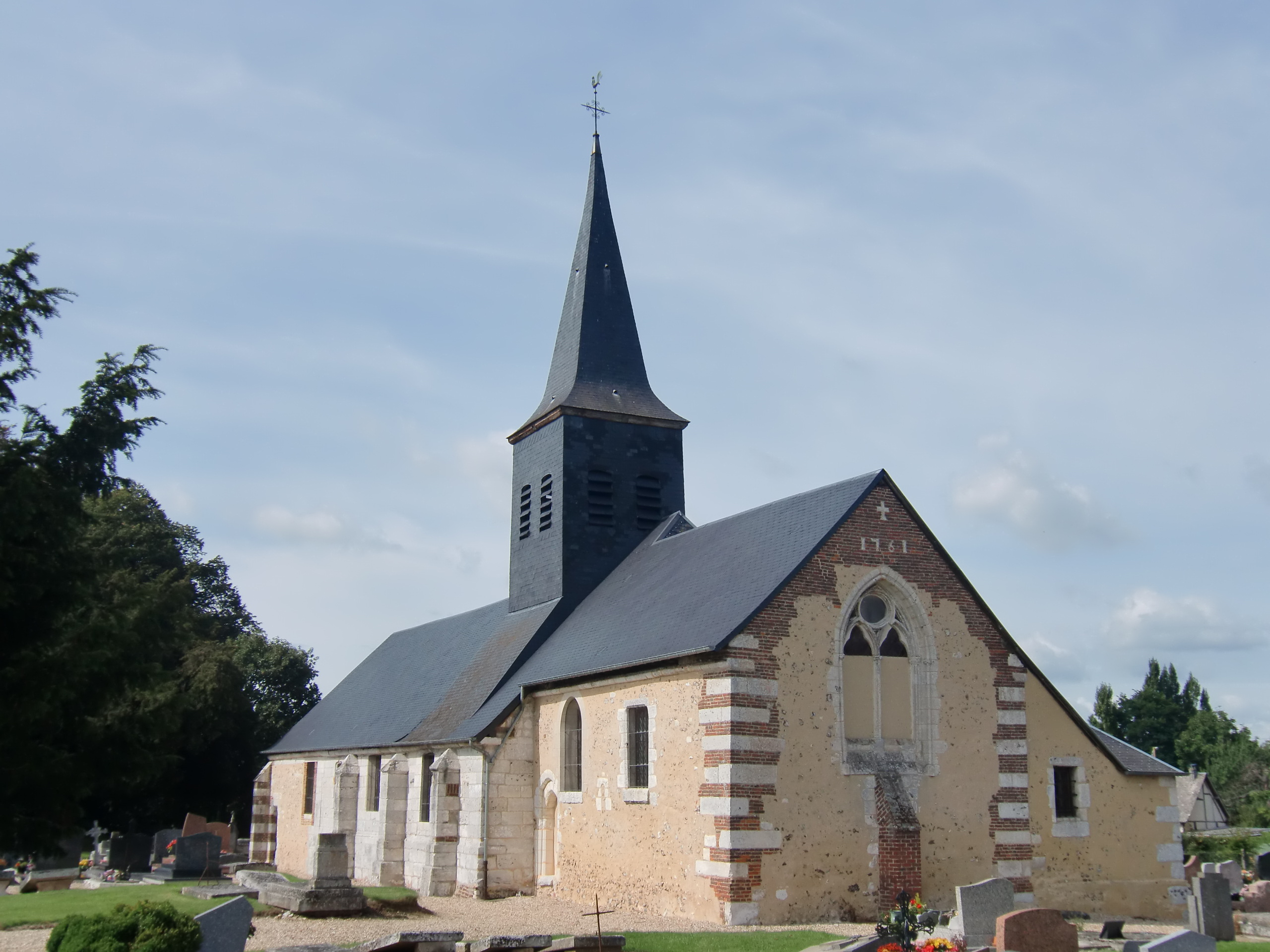
- The church in Barneville-sur-Seine
- Location of Barneville-sur-Seine
- Location within France Location within Normandy
- Coordinates: 49°22′53″N 0°50′49″E
- Country: France
- Region: Normandy
- Department: Eure
- Arrondissement: Bernay
- Canton: Bourg-Achard
- Intercommunality: Roumois Seine

Government
  - Mayor (2020–2026): José Maurice
- Area^{1}: 8.77 km^{2} (3.39 sq mi)
- Elevation: 124 m (407 ft)
- Highest elevation: 142 m (466 ft)
- Lowest elevation: 1 m (3.3 ft)
- Population (2023): 545
  - Density: 62.1/km^{2} (161/sq mi)
- Time zone: UTC+01:00 (CET)
  - Summer (DST): UTC+02:00 (CEST)
- INSEE/Postal code: 27039 /27310
- ^{1} French Land Register data, which excludes lakes, ponds, glaciers > 1 km^{2} (0.386 sq mi or 247 acres) and river estuaries.

Barneville-sur-Seine (French pronunciation: [baʁnəvil syʁ sɛn], literally Barneville on Seine) is a commune in the Eure department in Normandy in northern France.

== Population ==
Historical population
Year	Pop.	±% p.a.
1968	328	—
1975	340	+0.51%
1982	419	+3.03%
1990	427	+0.24%
1999	411	−0.42%
2007	461	+1.45%
2012	480	+0.81%
2017	511	+1.26%
2023	545	+1.08%
Source: INSEE

== See also ==
- Communes of the Eure department
