= La Haye-Aubrée =

- Commune
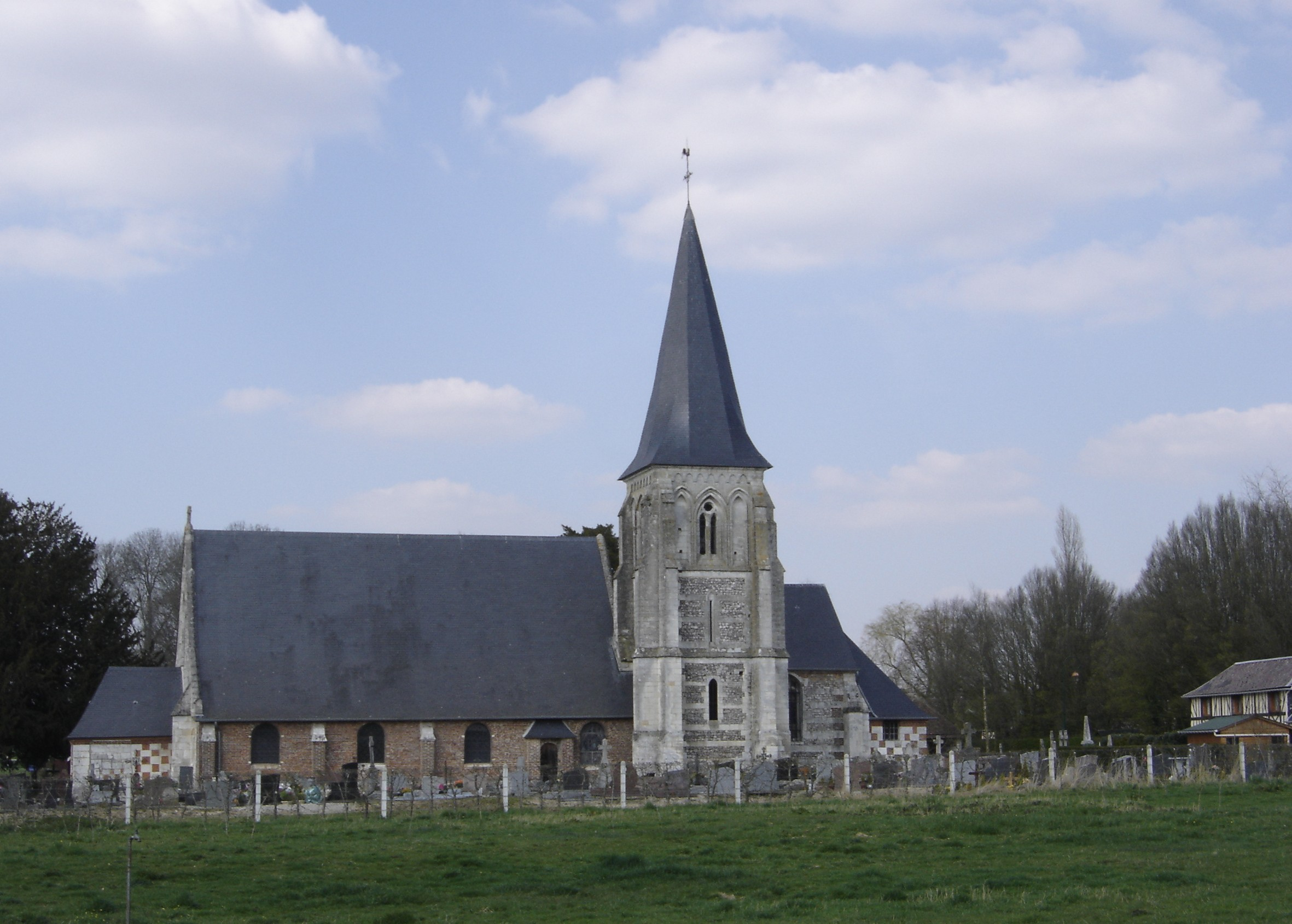
- The church of Saint-Léger in La Haye-Aubrée
- Location of La Haye-Aubrée
- Location within France Location within Normandy
- Coordinates: 49°23′20″N 0°41′38″E
- Country: France
- Region: Normandy
- Department: Eure
- Arrondissement: Bernay
- Canton: Bourg-Achard

Government
  - Mayor (2020–2026): Alain Vivien
- Area^{1}: 7.5 km^{2} (2.9 sq mi)
- Elevation: 130 m (430 ft)
- Highest elevation: 138 m (453 ft)
- Lowest elevation: 65 m (213 ft)
- Population (2023): 402
  - Density: 54/km^{2} (140/sq mi)
- Time zone: UTC+01:00 (CET)
  - Summer (DST): UTC+02:00 (CEST)
- INSEE/Postal code: 27317 /27350
- ^{1} French Land Register data, which excludes lakes, ponds, glaciers > 1 km^{2} (0.386 sq mi or 247 acres) and river estuaries.

La Haye-Aubrée (French pronunciation: [la ɛ obʁe]) is a commune in the Eure department in northern France.

== Population ==
Historical population
Year	Pop.	±% p.a.
1968	292	—
1975	310	+0.86%
1982	346	+1.58%
1990	381	+1.21%
1999	406	+0.71%
2007	416	+0.30%
2012	457	+1.90%
2017	462	+0.22%
2023	402	−2.29%
Source: INSEE

== See also ==
- Communes of the Eure department
