= Bourg-Achard =

- Commune
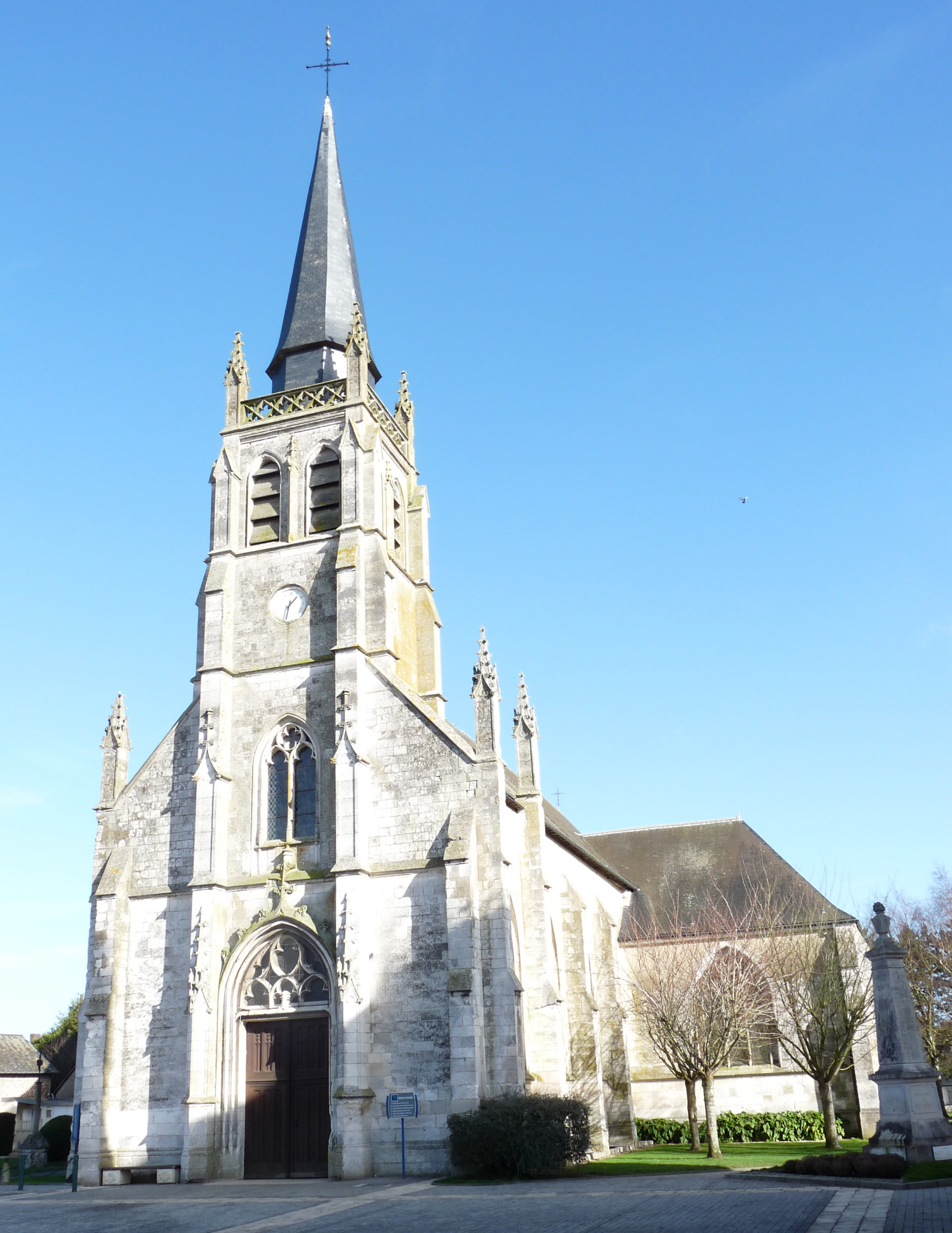
- The church in Bourg-Achard

- Coat of arms
- Location of Bourg-Achard
- Location within France Location within Normandy
- Coordinates: 49°21′22″N 0°49′06″E
- Country: France
- Region: Normandy
- Department: Eure
- Arrondissement: Bernay
- Canton: Bourg-Achard

Government
  - Mayor (2020–2026): Josette Simon
- Area^{1}: 12.32 km^{2} (4.76 sq mi)
- Elevation: 142 m (466 ft)
- Highest elevation: 144 m (472 ft)
- Lowest elevation: 94 m (308 ft)
- Population (2023): 4,026
  - Density: 326.8/km^{2} (846.4/sq mi)
- Time zone: UTC+01:00 (CET)
  - Summer (DST): UTC+02:00 (CEST)
- INSEE/Postal code: 27103 /27310
- ^{1} French Land Register data, which excludes lakes, ponds, glaciers > 1 km^{2} (0.386 sq mi or 247 acres) and river estuaries.

Bourg-Achard (French pronunciation: [buʁ aʃaʁ]) is a commune in the Eure department in the Normandy region in northern France.

== Geography ==
It is situated in the Roumois region of Normandy and sits at the junction of the motorways A13 (Paris-Caen) and A28 (Rouen-Le Mans), 150 km (93 mi) from Paris.

== Population ==
Historical population
Year	Pop.	±% p.a.
1968	1,564	—
1975	1,793	+1.97%
1982	2,009	+1.64%
1990	2,255	+1.45%
1999	2,517	+1.23%
2007	2,822	+1.44%
2012	3,066	+1.67%
2017	3,947	+5.18%
2023	4,026	+0.33%
Source: INSEE

== See also ==
- Communes of the Eure department
