= La Trinité-de-Thouberville =

- Commune
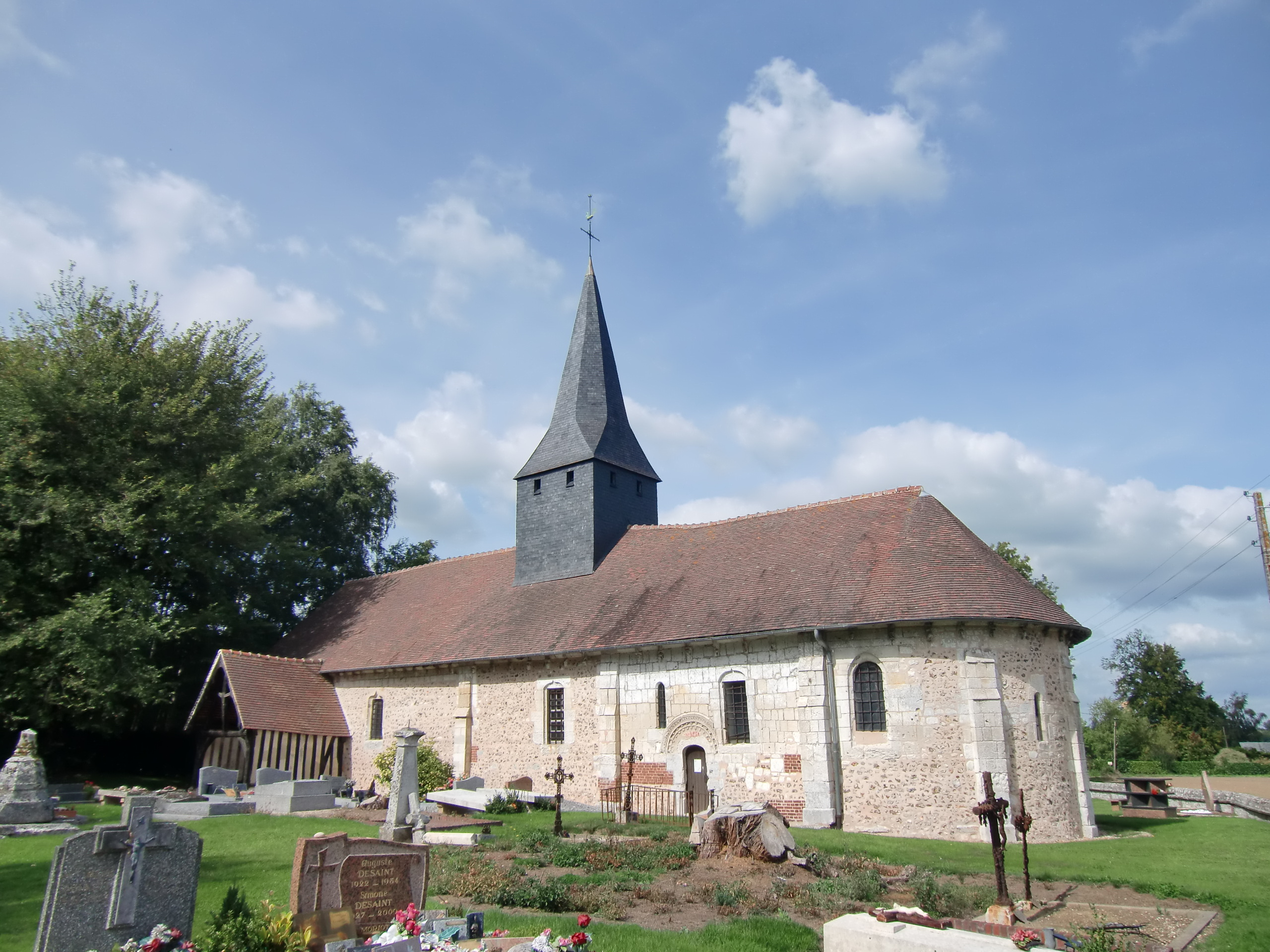
- The church in La Trinité-de-Thouberville
- Location of La Trinité-de-Thouberville
- Location within France Location within Normandy
- Coordinates: 49°21′39″N 0°52′45″E
- Country: France
- Region: Normandy
- Department: Eure
- Arrondissement: Bernay
- Canton: Bourg-Achard

Government
  - Mayor (2020–2026): Jacques Dorléans
- Area^{1}: 3.33 km^{2} (1.29 sq mi)
- Elevation: 142 m (466 ft)
- Highest elevation: 138 m (453 ft)
- Lowest elevation: 47 m (154 ft)
- Population (2023): 409
  - Density: 123/km^{2} (318/sq mi)
- Time zone: UTC+01:00 (CET)
  - Summer (DST): UTC+02:00 (CEST)
- INSEE/Postal code: 27661 /27310
- ^{1} French Land Register data, which excludes lakes, ponds, glaciers > 1 km^{2} (0.386 sq mi or 247 acres) and river estuaries.

La Trinité-de-Thouberville is a commune in the Eure department in Normandy in north-western France.

== Population ==
Historical population
Year	Pop.	±% p.a.
1968	160	—
1975	276	+8.10%
1982	335	+2.81%
1990	323	−0.45%
1999	386	+2.00%
2007	419	+1.03%
2012	445	+1.21%
2017	432	−0.59%
2023	409	−0.91%
Source: INSEE

== See also ==
- Communes of the Eure department
