= Aizier =

- Commune
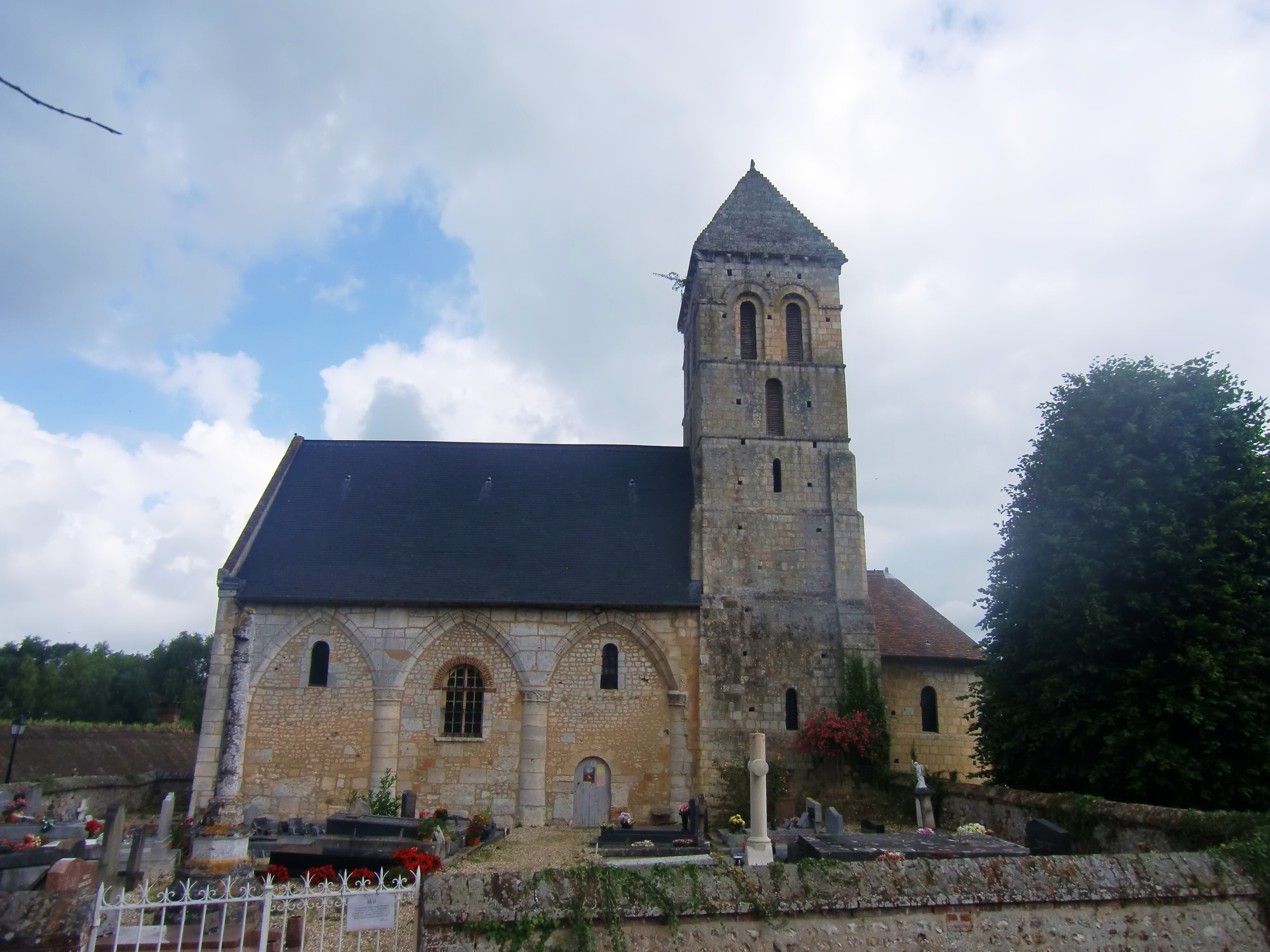
- The church in Aizier

- Coat of arms
- Location of Aizier
- Location within France Location within Normandy
- Coordinates: 49°25′52″N 0°37′38″E
- Country: France
- Region: Normandy
- Department: Eure
- Arrondissement: Bernay
- Canton: Bourg-Achard
- Intercommunality: Roumois Seine

Government
  - Mayor (2020–2026): Arnaud Maupoint
- Area^{1}: 2.36 km^{2} (0.91 sq mi)
- Elevation: 27 m (89 ft)
- Highest elevation: 117 m (384 ft)
- Lowest elevation: 0 m (0 ft)
- Population (2023): 158
  - Density: 66.9/km^{2} (173/sq mi)
- Time zone: UTC+01:00 (CET)
  - Summer (DST): UTC+02:00 (CEST)
- INSEE/Postal code: 27006 /27500
- ^{1} French Land Register data, which excludes lakes, ponds, glaciers > 1 km^{2} (0.386 sq mi or 247 acres) and river estuaries.

Aizier (French pronunciation: [ɛzje]) is a commune in the Eure department in Normandy in northern France.

== Population ==
Historical population
Year	Pop.	±% p.a.
1968	112	—
1975	104	−1.05%
1982	117	+1.70%
1990	113	−0.43%
1999	127	+1.31%
2007	112	−1.56%
2012	134	+3.65%
2017	137	+0.44%
2023	158	+2.41%
Source: INSEE

== See also ==
- Communes of the Eure department
