= Tocqueville, Eure =

Tocqueville
- Commune
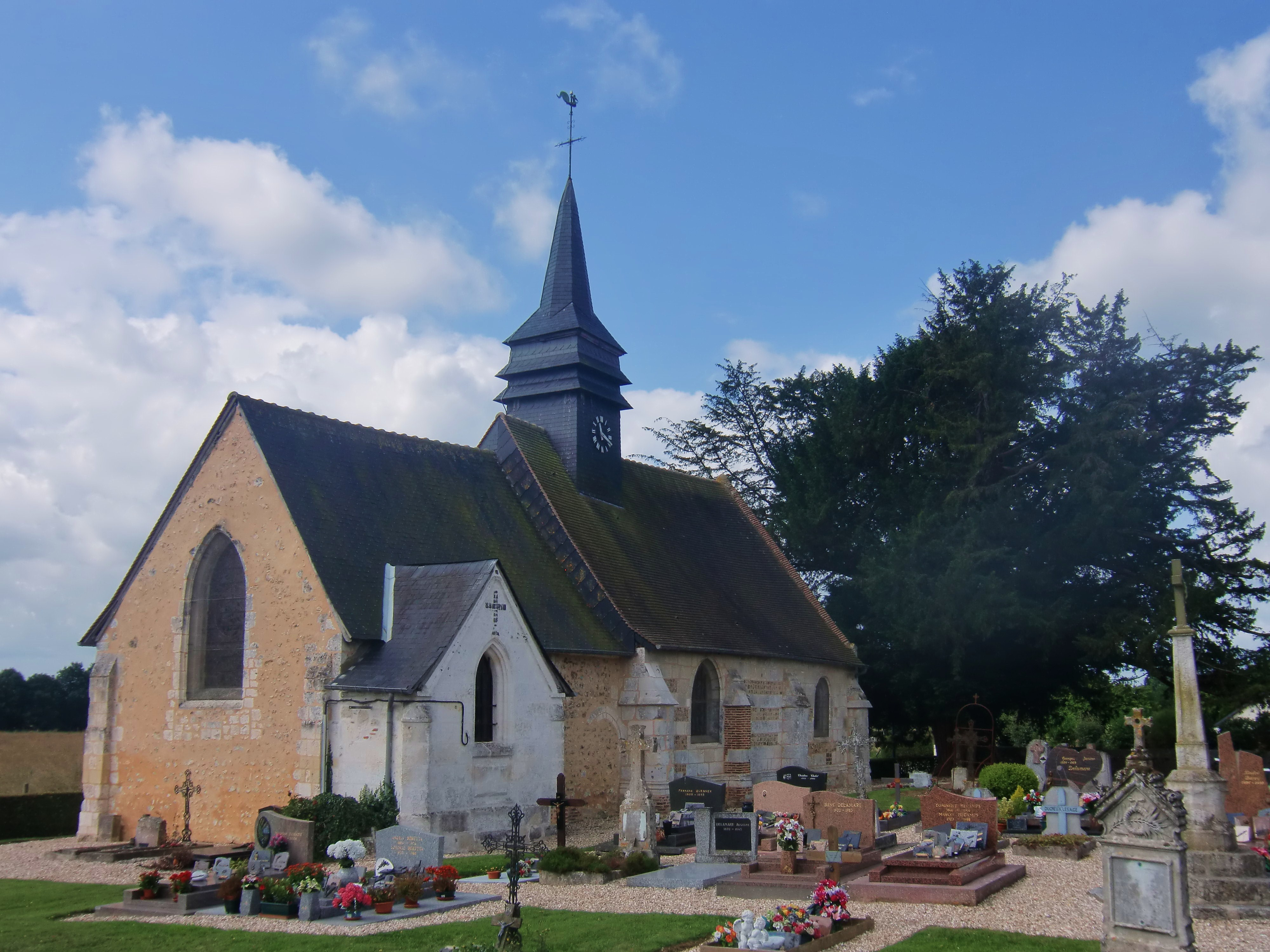
- The church in Tocqueville
- Location of Tocqueville
- Location within France Location within Normandy
- Coordinates: 49°24′32″N 0°36′37″E
- Country: France
- Region: Normandy
- Department: Eure
- Arrondissement: Bernay
- Canton: Bourg-Achard

Government
  - Mayor (2022–2026): Didier Derly
- Area^{1}: 2.48 km^{2} (0.96 sq mi)
- Elevation: 125 m (410 ft)
- Highest elevation: 134 m (440 ft)
- Lowest elevation: 65 m (213 ft)
- Population (2023): 140
  - Density: 56/km^{2} (150/sq mi)
- Time zone: UTC+01:00 (CET)
  - Summer (DST): UTC+02:00 (CEST)
- INSEE/Postal code: 27645 /27500
- ^{1} French Land Register data, which excludes lakes, ponds, glaciers > 1 km^{2} (0.386 sq mi or 247 acres) and river estuaries.

Tocqueville (French pronunciation: [tɔkvil]) is a commune in the Eure department in Normandy in northern France.

== Population ==
Historical population
Year	Pop.	±% p.a.
1968	93	—
1975	127	+4.55%
1982	121	−0.69%
1990	143	+2.11%
1999	131	−0.97%
2007	119	−1.19%
2012	139	+3.16%
2017	155	+2.20%
2023	140	−1.68%
Source: INSEE

== See also ==
- Communes of the Eure department
