= Saint-Samson-de-la-Roque =

- Commune
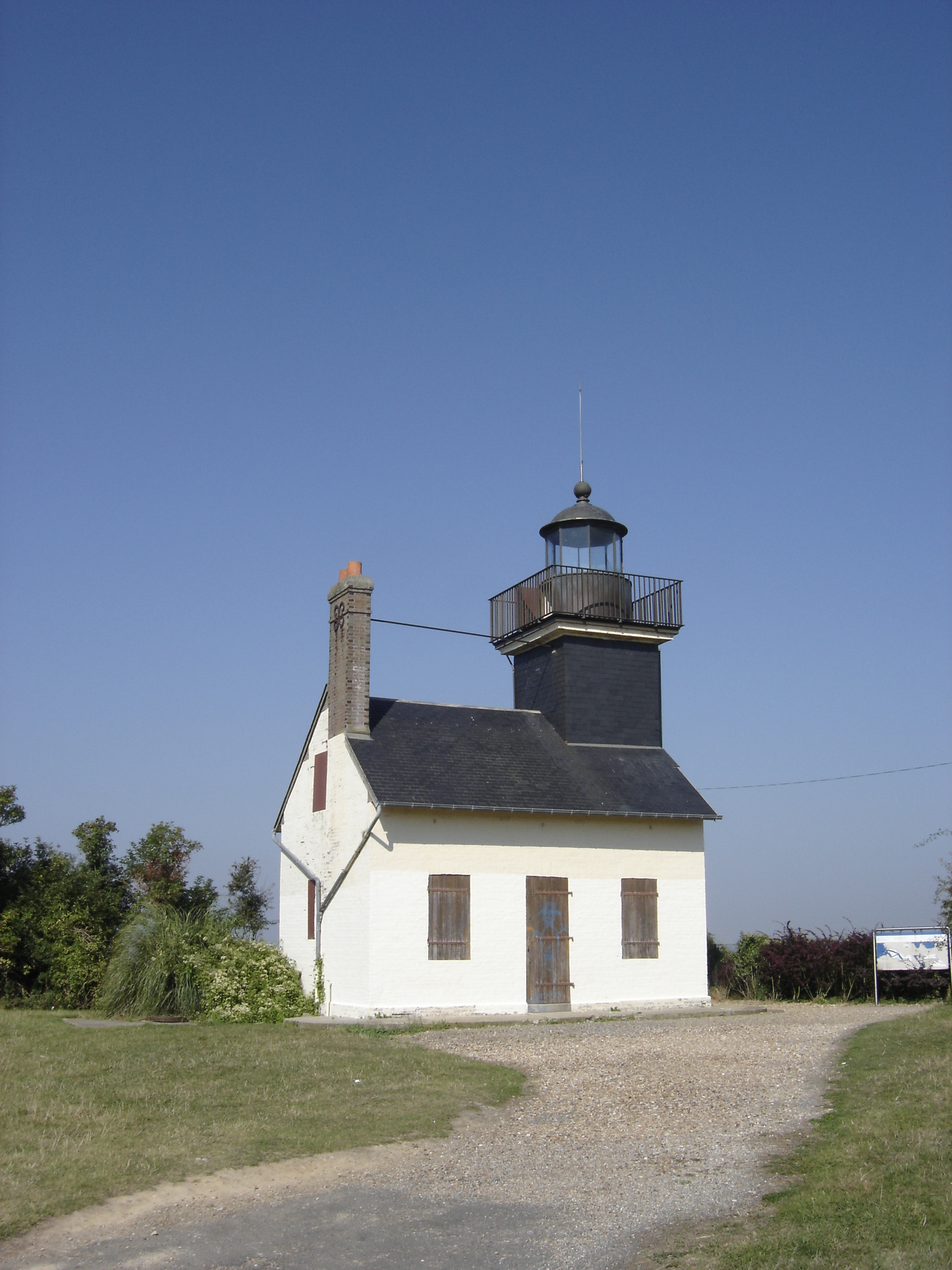
- La Roque lighthouse
- Location of Saint-Samson-de-la-Roque
- Location within France Location within Normandy
- Coordinates: 49°25′43″N 0°25′54″E
- Country: France
- Region: Normandy
- Department: Eure
- Arrondissement: Bernay
- Canton: Bourg-Achard

Government
  - Mayor (2020–2026): Régis Seninck
- Area^{1}: 15.69 km^{2} (6.06 sq mi)
- Elevation: 65 m (213 ft)
- Highest elevation: 114 m (374 ft)
- Lowest elevation: 0 m (0 ft)
- Population (2023): 436
  - Density: 27.8/km^{2} (72.0/sq mi)
- Time zone: UTC+01:00 (CET)
  - Summer (DST): UTC+02:00 (CEST)
- INSEE/Postal code: 27601 /27680
- ^{1} French Land Register data, which excludes lakes, ponds, glaciers > 1 km^{2} (0.386 sq mi or 247 acres) and river estuaries.

Saint-Samson-de-la-Roque (French pronunciation: [sɛ̃ sɑ̃sɔ̃ də la ʁɔk]) is a commune in the Eure department in Normandy in northern France.

== Population ==
Historical population
Year	Pop.	±% p.a.
1968	278	—
1975	288	+0.51%
1982	292	+0.20%
1990	271	−0.93%
1999	283	+0.48%
2007	329	+1.90%
2012	397	+3.83%
2017	436	+1.89%
2023	436	+0.00%
Source: INSEE

== See also ==
- Communes of the Eure department
