= Bouquelon =

- Commune
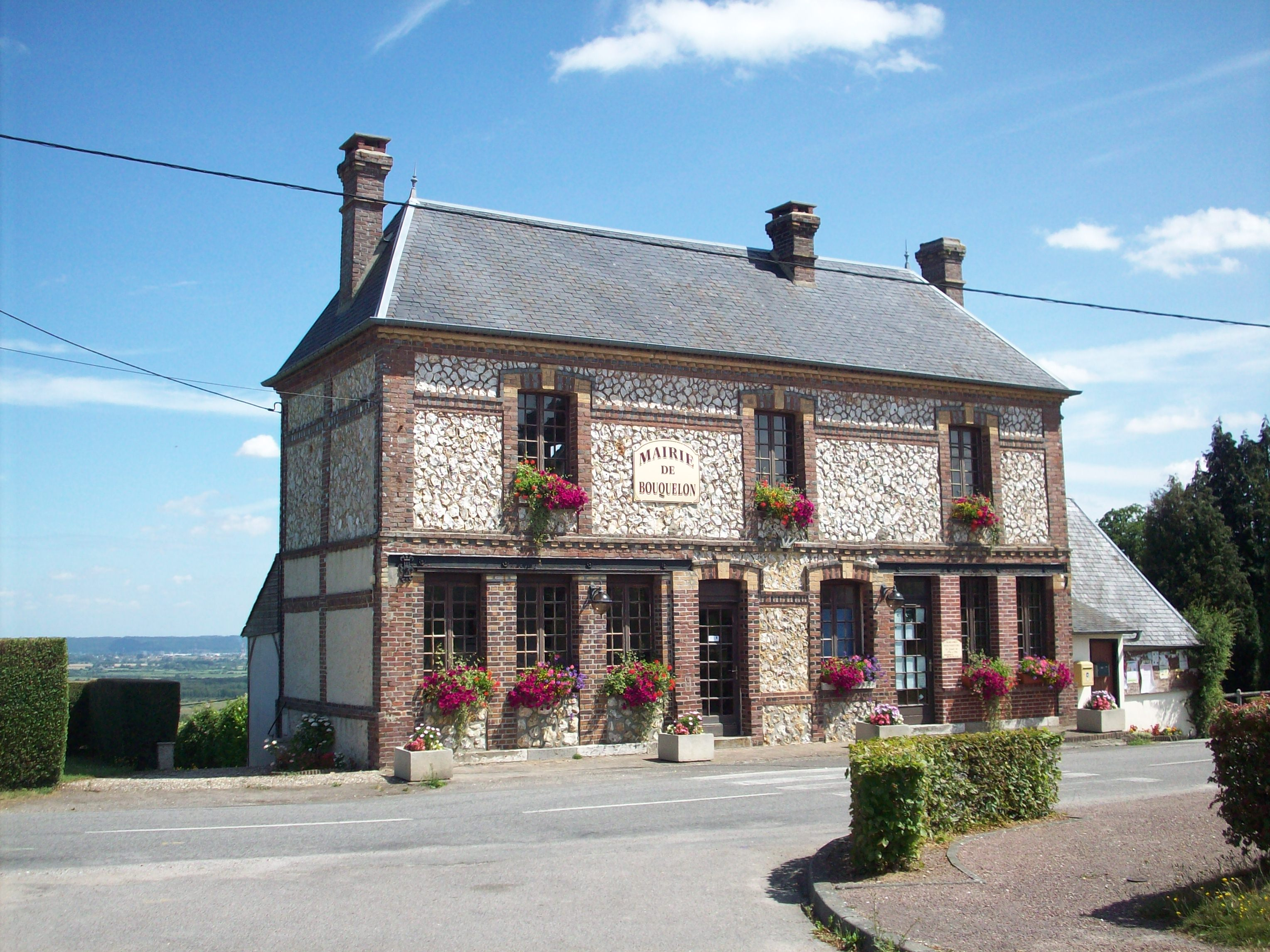
- The town hall in Bouquelon
- Location of Bouquelon
- Location within France Location within Normandy
- Coordinates: 49°23′49″N 0°29′32″E
- Country: France
- Region: Normandy
- Department: Eure
- Arrondissement: Bernay
- Canton: Bourg-Achard

Government
  - Mayor (2020–2026): Dominique Boucher
- Area^{1}: 11.71 km^{2} (4.52 sq mi)
- Elevation: 90 m (300 ft)
- Highest elevation: 121 m (397 ft)
- Lowest elevation: 1 m (3.3 ft)
- Population (2023): 470
  - Density: 40/km^{2} (100/sq mi)
- Time zone: UTC+01:00 (CET)
  - Summer (DST): UTC+02:00 (CEST)
- INSEE/Postal code: 27101 /27500
- ^{1} French Land Register data, which excludes lakes, ponds, glaciers > 1 km^{2} (0.386 sq mi or 247 acres) and river estuaries.

Bouquelon (French pronunciation: [buklɔ̃]) is a commune in the Eure department in Normandy in northern France.

== Population ==
Historical population
Year	Pop.	±% p.a.
1968	258	—
1975	235	−1.33%
1982	225	−0.62%
1990	284	+2.95%
1999	295	+0.42%
2007	379	+3.18%
2012	417	+1.93%
2017	512	+4.19%
2023	470	−1.42%
Source: INSEE

== See also ==
- Communes of the Eure department
