= Sainte-Opportune-la-Mare =

- Commune
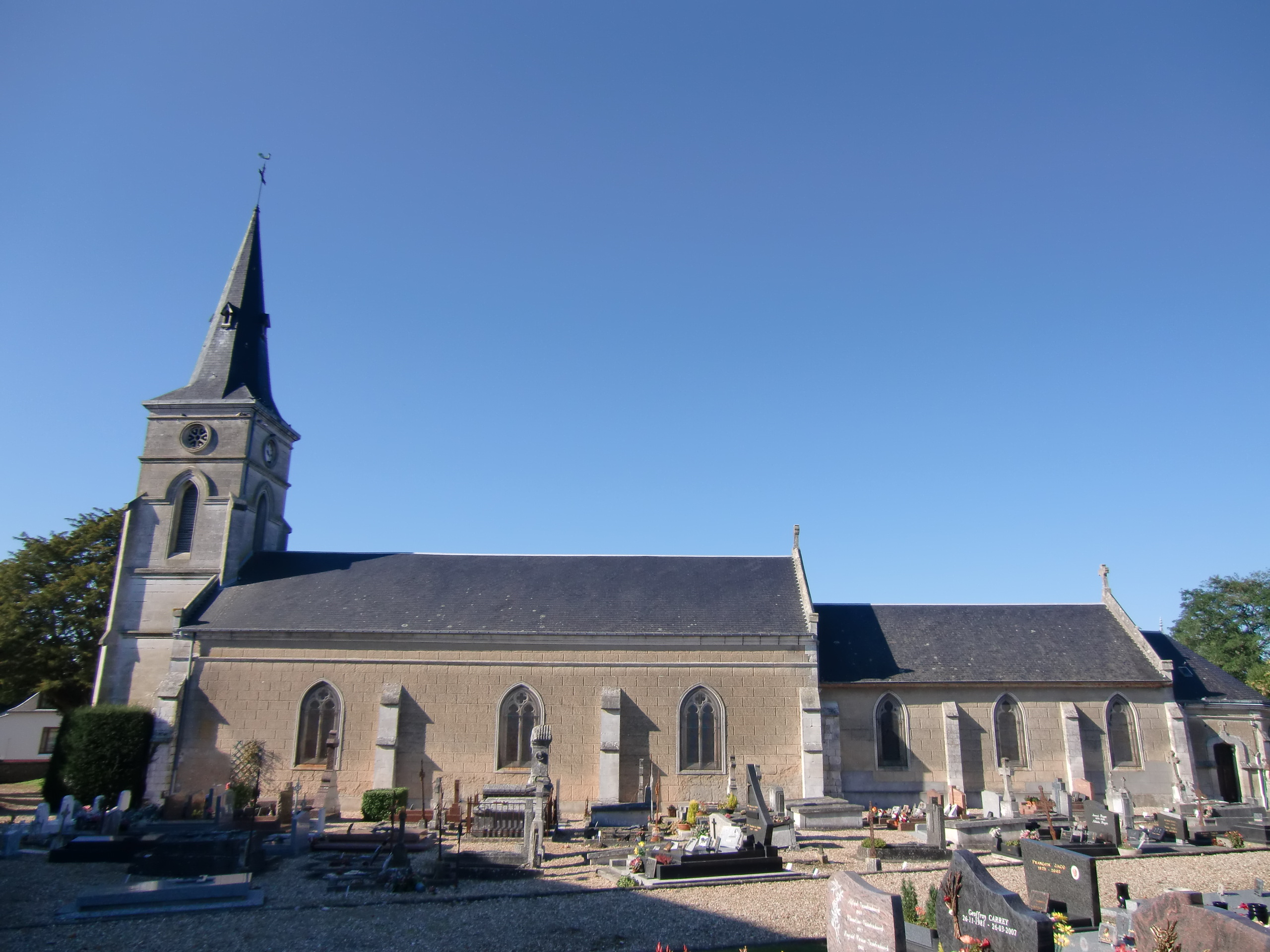
- The church in Sainte-Opportune-la-Mare
- Location of Sainte-Opportune-la-Mare
- Location within France Location within Normandy
- Coordinates: 49°25′03″N 0°32′38″E
- Country: France
- Region: Normandy
- Department: Eure
- Arrondissement: Bernay
- Canton: Bourg-Achard

Government
  - Mayor (2020–2026): Alain Michalot
- Area^{1}: 10.89 km^{2} (4.20 sq mi)
- Highest elevation: 128 m (420 ft)
- Lowest elevation: 1 m (3.3 ft)
- Population (2023): 427
  - Density: 39.2/km^{2} (102/sq mi)
- Time zone: UTC+01:00 (CET)
  - Summer (DST): UTC+02:00 (CEST)
- INSEE/Postal code: 27577 /27680
- ^{1} French Land Register data, which excludes lakes, ponds, glaciers > 1 km^{2} (0.386 sq mi or 247 acres) and river estuaries.

Sainte-Opportune-la-Mare is a commune in the Eure department in Normandy in northern France.

== Population ==
Historical population
Year	Pop.	±% p.a.
1968	252	—
1975	279	+1.46%
1982	339	+2.82%
1990	369	+1.07%
1999	385	+0.47%
2007	423	+1.18%
2012	443	+0.93%
2017	440	−0.14%
2023	427	−0.50%
Source: INSEE

== See also ==
- Communes of the Eure department
