= Canton of Bourg-Achard =

Canton of Eure department, France

Coordinates: 49.35°N 0.82°E

The canton of Bourg-Achard is an administrative division of the Eure department, northern France. It was created at the French canton reorganisation which came into effect in March 2015. Its seat is in Bourg-Achard.

It consists of the following communes:

1. Aizier
2. Barneville-sur-Seine
3. Bosgouet
4. Bouquelon
5. Bouquetot
6. Bourg-Achard
7. Bourneville-Sainte-Croix
8. Caumont
9. Cauverville-en-Roumois
10. Étréville
11. Éturqueraye
12. Hauville
13. La Haye-Aubrée
14. La Haye-de-Routot
15. Honguemare-Guenouville
16. Le Landin
17. Marais-Vernier
18. Quillebeuf-sur-Seine
19. Rougemontiers
20. Routot
21. Saint-Aubin-sur-Quillebeuf
22. Sainte-Opportune-la-Mare
23. Saint-Ouen-de-Thouberville
24. Saint-Samson-de-la-Roque
25. Tocqueville
26. La Trinité-de-Thouberville
27. Trouville-la-Haule
28. Valletot
29. Vieux-Port
