= Trouville-la-Haule =

- Commune
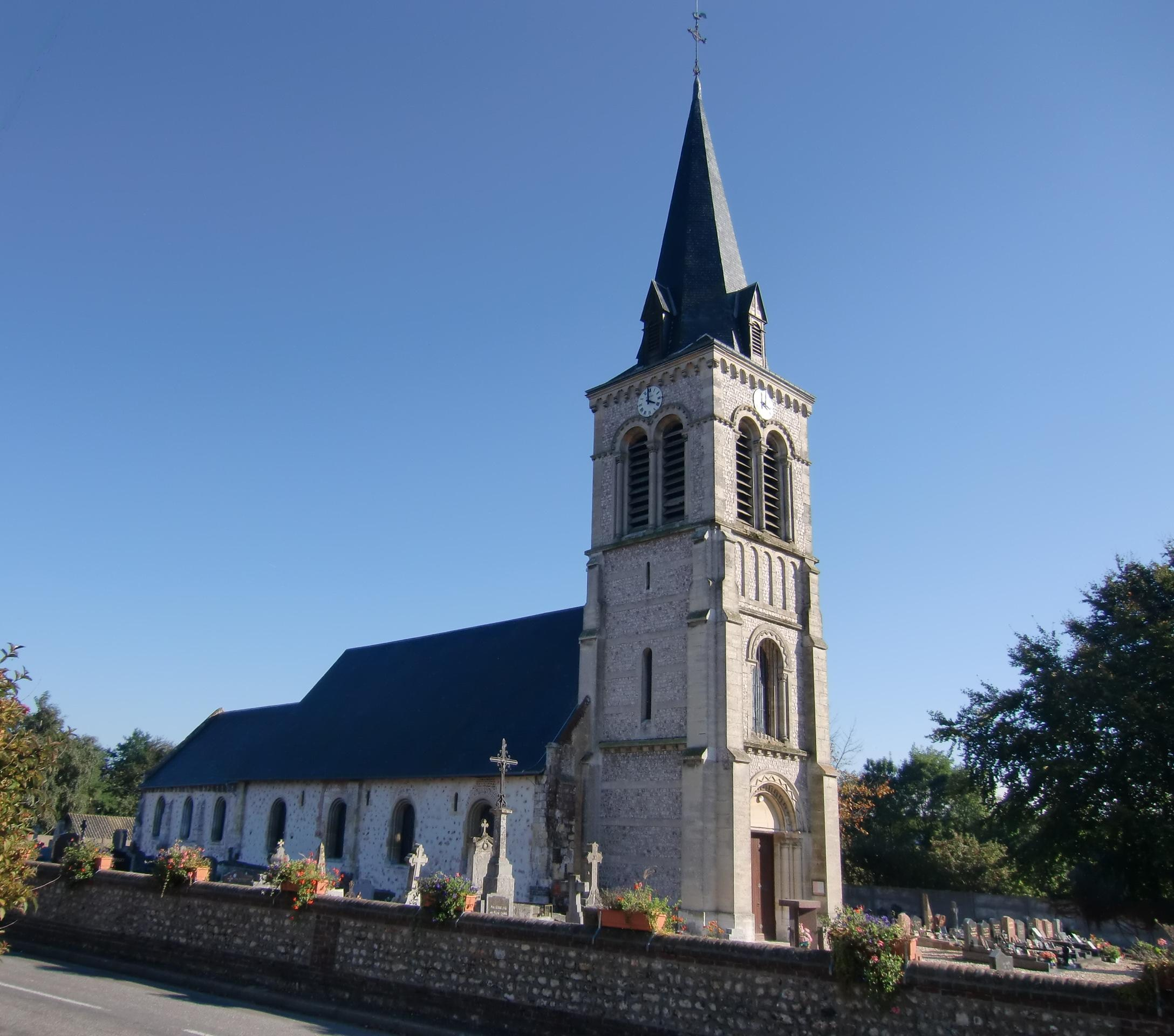
- The church in Trouville-la-Haule

- Coat of arms
- Location of Trouville-la-Haule
- Location within France Location within Normandy
- Coordinates: 49°25′11″N 0°34′34″E
- Country: France
- Region: Normandy
- Department: Eure
- Arrondissement: Bernay
- Canton: Bourg-Achard

Government
  - Mayor (2020–2026): Damien Mercier
- Area^{1}: 12.25 km^{2} (4.73 sq mi)
- Elevation: 127 m (417 ft)
- Highest elevation: 137 m (449 ft)
- Lowest elevation: 0 m (0 ft)
- Population (2023): 758
  - Density: 61.9/km^{2} (160/sq mi)
- Time zone: UTC+01:00 (CET)
  - Summer (DST): UTC+02:00 (CEST)
- INSEE/Postal code: 27665 /27680
- ^{1} French Land Register data, which excludes lakes, ponds, glaciers > 1 km^{2} (0.386 sq mi or 247 acres) and river estuaries.

Trouville-la-Haule (French pronunciation: [tʁuvil la ol]) is a commune in the Eure department in Normandy in northern France.

== Population ==
Historical population
Year	Pop.	±% p.a.
1968	571	—
1975	601	+0.73%
1982	623	+0.51%
1990	676	+1.03%
1999	646	−0.50%
2007	729	+1.52%
2012	774	+1.21%
2017	767	−0.18%
2023	758	−0.20%
Source: INSEE

== See also ==
- Communes of the Eure department
