= Vieux-Port =

- Commune
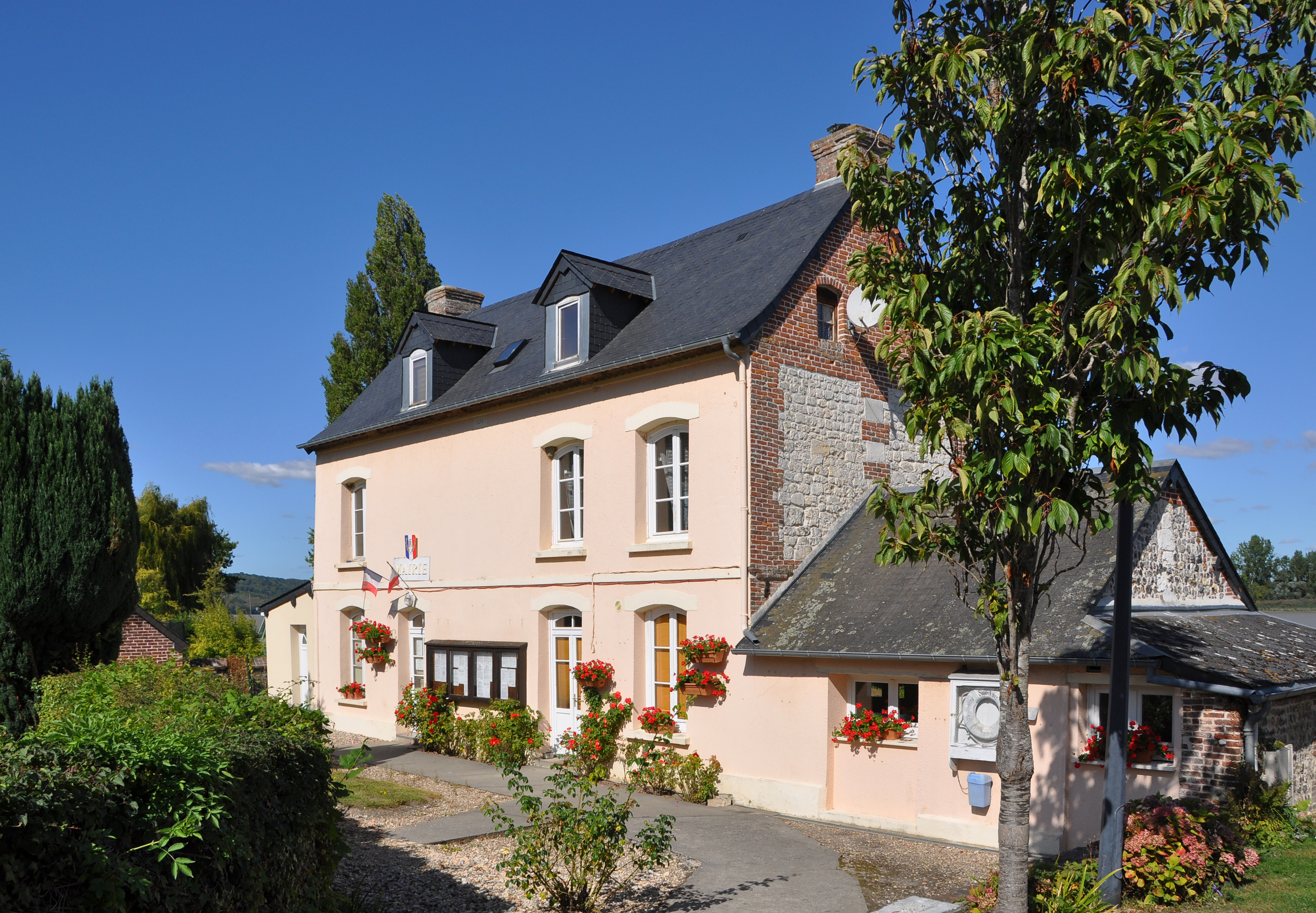
- Town hall of Vieux-Port
- Location of Vieux-Port
- Location within France Location within Normandy
- Coordinates: 49°25′36″N 0°36′30″E
- Country: France
- Region: Normandy
- Department: Eure
- Arrondissement: Bernay
- Canton: Bourg-Achard
- Intercommunality: Roumois Seine

Government
  - Mayor (2020–2026): Frédéric Cardon
- Area^{1}: 0.57 km^{2} (0.22 sq mi)
- Elevation: 12 m (39 ft)
- Highest elevation: 70 m (230 ft)
- Lowest elevation: 0 m (0 ft)
- Population (2023): 47
  - Density: 82/km^{2} (210/sq mi)
- Time zone: UTC+01:00 (CET)
  - Summer (DST): UTC+02:00 (CEST)
- INSEE/Postal code: 27686 /27680
- ^{1} French Land Register data, which excludes lakes, ponds, glaciers > 1 km^{2} (0.386 sq mi or 247 acres) and river estuaries.

Vieux-Port (French pronunciation: [vjø pɔʁ]) is a commune in the Eure department and Normandy region of France.

== Population ==
Historical population
Year	Pop.	±% p.a.
1968	76	—
1975	66	−2.00%
1982	56	−2.32%
1990	42	−3.53%
1999	58	+3.65%
2007	63	+1.04%
2012	53	−3.40%
2017	46	−2.79%
2023	47	+0.36%
Source: INSEE

== Gallery ==
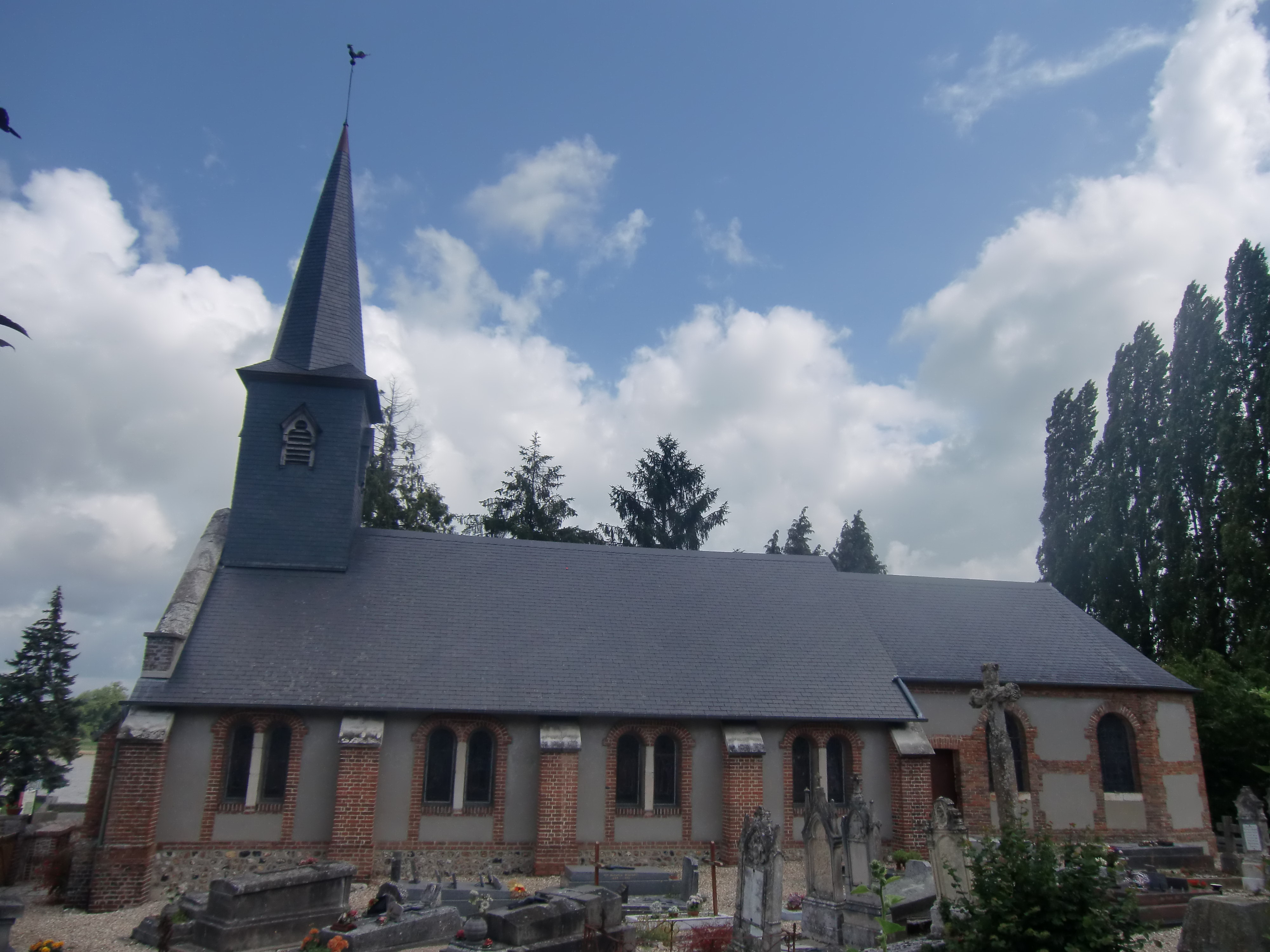
Saint-Michel church

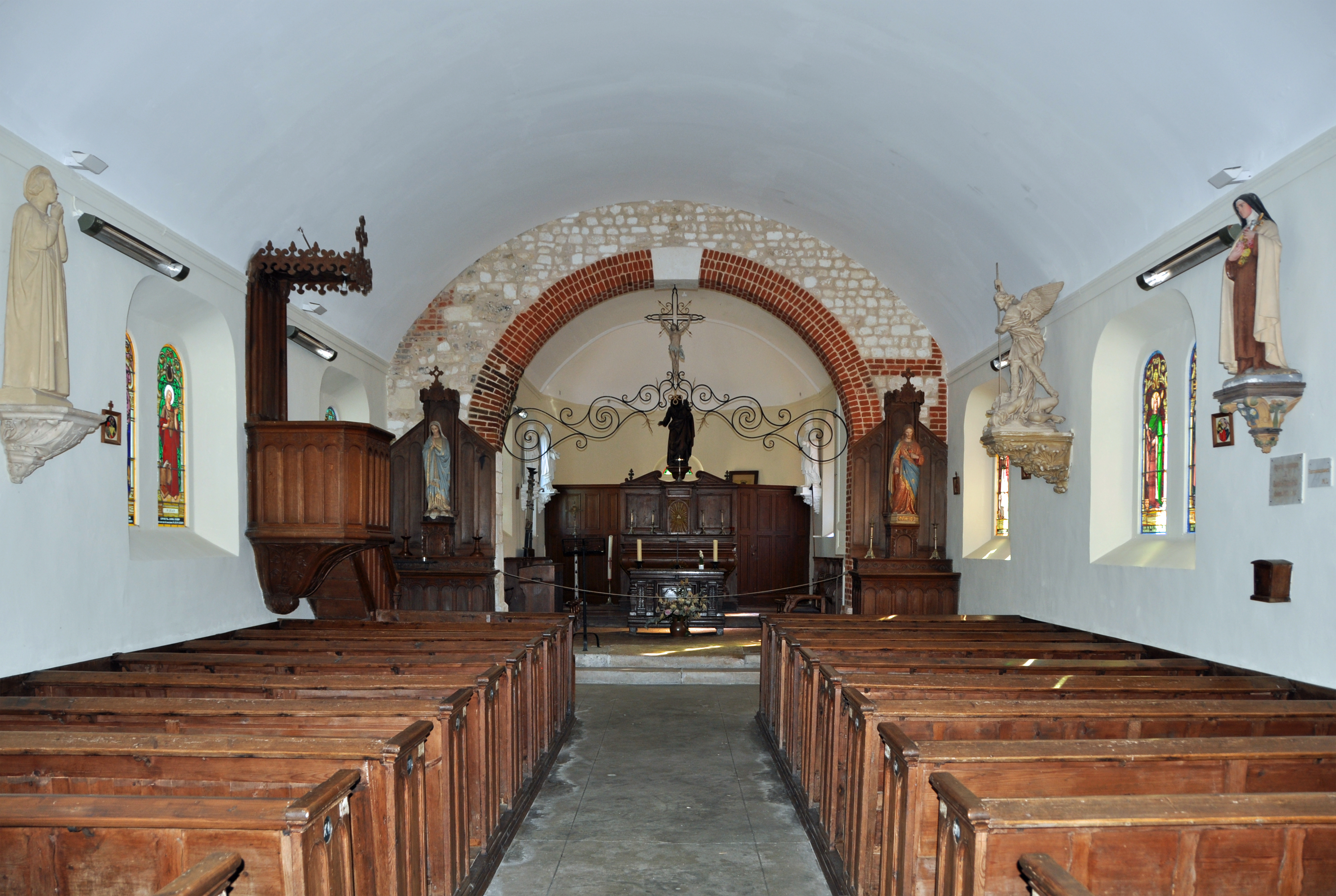
Interior of the church

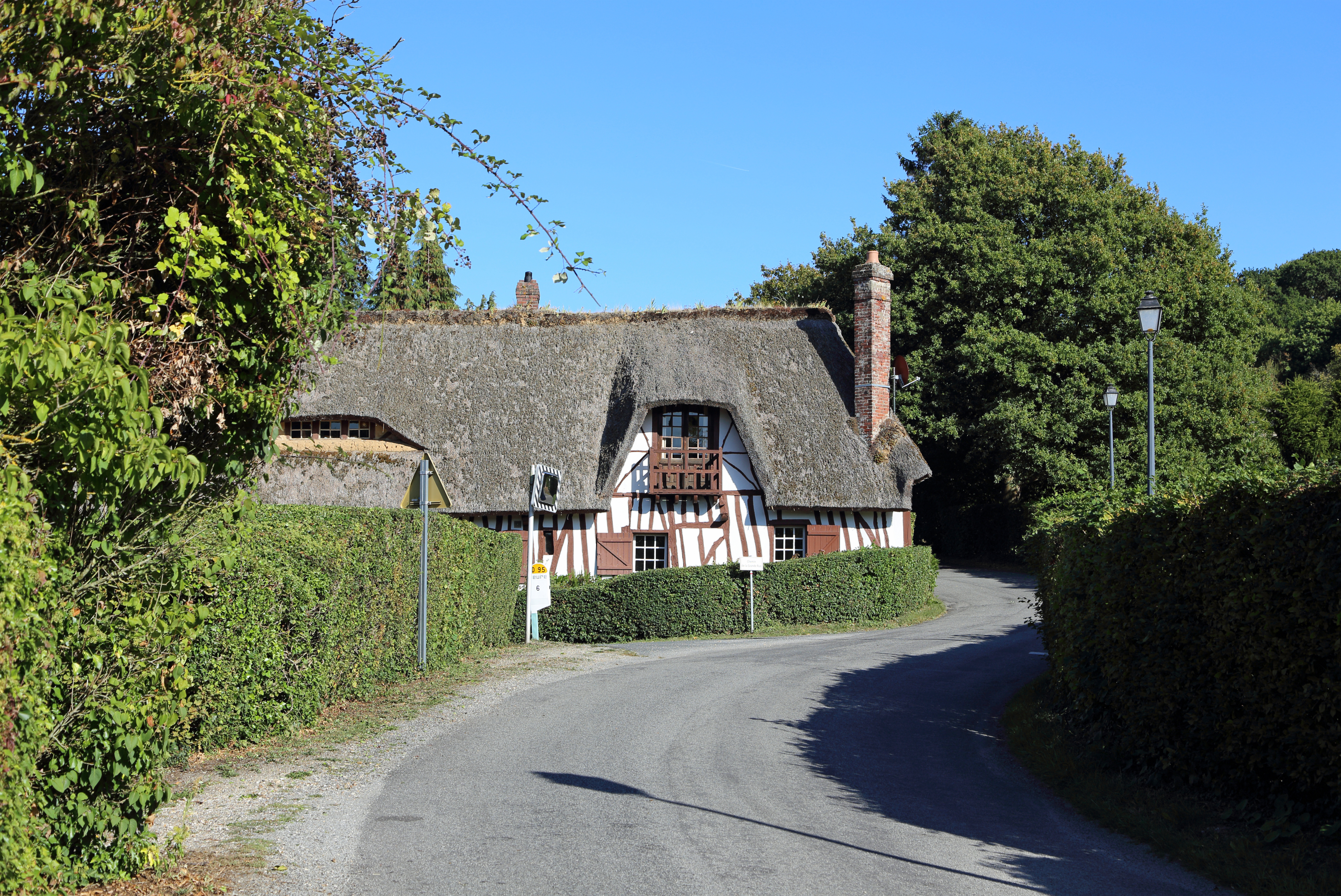
Main street

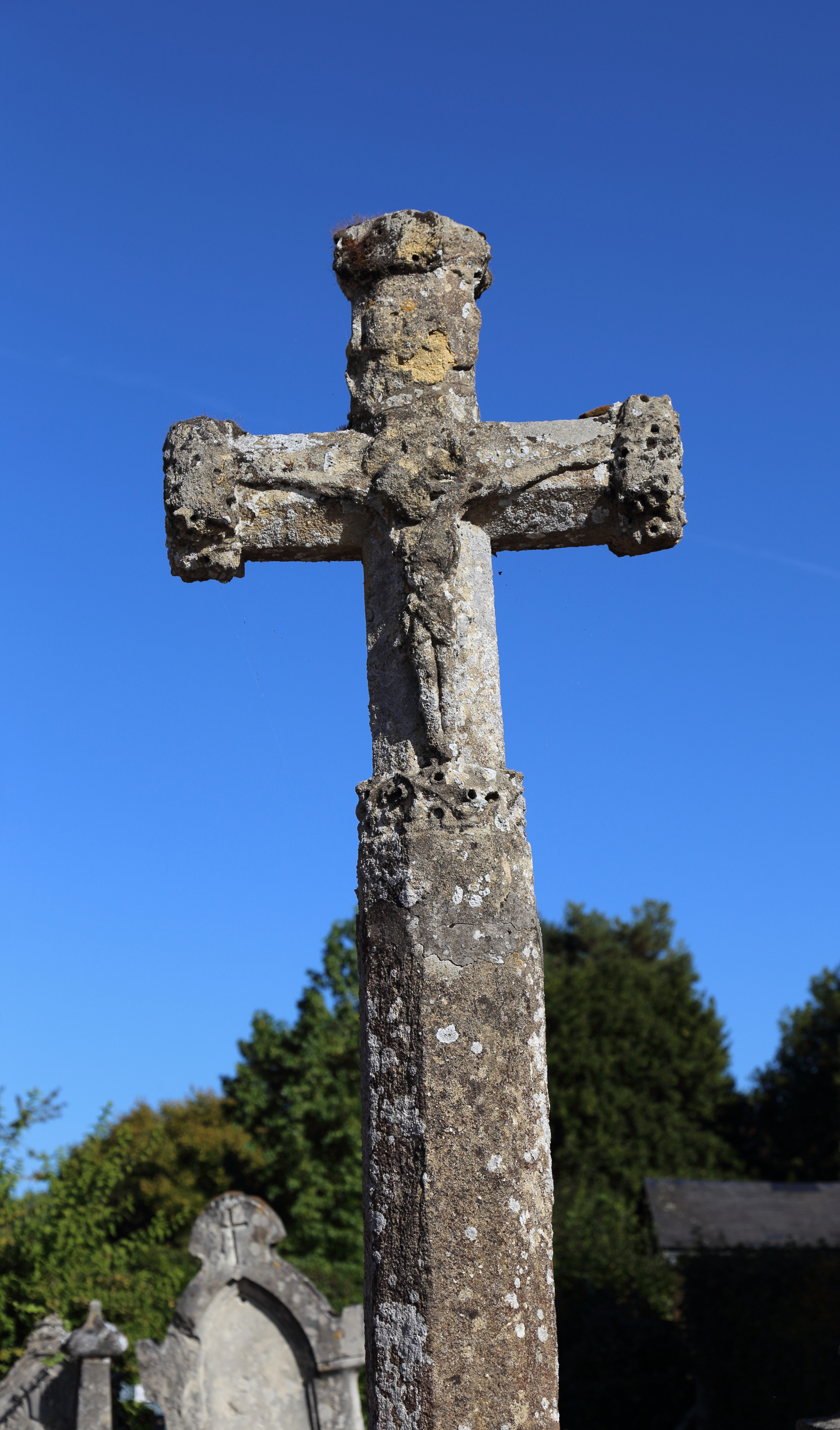
Cemetery cross

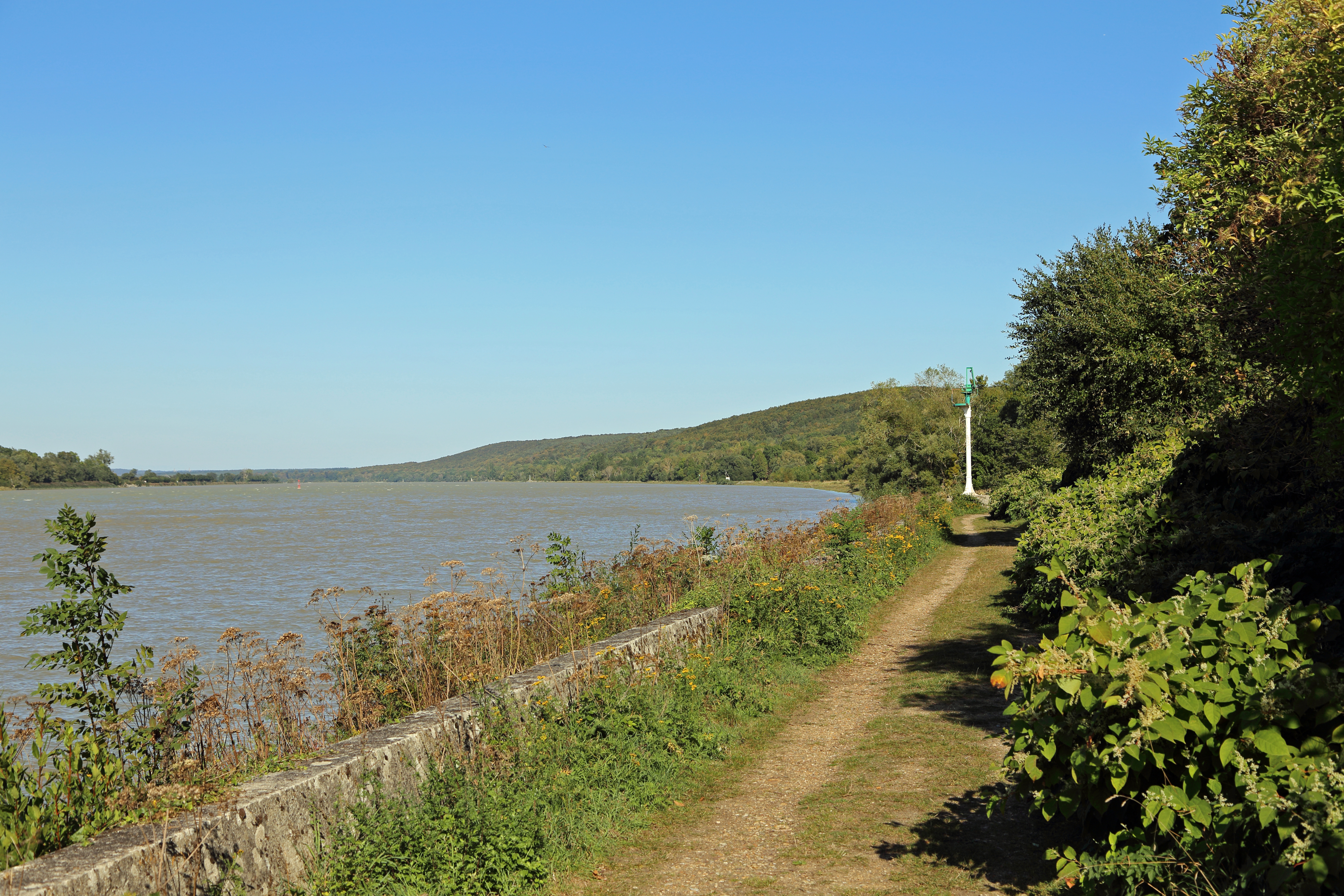
The Seine river at Vieux-Port

== See also ==
- Communes of the Eure department
