= Saint-Aubin-sur-Quillebeuf =

- Commune
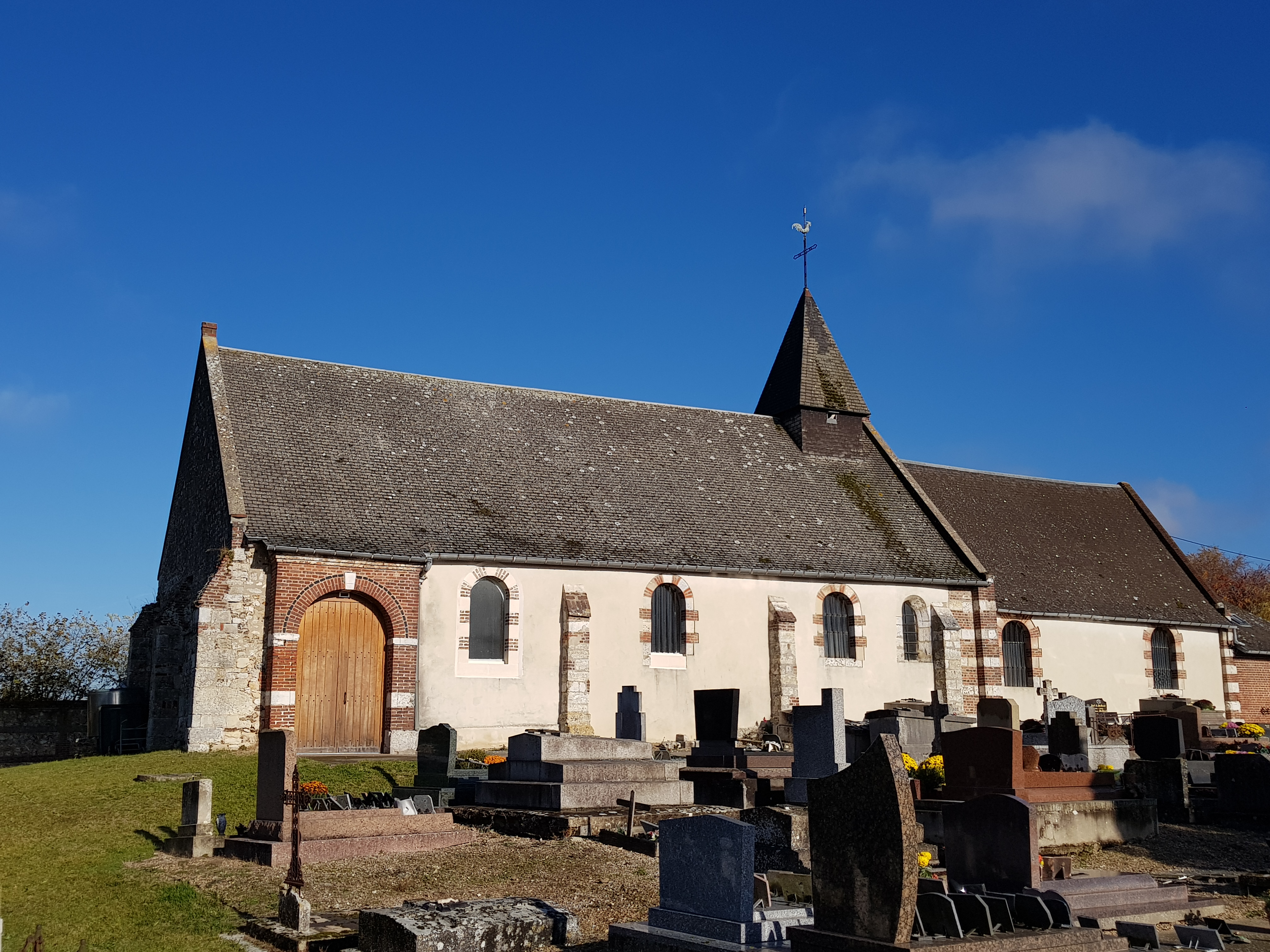
- The church in Saint-Aubin-sur-Quillebeuf
- Location of Saint-Aubin-sur-Quillebeuf
- Location within France Location within Normandy
- Coordinates: 49°27′47″N 0°31′38″E
- Country: France
- Region: Normandy
- Department: Eure
- Arrondissement: Bernay
- Canton: Bourg-Achard

Government
  - Mayor (2020–2026): Régine Seninck
- Area^{1}: 12.39 km^{2} (4.78 sq mi)
- Elevation: 11 m (36 ft)
- Highest elevation: 76 m (249 ft)
- Lowest elevation: 0 m (0 ft)
- Population (2023): 749
  - Density: 60.5/km^{2} (157/sq mi)
- Time zone: UTC+01:00 (CET)
  - Summer (DST): UTC+02:00 (CEST)
- INSEE/Postal code: 27518 /27680
- ^{1} French Land Register data, which excludes lakes, ponds, glaciers > 1 km^{2} (0.386 sq mi or 247 acres) and river estuaries.

Saint-Aubin-sur-Quillebeuf (French pronunciation: [sɛ̃.t‿obɛ̃ syʁ kijbœf], literally Saint-Aubin on Quillebeuf) is a commune in the Eure department in Normandy in northern France.

The village was formerly called Wambourg (Wamburgum 1025, Weneborch 1147) and Saint-Aubin-de-Vambourg. The name was Anglo-Saxon in origin.

== Population ==
Historical population
Year	Pop.	±% p.a.
1968	333	—
1975	375	+1.71%
1982	384	+0.34%
1990	424	+1.25%
1999	431	+0.18%
2007	570	+3.56%
2012	646	+2.53%
2017	716	+2.08%
2023	749	+0.75%
Source: INSEE

== See also ==
- Communes of the Eure department
