= Saussey =

Saussey may refer to the following communes in France:

- Saussey, Côte-d'Or, in the Côte-d'Or département
- Saussey, Manche, in the Manche département

== See also ==
- Saussay (disambiguation)
- La Saussaye, in the Eure département
