= Saussay =

Saussay may refer to the following communes in France:

- Saussay, Eure-et-Loir, in the Eure-et-Loir département
- Saussay, Seine-Maritime, in the Seine-Maritime département
- Saussay-la-Campagne, in the Eure département
- La Saussaye, in the Eure département

== See also ==
- Saussey (disambiguation)
