= Épreville-en-Roumois =

- Part of Flancourt-Crescy-en-Roumois
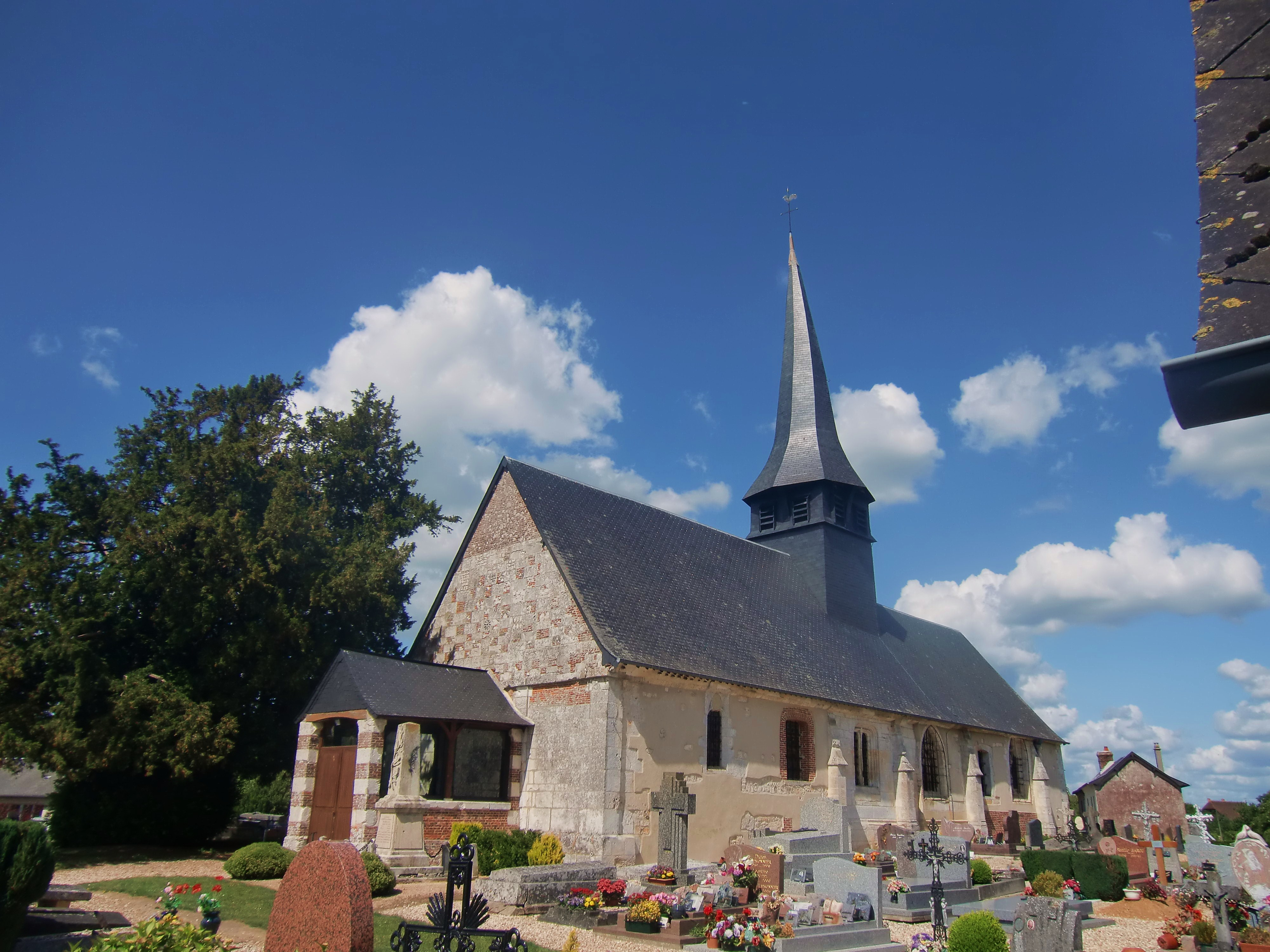
- Location of Épreville-en-Roumois
- Location within France Location within Normandy
- Coordinates: 49°19′18″N 0°46′23″E
- Country: France
- Region: Normandy
- Department: Eure
- Arrondissement: Bernay
- Canton: Bourgtheroulde-Infreville
- Commune: Flancourt-Crescy-en-Roumois
- Area^{1}: 6.65 km^{2} (2.57 sq mi)
- Elevation: 136 m (446 ft)
- Highest elevation: 148 m (486 ft)
- Lowest elevation: 114 m (374 ft)
- Population (2019): 561
  - Density: 84.4/km^{2} (218/sq mi)
- Time zone: UTC+01:00 (CET)
  - Summer (DST): UTC+02:00 (CEST)
- Postal code: 27310
- ^{1} French Land Register data, which excludes lakes, ponds, glaciers > 1 km^{2} (0.386 sq mi or 247 acres) and river estuaries.

Épreville-en-Roumois (French pronunciation: [epʁəvil ɑ̃ ʁumwa], literally Épreville in Roumois) is a former commune in the Eure department in the Normandy region in northern France. On 1 January 2016, it was merged into the new commune of Flancourt-Crescy-en-Roumois.

== See also ==
- Communes of the Eure department
