= Theillement =

- Part of Thénouville
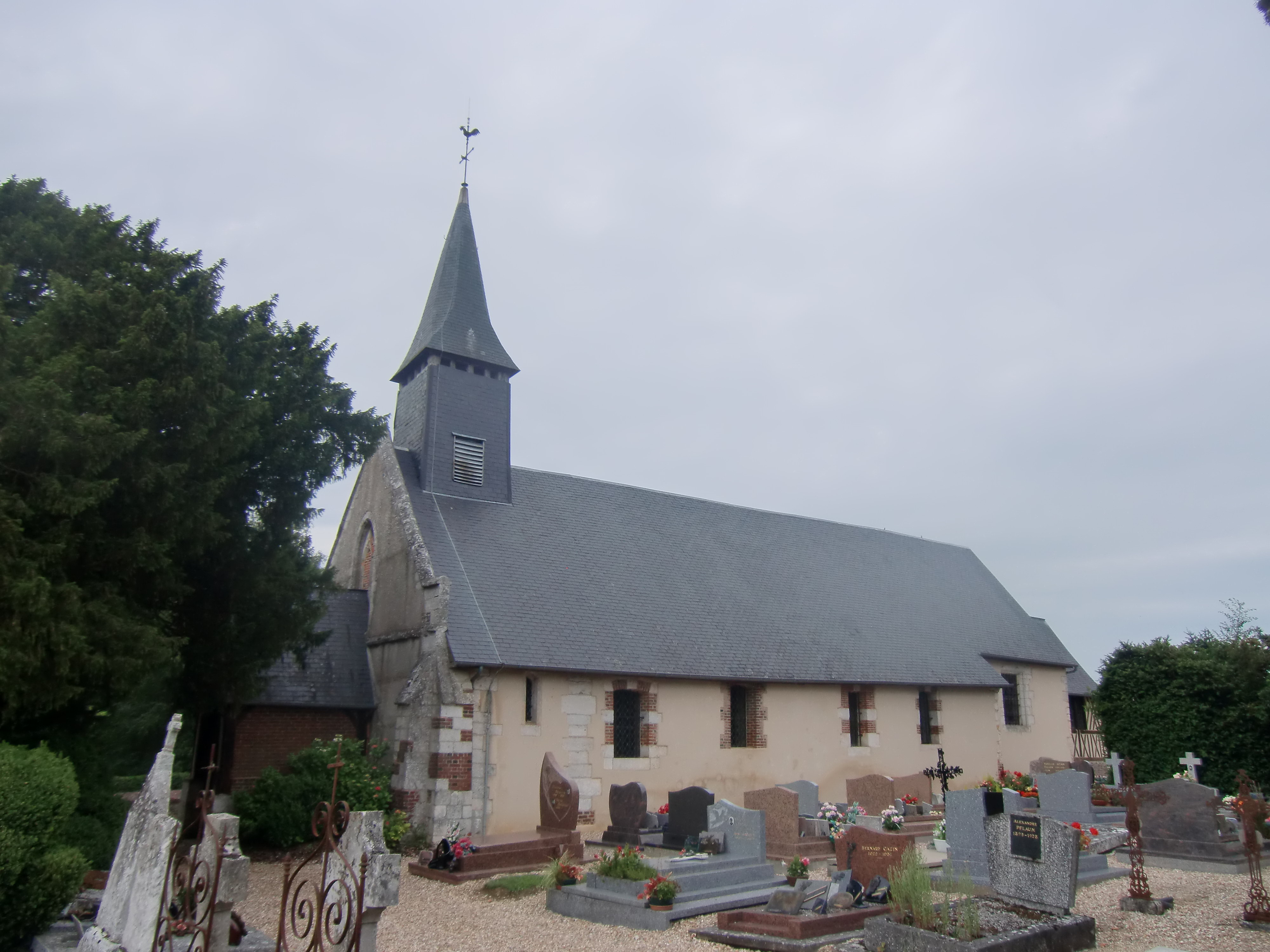
- Location of Theillement
- Location within France Location within Normandy
- Coordinates: 49°17′20″N 0°48′01″E
- Country: France
- Region: Normandy
- Department: Eure
- Arrondissement: Bernay
- Canton: Bourgtheroulde-Infreville
- Commune: Thénouville
- Area^{1}: 7.14 km^{2} (2.76 sq mi)
- Elevation: 130 m (430 ft)
- Highest elevation: 149 m (489 ft)
- Lowest elevation: 85 m (279 ft)
- Population (2019): 425
  - Density: 59.5/km^{2} (154/sq mi)
- Time zone: UTC+01:00 (CET)
  - Summer (DST): UTC+02:00 (CEST)
- Postal code: 27520
- ^{1} French Land Register data, which excludes lakes, ponds, glaciers > 1 km^{2} (0.386 sq mi or 247 acres) and river estuaries.

Theillement (French pronunciation: [tɛjmɑ̃]) is a former commune in the Eure department in Normandy in northern France. On 1 January 2017, it was merged into the new commune Thénouville.

== See also ==
- Communes of the Eure department
