= Saint-Philbert-sur-Boissey =

- Commune
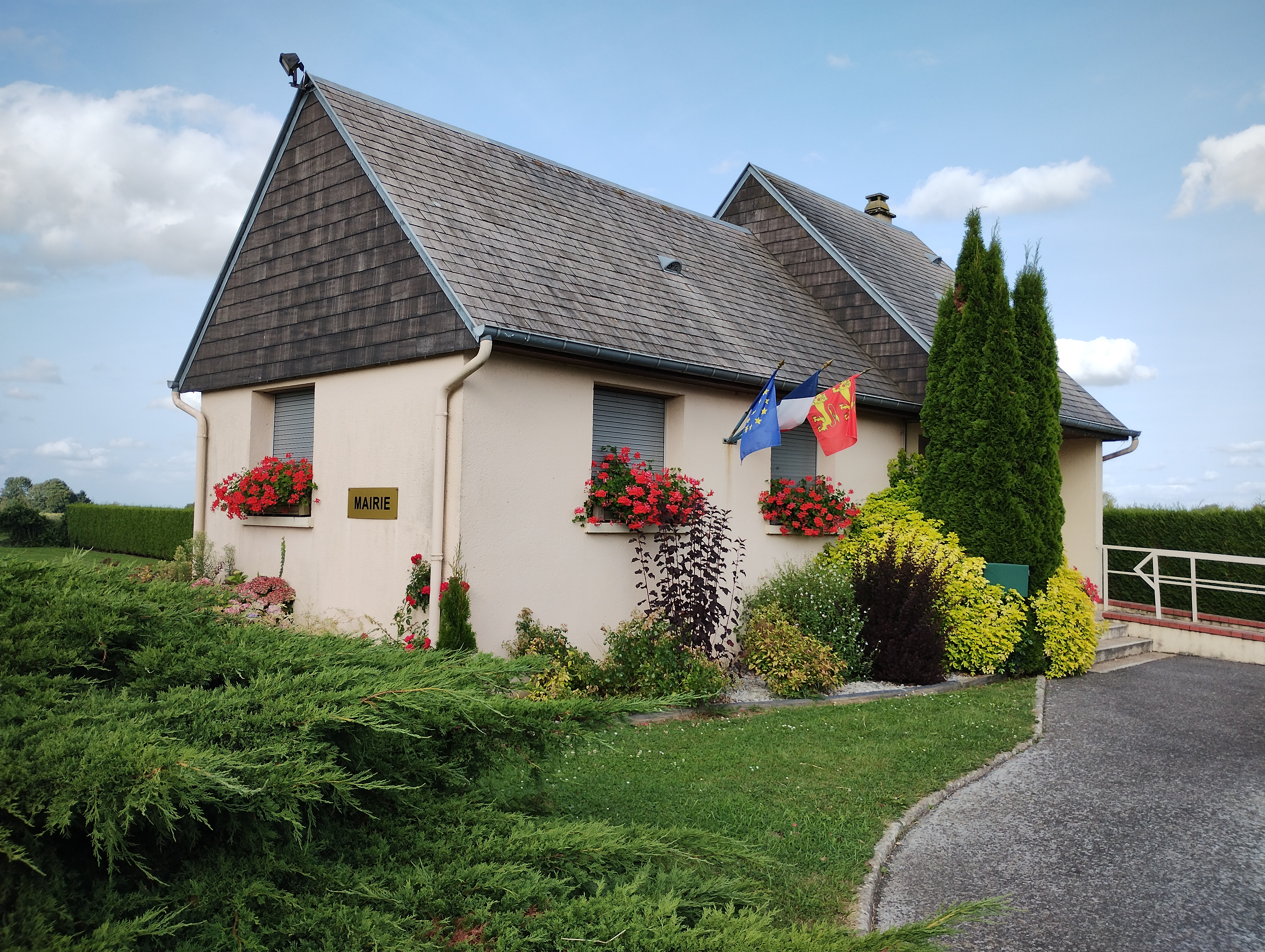
- Saint-Philbert-sur-Boissey Town hall
- Location of Saint-Philbert-sur-Boissey
- Location within France Location within Normandy
- Coordinates: 49°15′20″N 0°47′06″E
- Country: France
- Region: Normandy
- Department: Eure
- Arrondissement: Bernay
- Canton: Grand Bourgtheroulde

Government
  - Mayor (2020–2026): Franck Bucher
- Area^{1}: 3.03 km^{2} (1.17 sq mi)
- Elevation: 145 m (476 ft)
- Highest elevation: 159 m (522 ft)
- Lowest elevation: 128 m (420 ft)
- Population (2023): 170
  - Density: 56/km^{2} (150/sq mi)
- Time zone: UTC+01:00 (CET)
  - Summer (DST): UTC+02:00 (CEST)
- INSEE/Postal code: 27586 /27520
- ^{1} French Land Register data, which excludes lakes, ponds, glaciers > 1 km^{2} (0.386 sq mi or 247 acres) and river estuaries.

Saint-Philbert-sur-Boissey (French pronunciation: [sɛ̃ filbɛʁ syʁ bwasɛ], literally Saint-Philbert on Boissey) is a commune in the Eure department in Normandy in northern France.

== Population ==
Historical population
Year	Pop.	±% p.a.
1968	78	—
1975	84	+1.06%
1982	109	+3.79%
1990	154	+4.41%
1999	130	−1.86%
2007	155	+2.22%
2012	171	+1.98%
2017	172	+0.12%
2023	170	−0.19%
Source: INSEE

== See also ==
- Communes of the Eure department
