= Bosnormand =

- Part of Bosroumois
- Location of Bosnormand
- Location within France Location within Normandy
- Coordinates: 49°16′49″N 0°54′33″E
- Country: France
- Region: Normandy
- Department: Eure
- Arrondissement: Bernay
- Canton: Bourgtheroulde-Infreville
- Commune: Bosroumois
- Area^{1}: 3.34 km^{2} (1.29 sq mi)
- Elevation: 150 m (490 ft)
- Highest elevation: 161 m (528 ft)
- Lowest elevation: 124 m (407 ft)
- Population (2019): 326
  - Density: 97.6/km^{2} (253/sq mi)
- Time zone: UTC+01:00 (CET)
  - Summer (DST): UTC+02:00 (CEST)
- Postal code: 27670
- ^{1} French Land Register data, which excludes lakes, ponds, glaciers > 1 km^{2} (0.386 sq mi or 247 acres) and river estuaries.

Bosnormand (French pronunciation: [bonɔʁmɑ̃]) is a former commune in the Eure department in Normandy in northern France. On 1 January 2017, it was merged into the new commune Bosroumois.

== See also ==
- Communes of the Eure department
