= Saint-Amand-des-Hautes-Terres =

- Part of Amfreville-Saint-Amand
- Location of Saint-Amand-des-Hautes-Terres
- Location within France Location within Normandy
- Coordinates: 49°14′05″N 0°56′03″E
- Country: France
- Region: Normandy
- Department: Eure
- Arrondissement: Bernay
- Canton: Bourgtheroulde-Infreville
- Commune: Amfreville-Saint-Amand
- Area^{1}: 2.98 km^{2} (1.15 sq mi)
- Elevation: 160 m (520 ft)
- Highest elevation: 166 m (545 ft)
- Lowest elevation: 110 m (360 ft)
- Population (2023): 330
  - Density: 110/km^{2} (290/sq mi)
- Time zone: UTC+01:00 (CET)
  - Summer (DST): UTC+02:00 (CEST)
- Postal code: 27370
- ^{1} French Land Register data, which excludes lakes, ponds, glaciers > 1 km^{2} (0.386 sq mi or 247 acres) and river estuaries.

Saint-Amand-des-Hautes-Terres (French pronunciation: [sɛ̃.t‿amɑ̃ de ot tɛʁ]) is a former commune in the Eure department in Normandy in northern France. On 1 January 2016, it was merged into the new commune of Amfreville-Saint-Amand.

== See also ==
- Communes of the Eure department
