= Amfreville-la-Campagne =

- Part of Amfreville-Saint-Amand
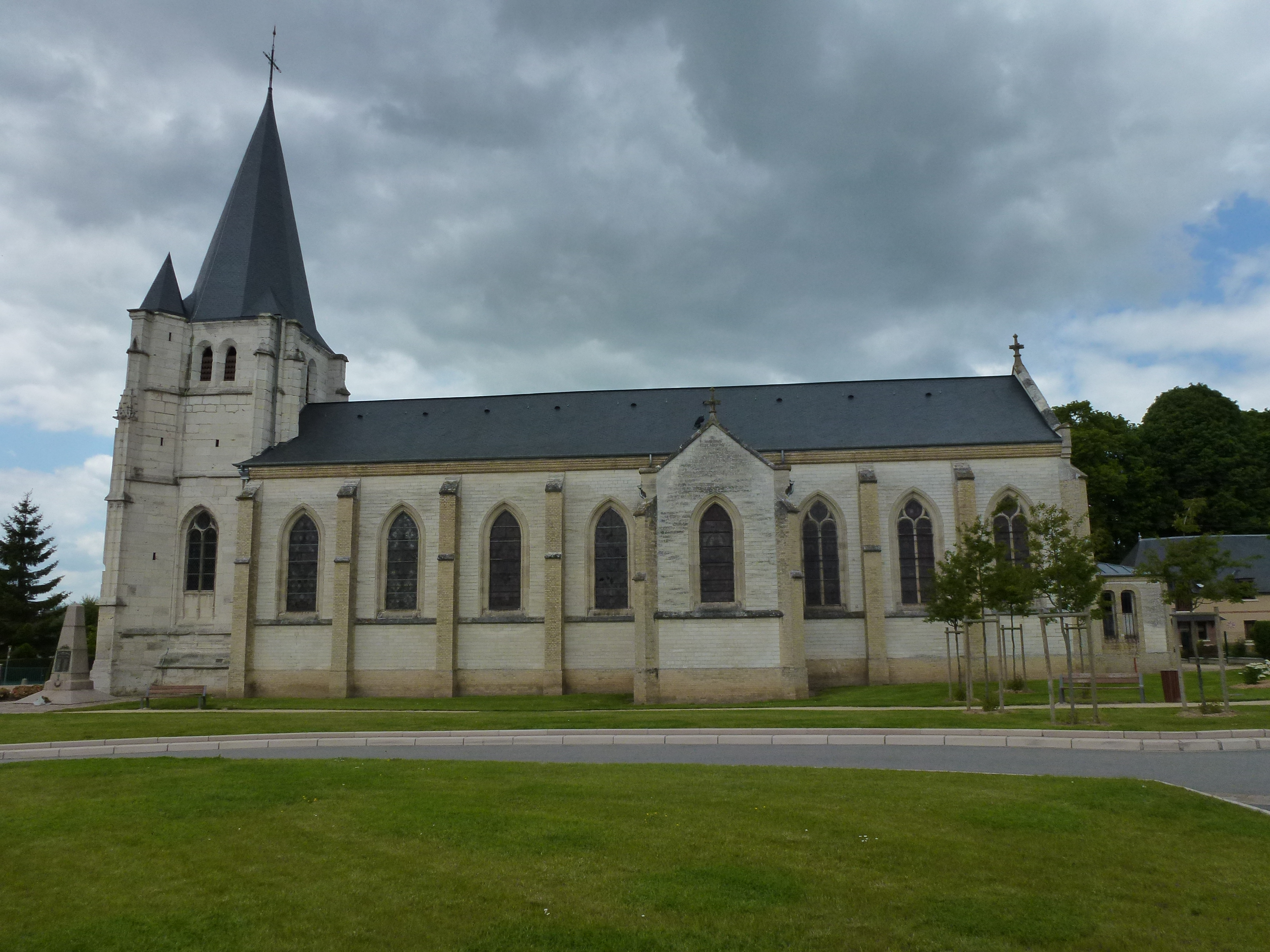

- Coat of arms
- Location of Amfreville-la-Campagne
- Location within France Location within Normandy
- Coordinates: 49°12′50″N 0°55′48″E
- Country: France
- Region: Normandy
- Department: Eure
- Arrondissement: Bernay
- Canton: Bourgtheroulde-Infreville
- Commune: Amfreville-Saint-Amand
- Area^{1}: 6.64 km^{2} (2.56 sq mi)
- Elevation: 159 m (522 ft)
- Highest elevation: 166 m (545 ft)
- Lowest elevation: 149 m (489 ft)
- Population (2023): 877
  - Density: 132/km^{2} (342/sq mi)
- Time zone: UTC+01:00 (CET)
  - Summer (DST): UTC+02:00 (CEST)
- Postal code: 27370
- ^{1} French Land Register data, which excludes lakes, ponds, glaciers > 1 km^{2} (0.386 sq mi or 247 acres) and river estuaries.

Amfreville-la-Campagne (French pronunciation: [ɑ̃fʁəvil la kɑ̃paɲ]) is a former commune in the Eure department in Normandy in northern France. On 1 January 2016, it was merged into the new commune of Amfreville-Saint-Amand.

== See also ==
- Communes of the Eure department
