= Bosc-Bénard-Crescy =

- Part of Flancourt-Crescy-en-Roumois
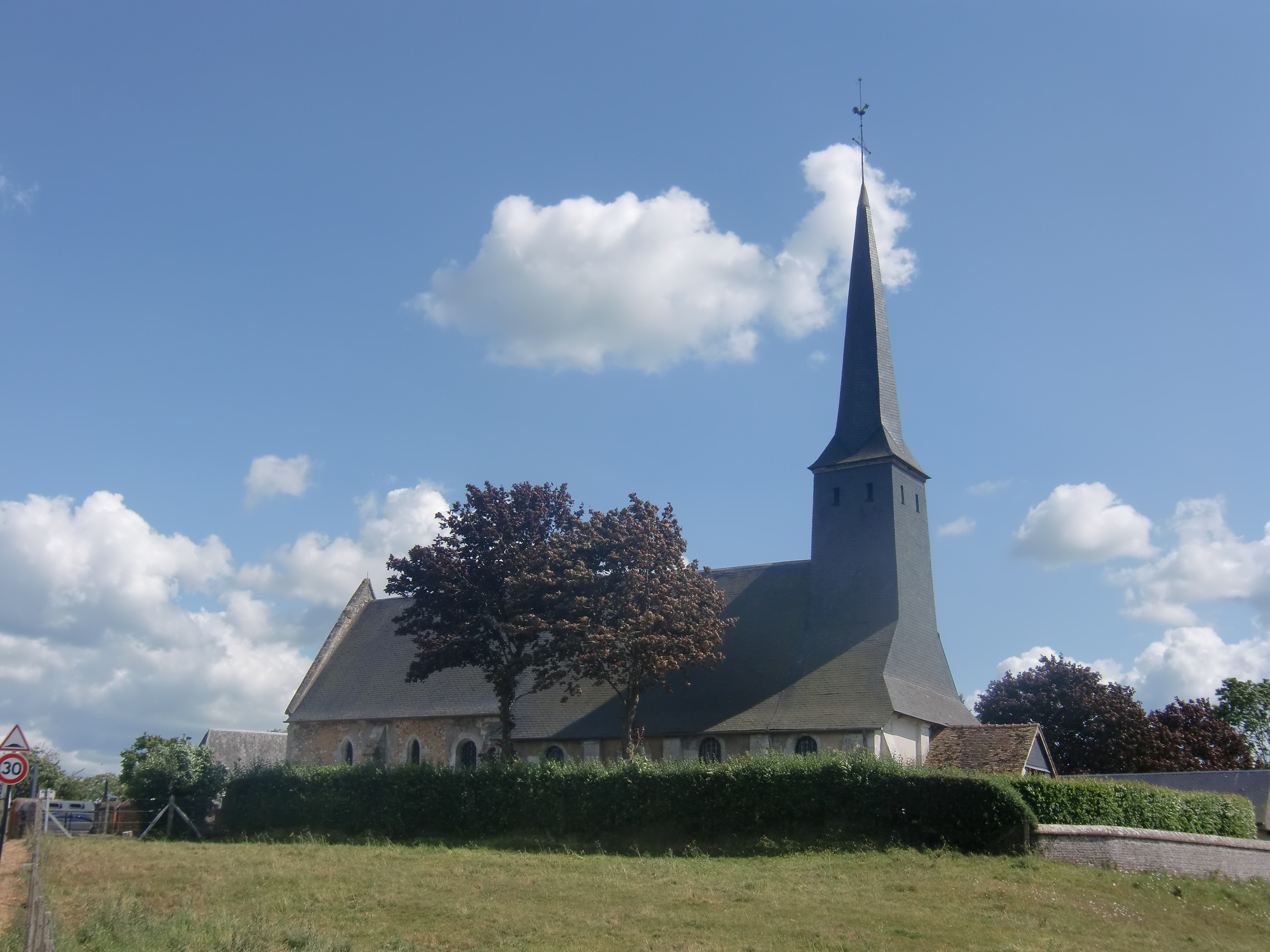
- Location of Bosc-Bénard-Crescy
- Location within France Location within Normandy
- Coordinates: 49°19′21″N 0°48′32″E
- Country: France
- Region: Normandy
- Department: Eure
- Arrondissement: Bernay
- Canton: Bourgtheroulde-Infreville
- Commune: Flancourt-Crescy-en-Roumois
- Area^{1}: 4.39 km^{2} (1.69 sq mi)
- Elevation: 140 m (460 ft)
- Highest elevation: 147 m (482 ft)
- Lowest elevation: 119 m (390 ft)
- Population (2022): 469
  - Density: 107/km^{2} (277/sq mi)
- Time zone: UTC+01:00 (CET)
  - Summer (DST): UTC+02:00 (CEST)
- Postal code: 27310
- ^{1} French Land Register data, which excludes lakes, ponds, glaciers > 1 km^{2} (0.386 sq mi or 247 acres) and river estuaries.

Bosc-Bénard-Crescy (French pronunciation: [bo benaʁ kʁesi]) is a former commune in the Eure department in Normandy in northern France. On 1 January 2016, it was merged into the new commune of Flancourt-Crescy-en-Roumois.

== See also ==
- Communes of the Eure department
