= Flancourt-Catelon =

- Part of Flancourt-Crescy-en-Roumois
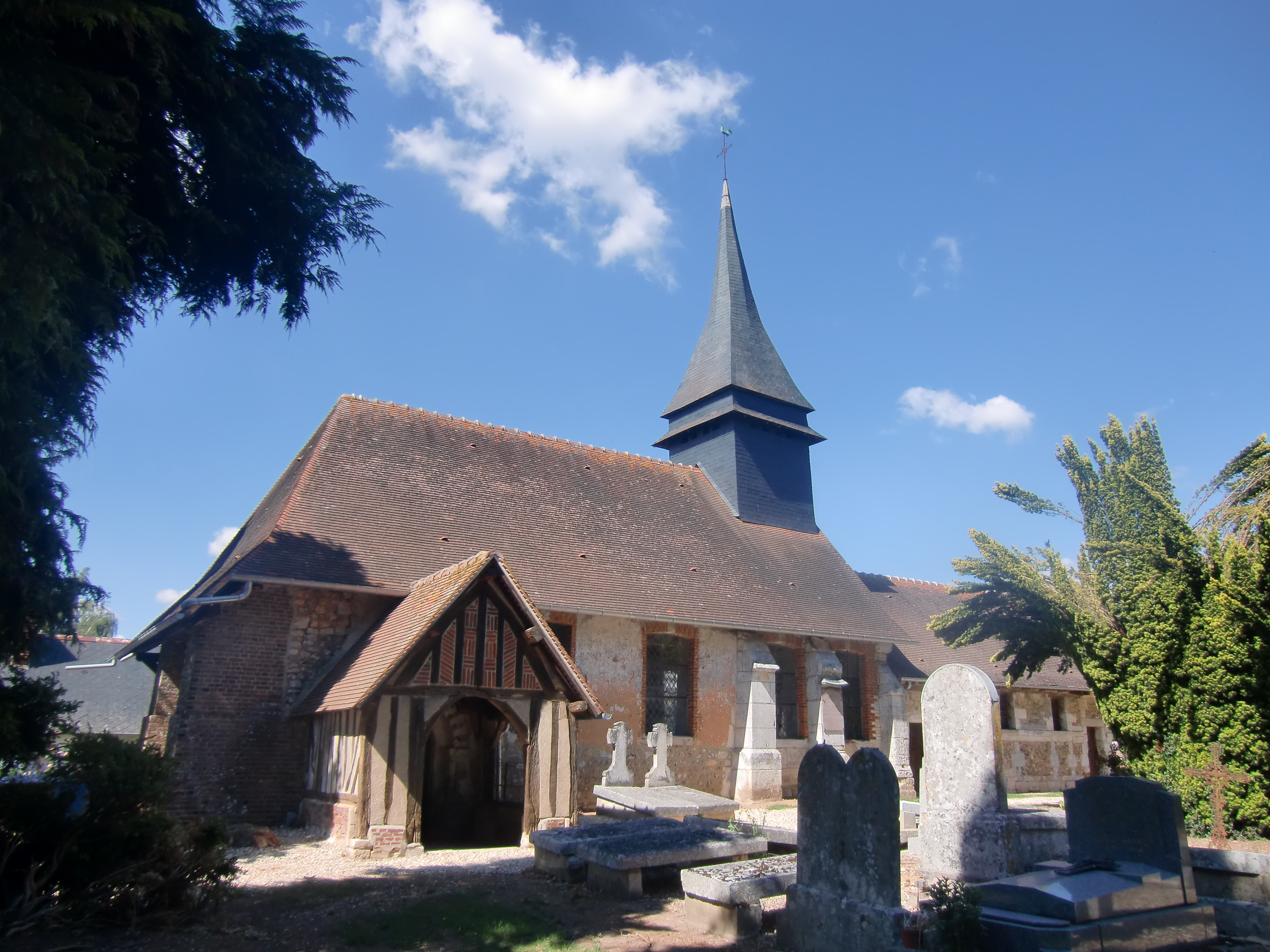
- Location of Flancourt-Catelon
- Location within France Location within Normandy
- Coordinates: 49°20′03″N 0°46′27″E
- Country: France
- Region: Normandy
- Department: Eure
- Arrondissement: Bernay
- Canton: Bourgtheroulde-Infreville
- Commune: Flancourt-Crescy-en-Roumois
- Area^{1}: 7.97 km^{2} (3.08 sq mi)
- Elevation: 138 m (453 ft)
- Highest elevation: 139 m (456 ft)
- Lowest elevation: 90 m (300 ft)
- Population (2019): 507
  - Density: 63.6/km^{2} (165/sq mi)
- Time zone: UTC+01:00 (CET)
  - Summer (DST): UTC+02:00 (CEST)
- Postal code: 27310
- ^{1} French Land Register data, which excludes lakes, ponds, glaciers > 1 km^{2} (0.386 sq mi or 247 acres) and river estuaries.

Flancourt-Catelon (French pronunciation: [flɑ̃kuʁ katlɔ̃]) is a former commune in the Eure department in the Normandy region in northern France. On 1 January 2016, it was merged into the new commune of Flancourt-Crescy-en-Roumois.

== See also ==
- Communes of the Eure department
