= Le Bosc-Roger-en-Roumois =

- Part of Bosroumois
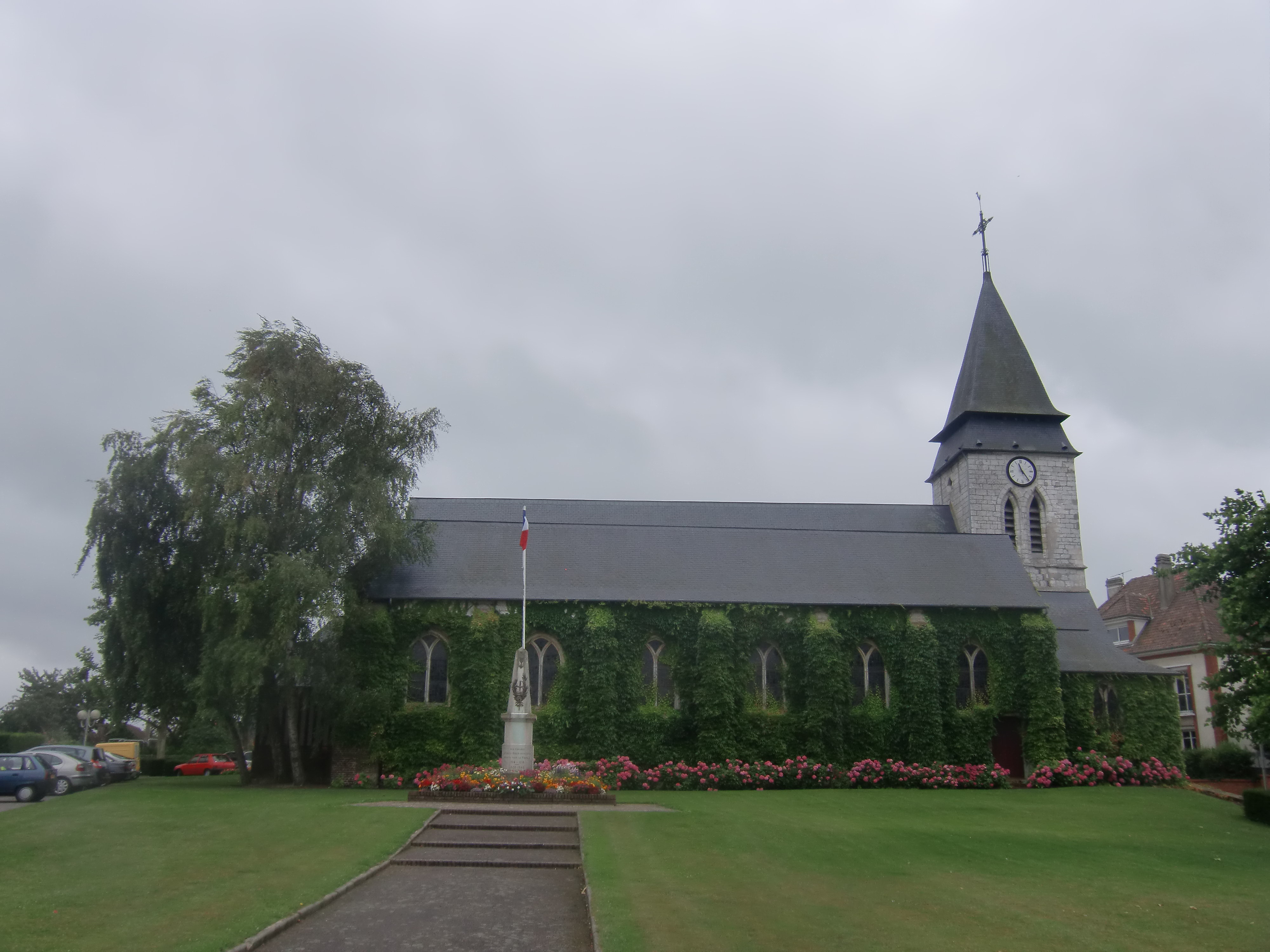

- Coat of arms
- Location of Le Bosc-Roger-en-Roumois
- Location within France Location within Normandy
- Coordinates: 49°17′26″N 0°55′30″E
- Country: France
- Region: Normandy
- Department: Eure
- Arrondissement: Bernay
- Canton: Bourgtheroulde-Infreville
- Commune: Bosroumois
- Area^{1}: 9.9 km^{2} (3.8 sq mi)
- Elevation: 140 m (460 ft)
- Highest elevation: 162 m (531 ft)
- Lowest elevation: 107 m (351 ft)
- Population (2019): 3,323
  - Density: 340/km^{2} (870/sq mi)
- Time zone: UTC+01:00 (CET)
  - Summer (DST): UTC+02:00 (CEST)
- Postal code: 27670
- ^{1} French Land Register data, which excludes lakes, ponds, glaciers > 1 km^{2} (0.386 sq mi or 247 acres) and river estuaries.

Le Bosc-Roger-en-Roumois (French pronunciation: [lə bo ʁɔʒe ɑ̃ ʁumwa]) is a former commune in the Eure department in Normandy in northern France. On 1 January 2017, it was merged into the new commune Bosroumois.

== Population ==
Historical population
Year	Pop.	±% p.a.
1962	962	—
1968	1,162	+3.20%
1975	1,647	+5.11%
1982	2,323	+5.04%
1990	2,895	+2.79%
1999	3,003	+0.41%
2006	3,218	+0.99%
2019	3,323	+0.25%
Source: EHESS and INSEE

== See also ==
- Communes of the Eure department
