= Touville =

- Part of Thénouville
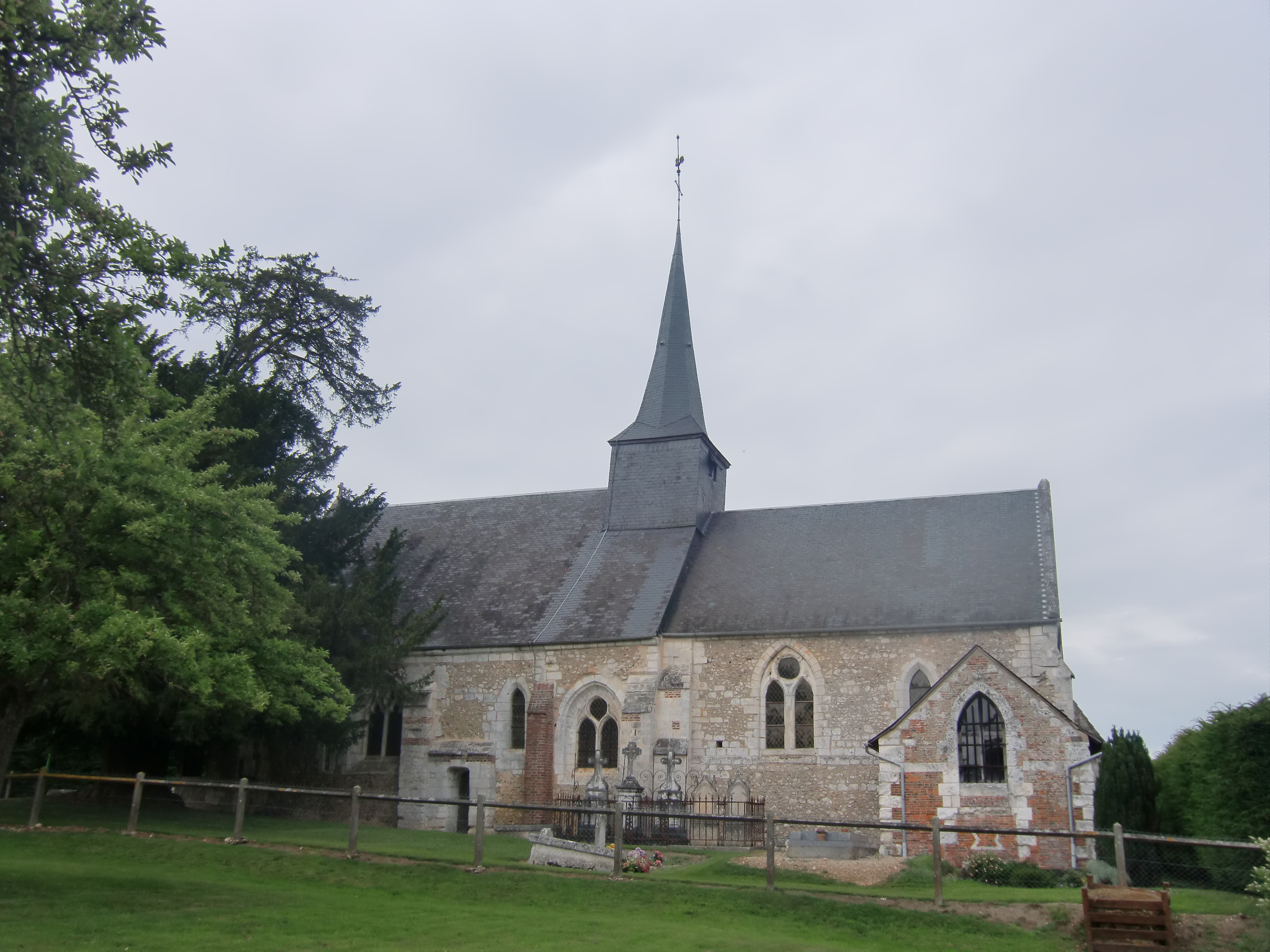
- Location of Touville
- Location within France Location within Normandy
- Coordinates: 49°18′15″N 0°45′36″E
- Country: France
- Region: Normandy
- Department: Eure
- Arrondissement: Bernay
- Canton: Pont-Audemer
- Commune: Thénouville
- Area^{1}: 3.49 km^{2} (1.35 sq mi)
- Elevation: 130 m (430 ft)
- Highest elevation: 147 m (482 ft)
- Lowest elevation: 80 m (260 ft)
- Population (2019): 182
  - Density: 52.1/km^{2} (135/sq mi)
- Time zone: UTC+01:00 (CET)
  - Summer (DST): UTC+02:00 (CEST)
- Postal code: 27290
- ^{1} French Land Register data, which excludes lakes, ponds, glaciers > 1 km^{2} (0.386 sq mi or 247 acres) and river estuaries.

Touville (French pronunciation: [tuvil]; also known as Touville-sur-Montfort) is a former commune in the Eure department in Normandy in northern France. On 1 January 2018, it was merged into the commune of Thénouville.

== See also ==
- Communes of the Eure department
