= La Harengère =

- Commune
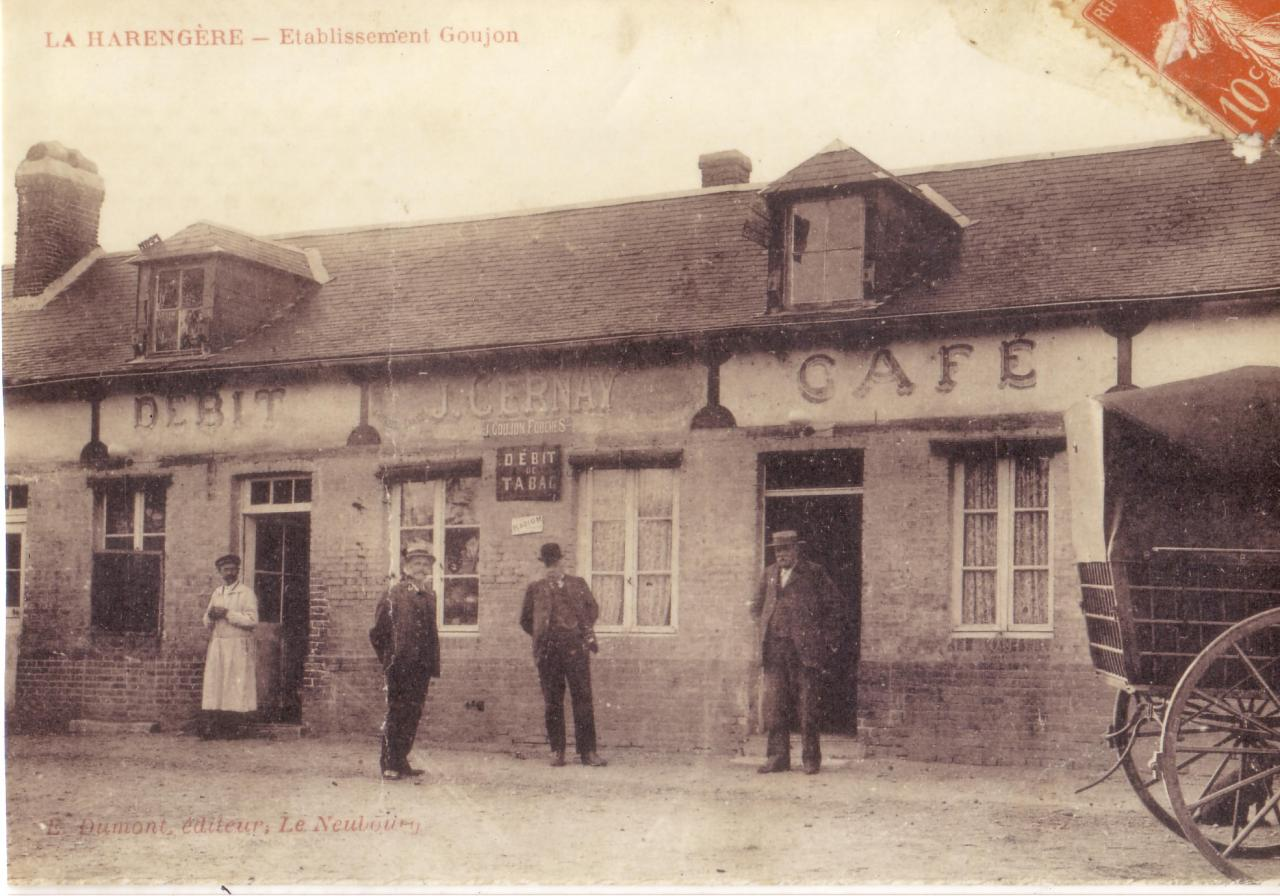
- The old cafe in La Harengère
- Location of La Harengère
- Location within France Location within Normandy
- Coordinates: 49°13′58″N 0°59′53″E
- Country: France
- Region: Normandy
- Department: Eure
- Arrondissement: Bernay
- Canton: Grand Bourgtheroulde
- Intercommunality: CA Seine-Eure

Government
  - Mayor (2020–2026): Fernand Lenoir
- Area^{1}: 3.59 km^{2} (1.39 sq mi)
- Elevation: 156 m (512 ft)
- Highest elevation: 162 m (531 ft)
- Lowest elevation: 85 m (279 ft)
- Population (2023): 588
  - Density: 164/km^{2} (424/sq mi)
- Time zone: UTC+01:00 (CET)
  - Summer (DST): UTC+02:00 (CEST)
- INSEE/Postal code: 27313 /27370
- ^{1} French Land Register data, which excludes lakes, ponds, glaciers > 1 km^{2} (0.386 sq mi or 247 acres) and river estuaries.

La Harengère (French pronunciation: [la aʁɑ̃ʒɛʁ]) is a commune in the Eure department in northern France.

== Population ==
Historical population
Year	Pop.	±% p.a.
1968	208	—
1975	242	+2.19%
1982	354	+5.58%
1990	421	+2.19%
1999	418	−0.08%
2007	512	+2.57%
2012	549	+1.41%
2017	595	+1.62%
2023	588	−0.20%
Source: INSEE

== See also ==
- Communes of the Eure department
