= Tourville-la-Campagne =

- Commune
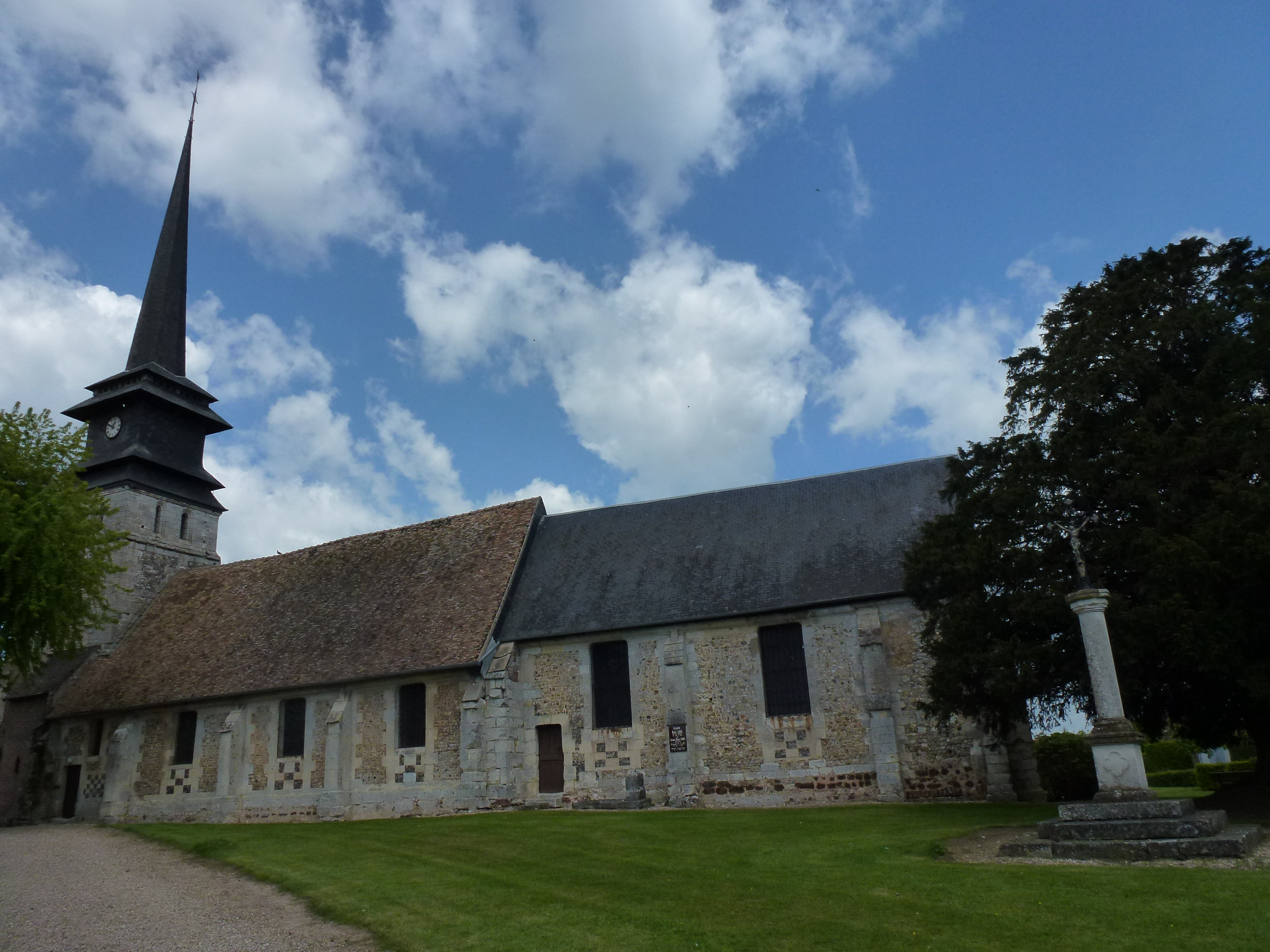
- The church in Tourville-la-Campagne

- Coat of arms
- Location of Tourville-la-Campagne
- Location within France Location within Normandy
- Coordinates: 49°13′39″N 0°54′20″E
- Country: France
- Region: Normandy
- Department: Eure
- Arrondissement: Bernay
- Canton: Grand Bourgtheroulde

Government
  - Mayor (2020–2026): Hugues Bourgault
- Area^{1}: 8.27 km^{2} (3.19 sq mi)
- Elevation: 156 m (512 ft)
- Highest elevation: 177 m (581 ft)
- Lowest elevation: 146 m (479 ft)
- Population (2023): 1,107
  - Density: 134/km^{2} (347/sq mi)
- Time zone: UTC+01:00 (CET)
  - Summer (DST): UTC+02:00 (CEST)
- INSEE/Postal code: 27654 /27370
- ^{1} French Land Register data, which excludes lakes, ponds, glaciers > 1 km^{2} (0.386 sq mi or 247 acres) and river estuaries.

Tourville-la-Campagne is a commune in the Eure department in Normandy in northern France.

== Population ==
Historical population
Year	Pop.	±% p.a.
1968	313	—
1975	471	+6.01%
1982	602	+3.57%
1990	730	+2.44%
1999	753	+0.35%
2007	864	+1.73%
2012	987	+2.70%
2017	1,081	+1.84%
2023	1,107	+0.40%
Source: INSEE

== See also ==
- Communes of the Eure department
