= Saint-Ouen-du-Tilleul =

- Commune
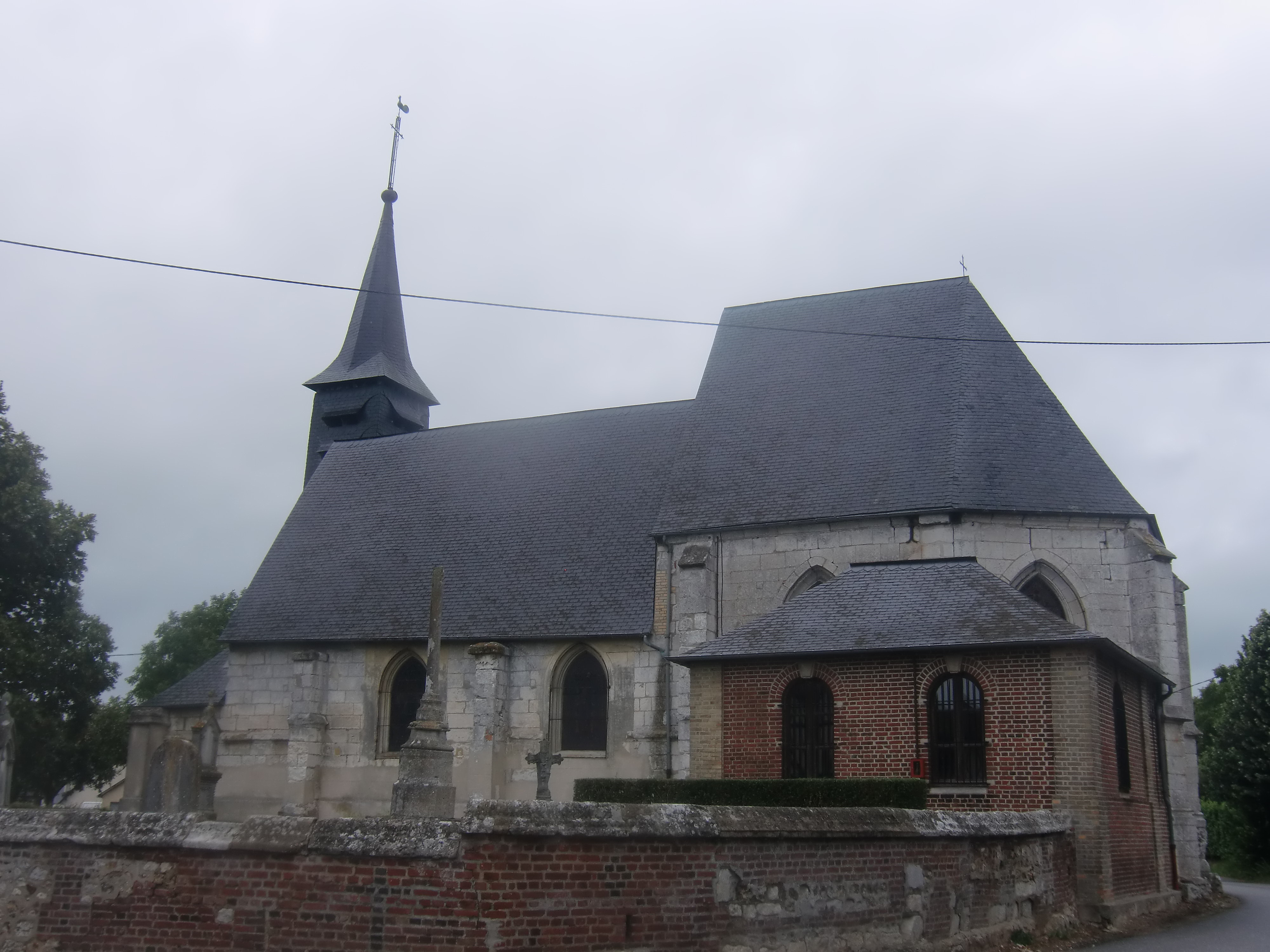
- The church in Saint-Ouen-du-Tilleul

- Coat of arms
- Location of Saint-Ouen-du-Tilleul
- Location within France Location within Normandy
- Coordinates: 49°17′41″N 0°56′56″E
- Country: France
- Region: Normandy
- Department: Eure
- Arrondissement: Bernay
- Canton: Grand Bourgtheroulde

Government
  - Mayor (2020–2026): Jean Aubourg
- Area^{1}: 3.99 km^{2} (1.54 sq mi)
- Elevation: 143 m (469 ft)
- Highest elevation: 138 m (453 ft)
- Lowest elevation: 60 m (200 ft)
- Population (2023): 1,792
  - Density: 449/km^{2} (1,160/sq mi)
- Time zone: UTC+01:00 (CET)
  - Summer (DST): UTC+02:00 (CEST)
- INSEE/Postal code: 27582 /27670
- ^{1} French Land Register data, which excludes lakes, ponds, glaciers > 1 km^{2} (0.386 sq mi or 247 acres) and river estuaries.

Saint-Ouen-du-Tilleul (French pronunciation: [sɛ̃.t‿wɛ̃ dy tijœl]) is a commune in the Eure department in Normandy in northern France.

== Population ==
Historical population
Year	Pop.	±% p.a.
1968	616	—
1975	984	+6.92%
1982	1,203	+2.91%
1990	1,521	+2.98%
1999	1,413	−0.82%
2007	1,561	+1.25%
2012	1,558	−0.04%
2017	1,653	+1.19%
2023	1,792	+1.35%
Source: INSEE

== See also ==
- Communes of the Eure department
