= Saint-Didier-des-Bois =

- Commune
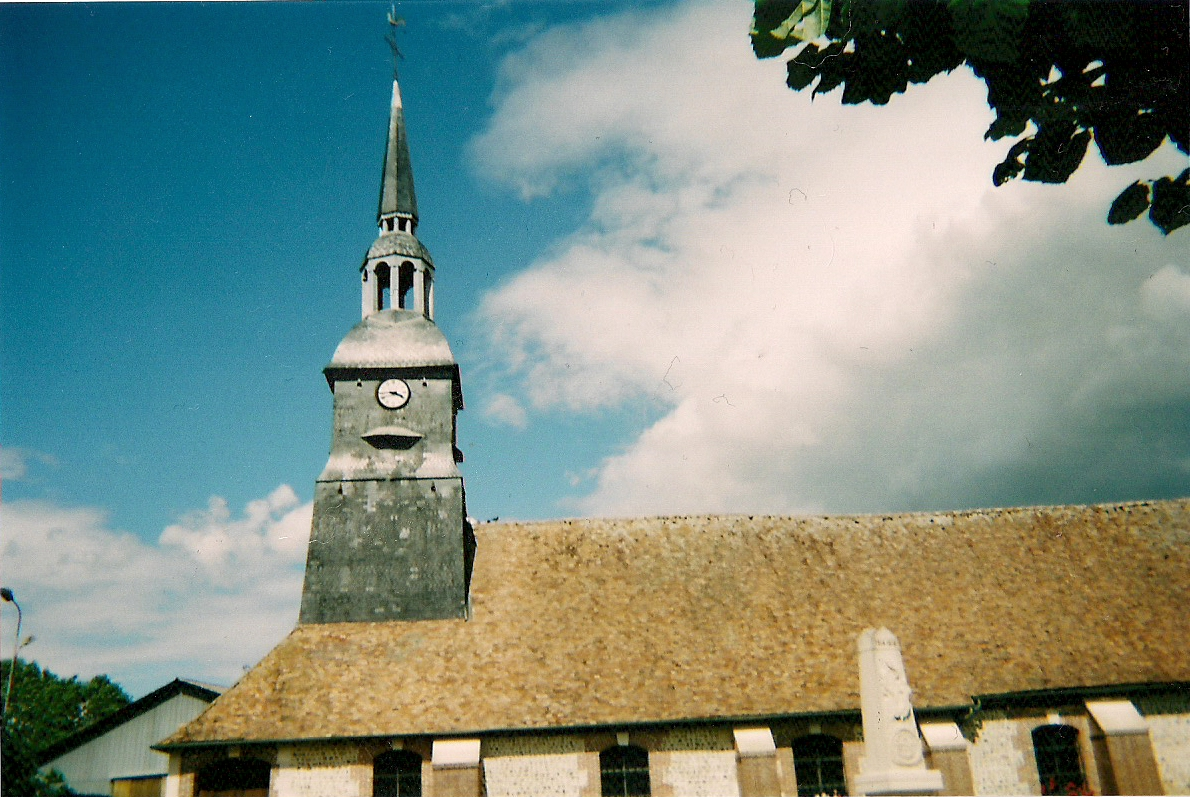
- The church in Saint-Didier-des-Bois
- Location of Saint-Didier-des-Bois
- Location within France Location within Normandy
- Coordinates: 49°14′14″N 1°01′41″E
- Country: France
- Region: Normandy
- Department: Eure
- Arrondissement: Bernay
- Canton: Grand Bourgtheroulde
- Intercommunality: CA Seine-Eure

Government
  - Mayor (2020–2026): Jacky Goy
- Area^{1}: 5.58 km^{2} (2.15 sq mi)
- Elevation: 155 m (509 ft)
- Highest elevation: 152 m (499 ft)
- Lowest elevation: 43 m (141 ft)
- Population (2023): 892
  - Density: 160/km^{2} (414/sq mi)
- Time zone: UTC+01:00 (CET)
  - Summer (DST): UTC+02:00 (CEST)
- INSEE/Postal code: 27534 /27370
- ^{1} French Land Register data, which excludes lakes, ponds, glaciers > 1 km^{2} (0.386 sq mi or 247 acres) and river estuaries.

Saint-Didier-des-Bois is a commune in the Eure department in Normandy in northern France.

== Population ==
Historical population
Year	Pop.	±% p.a.
1968	410	—
1975	495	+2.73%
1982	760	+6.32%
1990	844	+1.32%
1999	787	−0.77%
2007	803	+0.25%
2012	845	+1.02%
2017	887	+0.97%
2023	892	+0.09%
Source: INSEE

== Personalities ==
In the early 1930s Antoine de Saint-Exupéry stayed at the house in the middle of the village where he had a friend Lucille Barette. Today this is a bed-and-breakfast.

== See also ==
- Communes of the Eure department
