= Flancourt-Crescy-en-Roumois =

- Commune
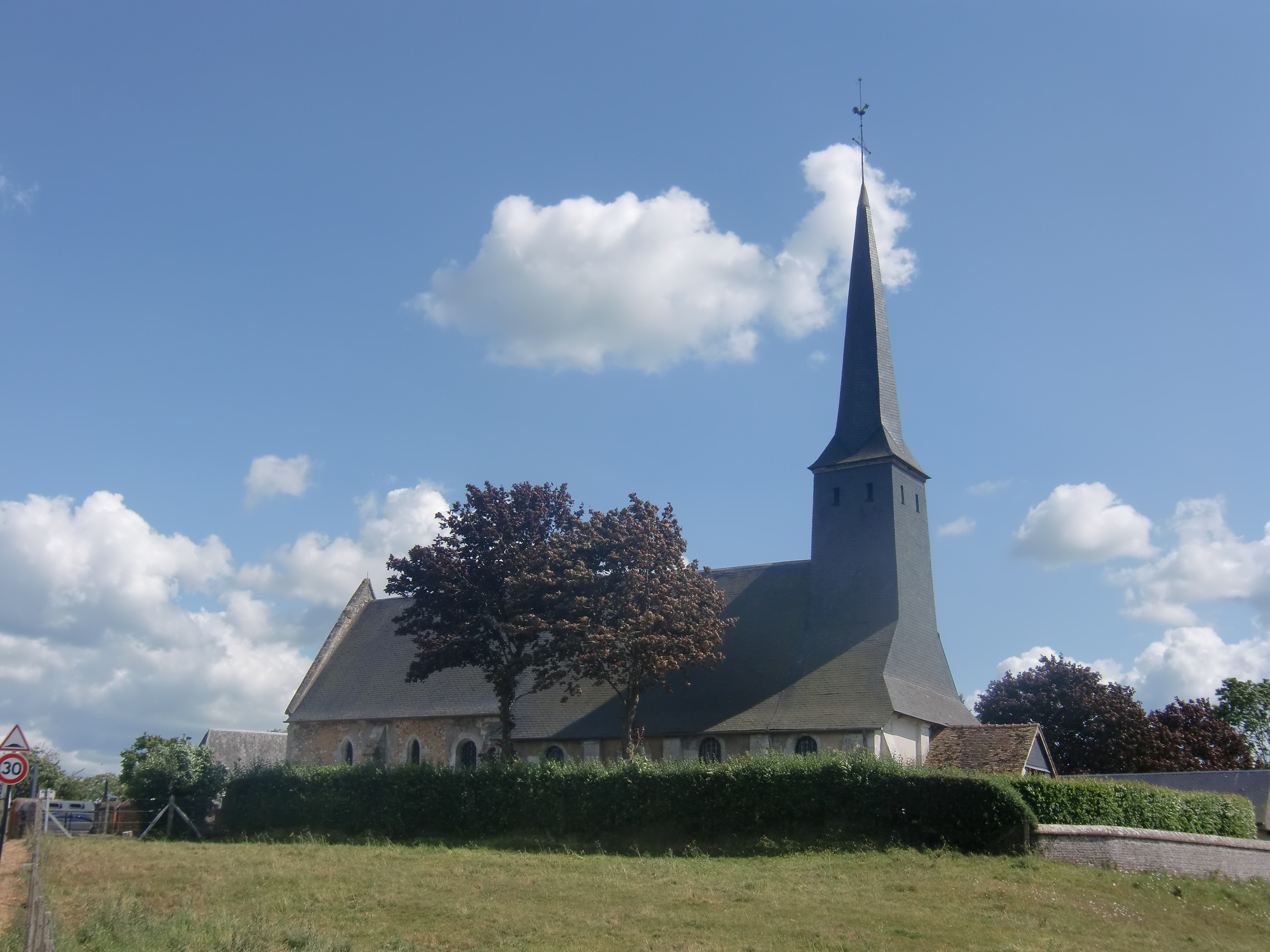
- The church in Bosc-Bénard-Crescy
- Location of Flancourt-Crescy-en-Roumois
- Location within France Location within Normandy
- Coordinates: 49°19′23″N 0°48′29″E
- Country: France
- Region: Normandy
- Department: Eure
- Arrondissement: Bernay
- Canton: Grand Bourgtheroulde

Government
  - Mayor (2020–2026): Bertrand Pecot
- Area^{1}: 19.01 km^{2} (7.34 sq mi)
- Population (2023): 1,612
  - Density: 84.80/km^{2} (219.6/sq mi)
- Time zone: UTC+01:00 (CET)
  - Summer (DST): UTC+02:00 (CEST)
- INSEE/Postal code: 27085 /27310
- ^{1} French Land Register data, which excludes lakes, ponds, glaciers > 1 km^{2} (0.386 sq mi or 247 acres) and river estuaries.

Flancourt-Crescy-en-Roumois (French pronunciation: [flɑ̃kuʁ kʁesi ɑ̃ ʁumwa], literally Flancourt-Crescy in Roumois) is a commune in the department of Eure, northern France. The municipality was established on 1 January 2016 by merger of the former communes of Bosc-Bénard-Crescy, Épreville-en-Roumois and Flancourt-Catelon.

== See also ==
- Communes of the Eure department
