= Saint-Pierre-des-Fleurs =

- Commune
- Coat of arms
- Location of Saint-Pierre-des-Fleurs
- Location within France Location within Normandy
- Coordinates: 49°15′05″N 0°58′00″E
- Country: France
- Region: Normandy
- Department: Eure
- Arrondissement: Bernay
- Canton: Grand Bourgtheroulde

Government
  - Mayor (2020–2026): Bruno Germain
- Area^{1}: 2.79 km^{2} (1.08 sq mi)
- Elevation: 153 m (502 ft)
- Highest elevation: 163 m (535 ft)
- Lowest elevation: 87 m (285 ft)
- Population (2023): 1,714
  - Density: 614/km^{2} (1,590/sq mi)
- Time zone: UTC+01:00 (CET)
  - Summer (DST): UTC+02:00 (CEST)
- INSEE/Postal code: 27593 /27370
- ^{1} French Land Register data, which excludes lakes, ponds, glaciers > 1 km^{2} (0.386 sq mi or 247 acres) and river estuaries.

Saint-Pierre-des-Fleurs (French pronunciation: [sɛ̃ pjɛʁ de flœʁ]) is a commune in the Eure department in Normandy in northern France.

== Population ==
Historical population
Year	Pop.	±% p.a.
1968	467	—
1975	668	+5.25%
1982	1,110	+7.52%
1990	1,132	+0.25%
1999	1,249	+1.10%
2007	1,276	+0.27%
2012	1,383	+1.62%
2017	1,562	+2.46%
2023	1,714	+1.56%
Source: INSEE

== See also ==
- Communes of the Eure department
