= La Haye-du-Theil =

- Commune
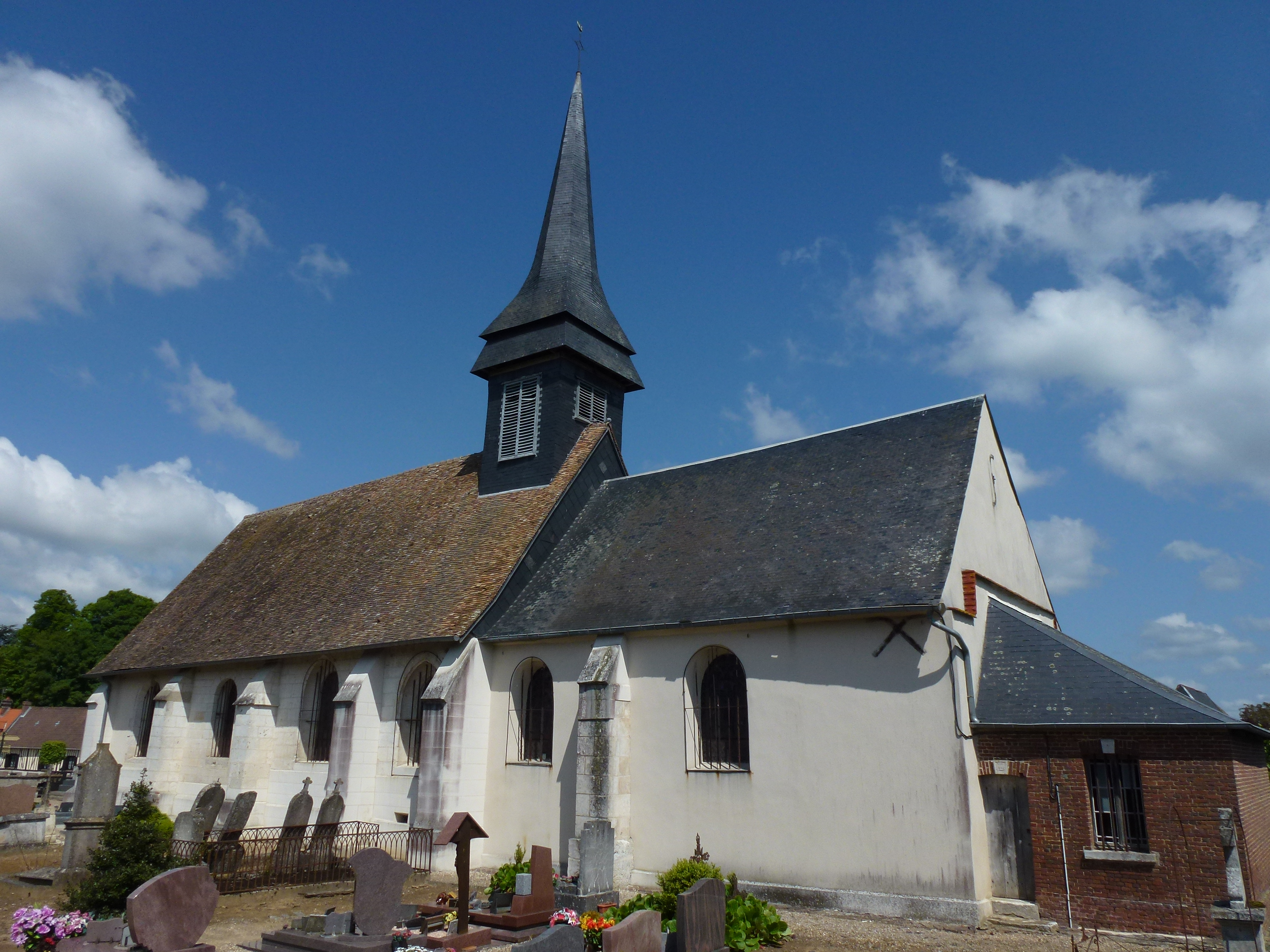
- The church of Saint-Ursin in La Haye-du-Theil
- Location of La Haye-du-Theil
- Location within France Location within Normandy
- Coordinates: 49°14′07″N 0°52′31″E
- Country: France
- Region: Normandy
- Department: Eure
- Arrondissement: Bernay
- Canton: Grand Bourgtheroulde

Government
  - Mayor (2020–2026): Alain Couchaux
- Area^{1}: 7.02 km^{2} (2.71 sq mi)
- Elevation: 150 m (490 ft)
- Highest elevation: 179 m (587 ft)
- Lowest elevation: 139 m (456 ft)
- Population (2023): 331
  - Density: 47.2/km^{2} (122/sq mi)
- Time zone: UTC+01:00 (CET)
  - Summer (DST): UTC+02:00 (CEST)
- INSEE/Postal code: 27320 /27370
- ^{1} French Land Register data, which excludes lakes, ponds, glaciers > 1 km^{2} (0.386 sq mi or 247 acres) and river estuaries.

La Haye-du-Theil (French pronunciation: [la ɛ dy tɛj]) is a commune in the Eure department in northern France.

== Population ==
Historical population
Year	Pop.	±% p.a.
1968	201	—
1975	194	−0.51%
1982	187	−0.52%
1990	194	+0.46%
1999	250	+2.86%
2007	259	+0.44%
2012	289	+2.22%
2017	298	+0.62%
2023	331	+1.77%
Source: INSEE

== See also ==
- Communes of the Eure department
