= Saint-Cyr-la-Campagne =

- Commune
- Location of Saint-Cyr-la-Campagne
- Location within France Location within Normandy
- Coordinates: 49°15′14″N 1°01′11″E
- Country: France
- Region: Normandy
- Department: Eure
- Arrondissement: Bernay
- Canton: Grand Bourgtheroulde
- Intercommunality: CA Seine-Eure

Government
  - Mayor (2020–2026): Max Guilbert
- Area^{1}: 2.91 km^{2} (1.12 sq mi)
- Elevation: 100 m (330 ft)
- Highest elevation: 132 m (433 ft)
- Lowest elevation: 34 m (112 ft)
- Population (2023): 431
  - Density: 148/km^{2} (384/sq mi)
- Time zone: UTC+01:00 (CET)
  - Summer (DST): UTC+02:00 (CEST)
- INSEE/Postal code: 27529 /27370
- ^{1} French Land Register data, which excludes lakes, ponds, glaciers > 1 km^{2} (0.386 sq mi or 247 acres) and river estuaries.

Saint-Cyr-la-Campagne (French pronunciation: [sɛ̃ siʁ la kɑ̃paɲ]) is a commune in the Eure department in Normandy in northern France.

== Population ==
Historical population
Year	Pop.	±% p.a.
1968	273	—
1975	317	+2.16%
1982	364	+1.99%
1990	404	+1.31%
1999	370	−0.97%
2007	408	+1.23%
2012	412	+0.20%
2017	427	+0.72%
2023	431	+0.16%
Source: INSEE

== See also ==
- Communes of the Eure department
