= Bosroumois =

- Commune
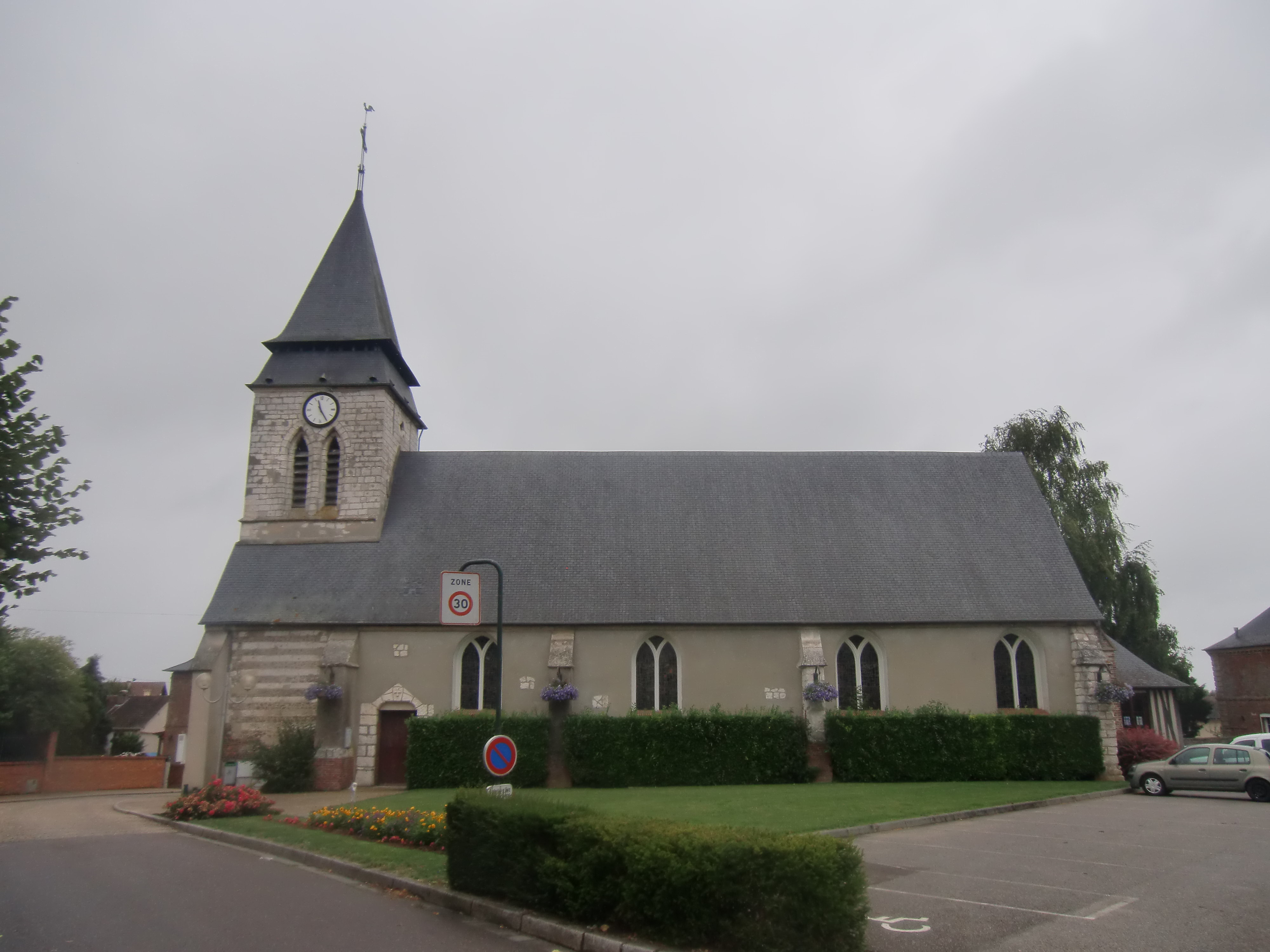
- The church in Le Bosc-Roger-en-Roumois
- Location of Bosroumois
- Location within France Location within Normandy
- Coordinates: 49°17′28″N 0°55′30″E
- Country: France
- Region: Normandy
- Department: Eure
- Arrondissement: Bernay
- Canton: Grand Bourgtheroulde
- Intercommunality: Roumois Seine

Government
  - Mayor (2020–2026): Philippe Vanheule
- Area^{1}: 13.24 km^{2} (5.11 sq mi)
- Population (2023): 3,872
  - Density: 292.4/km^{2} (757.4/sq mi)
- Time zone: UTC+01:00 (CET)
  - Summer (DST): UTC+02:00 (CEST)
- INSEE/Postal code: 27090 /27670
- ^{1} French Land Register data, which excludes lakes, ponds, glaciers > 1 km^{2} (0.386 sq mi or 247 acres) and river estuaries.

Bosroumois (French pronunciation: [boʁumwa]) is a commune in the department of Eure, northern France. The municipality was established on 1 January 2017 by merger of the former communes of Le Bosc-Roger-en-Roumois (the seat) and Bosnormand.

== Population ==
Population data refer to the commune in its geography as of January 2025.

Historical population
Year	Pop.	±% p.a.
1968	1,348	—
1975	1,853	+4.65%
1982	2,556	+4.70%
1990	3,178	+2.76%
1999	3,279	+0.35%
2007	3,546	+0.98%
2012	3,472	−0.42%
2017	3,588	+0.66%
2023	3,872	+1.28%
Source: INSEE

== See also ==
- Communes of the Eure department
