= Le Bec-Thomas =

- Commune
- Location of Le Bec-Thomas
- Location within France Location within Normandy
- Coordinates: 49°14′12″N 0°59′02″E
- Country: France
- Region: Normandy
- Department: Eure
- Arrondissement: Bernay
- Canton: Grand Bourgtheroulde
- Intercommunality: CA Seine-Eure

Government
  - Mayor (2020–2026): Jean-Luc Flambard
- Area^{1}: 1.4 km^{2} (0.54 sq mi)
- Highest elevation: 154 m (505 ft)
- Lowest elevation: 84 m (276 ft)
- Population (2023): 196
  - Density: 140/km^{2} (360/sq mi)
- Time zone: UTC+01:00 (CET)
  - Summer (DST): UTC+02:00 (CEST)
- INSEE/Postal code: 27053 /27370
- ^{1} French Land Register data, which excludes lakes, ponds, glaciers > 1 km^{2} (0.386 sq mi or 247 acres) and river estuaries.

Le Bec-Thomas (French pronunciation: [lə bɛk tɔmɑ]) is a village and commune in the department of Eure of the Normandy region in France. Le Bec-Thomas is part of the canton of Grand Bourgtheroulde and the arrondissement of Bernay. The INSEE code for Le Bec-Thomas is 27053, and the Le Bec-Thomas zip code is 27370.

== Geography ==
Le Bec-Thomas has an approximate altitude of 145 meters and an area of 1.40 km ². Its latitude and longitude are 49.234 degrees North and 0.983 degrees East.

== Population ==
Historical population
Year	Pop.	±% p.a.
1968	119	—
1975	123	+0.47%
1982	159	+3.74%
1990	190	+2.25%
1999	221	+1.69%
2007	224	+0.17%
2012	209	−1.38%
2017	219	+0.94%
2023	196	−1.83%
Source: INSEE

== See also ==
- Communes of the Eure department
