= Saint-Pierre-du-Bosguérard =

- Commune
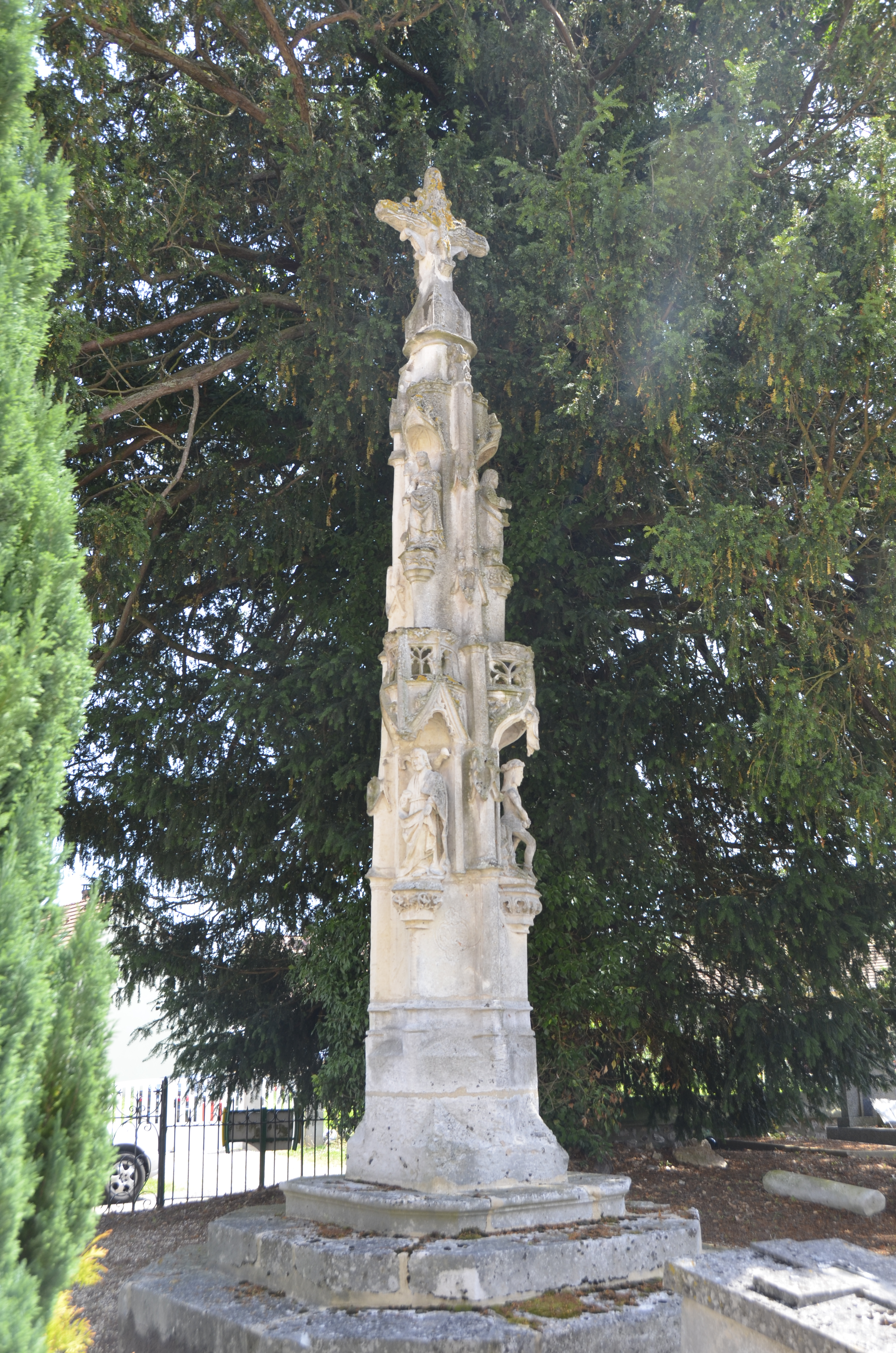
- The calvary in Saint-Pierre-du-Bosguérard

- Coat of arms
- Location of Saint-Pierre-du-Bosguérard
- Location within France Location within Normandy
- Coordinates: 49°15′55″N 0°52′49″E
- Country: France
- Region: Normandy
- Department: Eure
- Arrondissement: Bernay
- Canton: Grand Bourgtheroulde

Government
  - Mayor (2020–2026): Franck Haudréchy
- Area^{1}: 10.1 km^{2} (3.9 sq mi)
- Elevation: 179 m (587 ft)
- Highest elevation: 179 m (587 ft)
- Lowest elevation: 110 m (360 ft)
- Population (2023): 950
  - Density: 94/km^{2} (240/sq mi)
- Time zone: UTC+01:00 (CET)
  - Summer (DST): UTC+02:00 (CEST)
- INSEE/Postal code: 27595 /27370
- ^{1} French Land Register data, which excludes lakes, ponds, glaciers > 1 km^{2} (0.386 sq mi or 247 acres) and river estuaries.

Saint-Pierre-du-Bosguérard (French pronunciation: [sɛ̃ pjɛʁ dy boɡeʁaʁ]) is a commune in the Eure department in Normandy in northern France.

== Population ==
Historical population
Year	Pop.	±% p.a.
1968	183	—
1975	244	+4.20%
1982	631	+14.54%
1990	692	+1.16%
1999	844	+2.23%
2007	1,012	+2.30%
2012	1,076	+1.23%
2017	1,032	−0.83%
2023	950	−1.37%
Source: INSEE

== See also ==
- Communes of the Eure department
