= Voiscreville =

- Commune
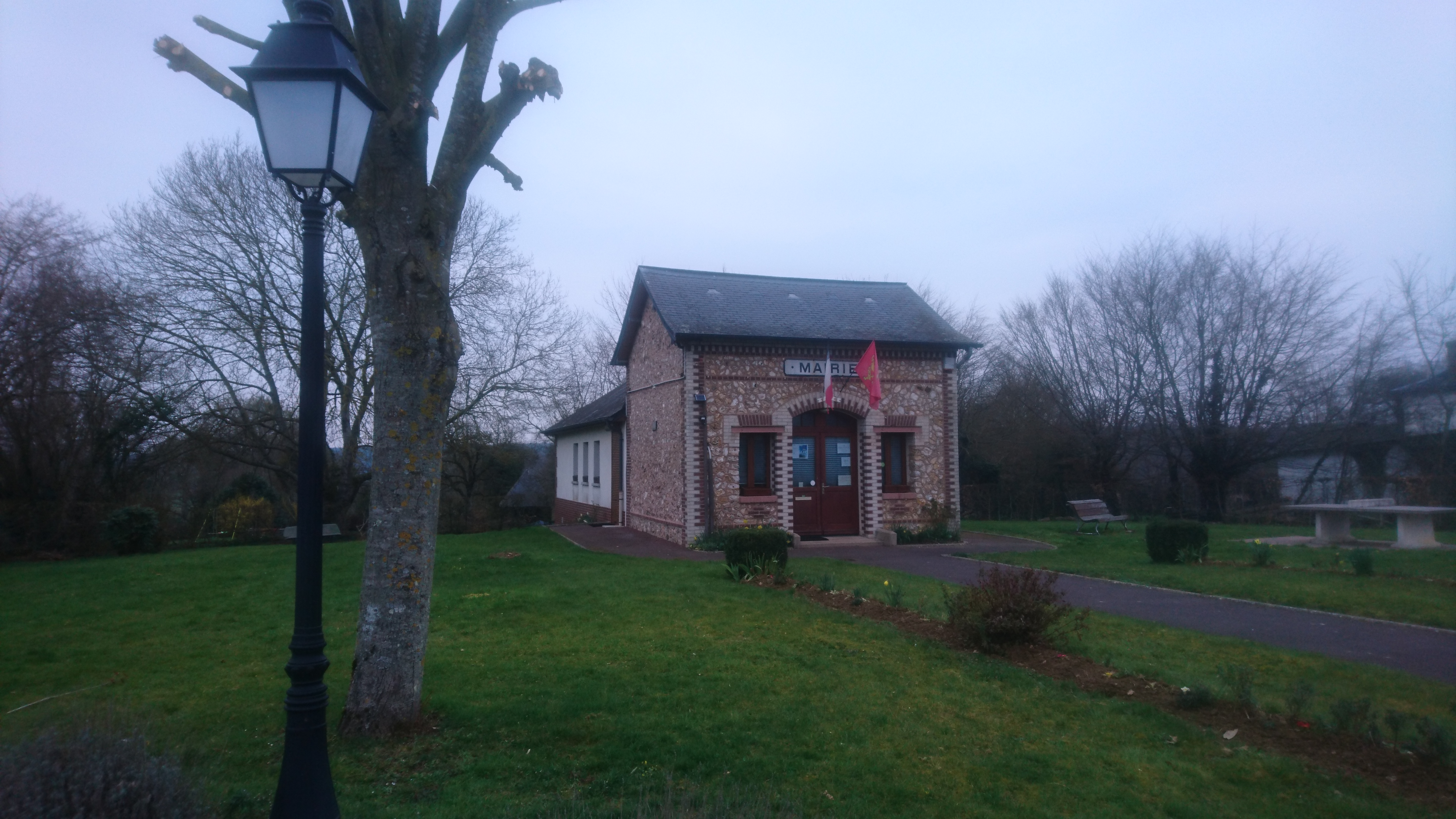
- The town hall in Voiscreville
- Location of Voiscreville
- Location within France Location within Normandy
- Coordinates: 49°16′54″N 0°46′16″E
- Country: France
- Region: Normandy
- Department: Eure
- Arrondissement: Bernay
- Canton: Grand Bourgtheroulde
- Intercommunality: Roumois Seine

Government
  - Mayor (2020–2026): Mélanie Petit
- Area^{1}: 1.69 km^{2} (0.65 sq mi)
- Elevation: 124 m (407 ft)
- Highest elevation: 136 m (446 ft)
- Lowest elevation: 83 m (272 ft)
- Population (2023): 117
  - Density: 69.2/km^{2} (179/sq mi)
- Time zone: UTC+01:00 (CET)
  - Summer (DST): UTC+02:00 (CEST)
- INSEE/Postal code: 27699 /27520
- ^{1} French Land Register data, which excludes lakes, ponds, glaciers > 1 km^{2} (0.386 sq mi or 247 acres) and river estuaries.

Voiscreville is a commune in the Eure department in Normandy in northern France.

== Population ==
Historical population
Year	Pop.	±% p.a.
1968	68	—
1975	86	+3.41%
1982	112	+3.85%
1990	114	+0.22%
1999	109	−0.50%
2007	108	−0.12%
2012	124	+2.80%
2017	124	+0.00%
2023	117	−0.96%
Source: INSEE

== See also ==
- Communes of the Eure department
