= Saint-Denis-des-Monts =

- Commune
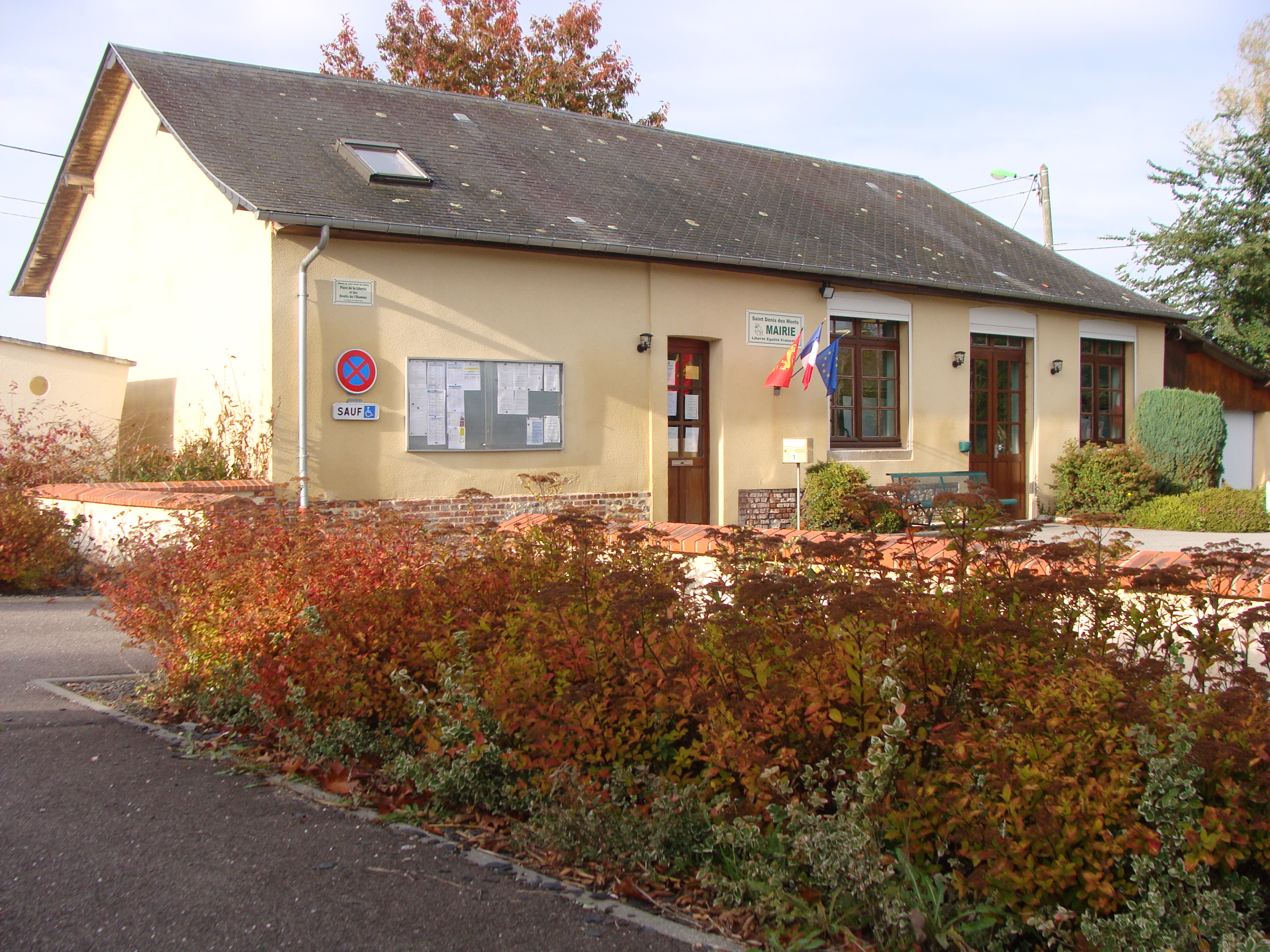
- The town hall in Saint-Denis-des-Monts
- Location of Saint-Denis-des-Monts
- Location within France Location within Normandy
- Coordinates: 49°15′35″N 0°48′44″E
- Country: France
- Region: Normandy
- Department: Eure
- Arrondissement: Bernay
- Canton: Grand Bourgtheroulde

Government
  - Mayor (2020–2026): Olivier Morin
- Area^{1}: 3.88 km^{2} (1.50 sq mi)
- Elevation: 147 m (482 ft)
- Highest elevation: 161 m (528 ft)
- Lowest elevation: 108 m (354 ft)
- Population (2023): 211
  - Density: 54.4/km^{2} (141/sq mi)
- Time zone: UTC+01:00 (CET)
  - Summer (DST): UTC+02:00 (CEST)
- INSEE/Postal code: 27531 /27520
- ^{1} French Land Register data, which excludes lakes, ponds, glaciers > 1 km^{2} (0.386 sq mi or 247 acres) and river estuaries.

Saint-Denis-des-Monts (French pronunciation: [sɛ̃ dəni de mɔ̃]) is a commune in the Eure department in Normandy in northern France.

== Population ==
Historical population
Year	Pop.	±% p.a.
1968	150	—
1975	139	−1.08%
1982	175	+3.34%
1990	185	+0.70%
1999	180	−0.30%
2007	194	+0.94%
2012	222	+2.73%
2017	211	−1.01%
2023	211	+0.00%
Source: INSEE

== See also ==
- Communes of the Eure department
