= Saint-Ouen-de-Pontcheuil =

- Commune
- Location of Saint-Ouen-de-Pontcheuil
- Location within France Location within Normandy
- Coordinates: 49°14′11″N 0°57′13″E
- Country: France
- Region: Normandy
- Department: Eure
- Arrondissement: Bernay
- Canton: Grand Bourgtheroulde

Government
  - Mayor (2020–2026): Daniel Duval
- Area^{1}: 1.17 km^{2} (0.45 sq mi)
- Elevation: 150 m (490 ft)
- Highest elevation: 162 m (531 ft)
- Lowest elevation: 100 m (330 ft)
- Population (2023): 102
  - Density: 87.2/km^{2} (226/sq mi)
- Time zone: UTC+01:00 (CET)
  - Summer (DST): UTC+02:00 (CEST)
- INSEE/Postal code: 27579 /27370
- ^{1} French Land Register data, which excludes lakes, ponds, glaciers > 1 km^{2} (0.386 sq mi or 247 acres) and river estuaries.

Saint-Ouen-de-Pontcheuil (French pronunciation: [sɛ̃.t‿wɛ̃ də pɔ̃ʃœj]) is a commune in the Eure department in Normandy in northern France.

== Population ==
Historical population
Year	Pop.	±% p.a.
1968	53	—
1975	57	+1.04%
1982	89	+6.57%
1990	108	+2.45%
1999	100	−0.85%
2007	100	+0.00%
2012	99	−0.20%
2017	95	−0.82%
2023	102	+1.19%
Source: INSEE

== See also ==
- Communes of the Eure department
