= Fouqueville =

- Commune
- Location of Fouqueville
- Location within France Location within Normandy
- Coordinates: 49°13′16″N 0°57′05″E
- Country: France
- Region: Normandy
- Department: Eure
- Arrondissement: Bernay
- Canton: Grand Bourgtheroulde

Government
  - Mayor (2020–2026): Didier Lemoine
- Area^{1}: 8.18 km^{2} (3.16 sq mi)
- Elevation: 162 m (531 ft)
- Highest elevation: 166 m (545 ft)
- Lowest elevation: 108 m (354 ft)
- Population (2023): 444
  - Density: 54.3/km^{2} (141/sq mi)
- Time zone: UTC+01:00 (CET)
  - Summer (DST): UTC+02:00 (CEST)
- INSEE/Postal code: 27261 /27370
- ^{1} French Land Register data, which excludes lakes, ponds, glaciers > 1 km^{2} (0.386 sq mi or 247 acres) and river estuaries.

Fouqueville (French pronunciation: [fukvil]) is a commune in the Eure department in the Normandy region in northern France.

== Population ==
Historical population
Year	Pop.	±% p.a.
1968	199	—
1975	283	+5.16%
1982	413	+5.55%
1990	433	+0.59%
1999	424	−0.23%
2007	401	−0.69%
2012	459	+2.74%
2017	460	+0.04%
2023	444	−0.59%
Source: INSEE

== See also ==
- Communes of the Eure department
