= Saint-Germain-de-Pasquier =

- Commune
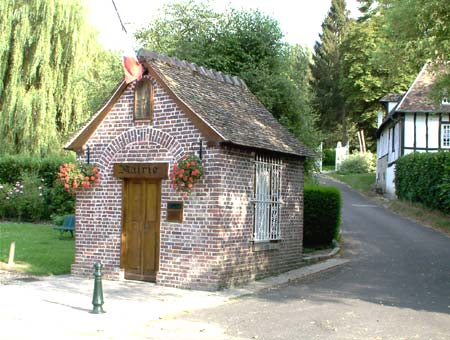
- The town hall in Saint-Germain-de-Pasquier - the smallest in France
- Location of Saint-Germain-de-Pasquier
- Location within France Location within Normandy
- Coordinates: 49°14′47″N 1°00′02″E
- Country: France
- Region: Normandy
- Department: Eure
- Arrondissement: Bernay
- Canton: Grand Bourgtheroulde
- Intercommunality: CA Seine-Eure

Government
  - Mayor (2020–2026): Laurence Laffillé
- Area^{1}: 1.99 km^{2} (0.77 sq mi)
- Elevation: 129 m (423 ft)
- Highest elevation: 145 m (476 ft)
- Lowest elevation: 64 m (210 ft)
- Population (2023): 122
  - Density: 61.3/km^{2} (159/sq mi)
- Time zone: UTC+01:00 (CET)
  - Summer (DST): UTC+02:00 (CEST)
- INSEE/Postal code: 27545 /27370
- ^{1} French Land Register data, which excludes lakes, ponds, glaciers > 1 km^{2} (0.386 sq mi or 247 acres) and river estuaries.

Saint-Germain-de-Pasquier is a commune in the Eure department in Normandy in northern France.

== Population ==
Historical population
Year	Pop.	±% p.a.
1968	33	—
1975	90	+15.41%
1982	133	+5.74%
1990	105	−2.91%
1999	139	+3.17%
2007	139	+0.00%
2012	139	+0.00%
2017	126	−1.94%
2023	122	−0.54%
Source: INSEE

== See also ==
- Communes of the Eure department
