= Thénouville =

- Commune
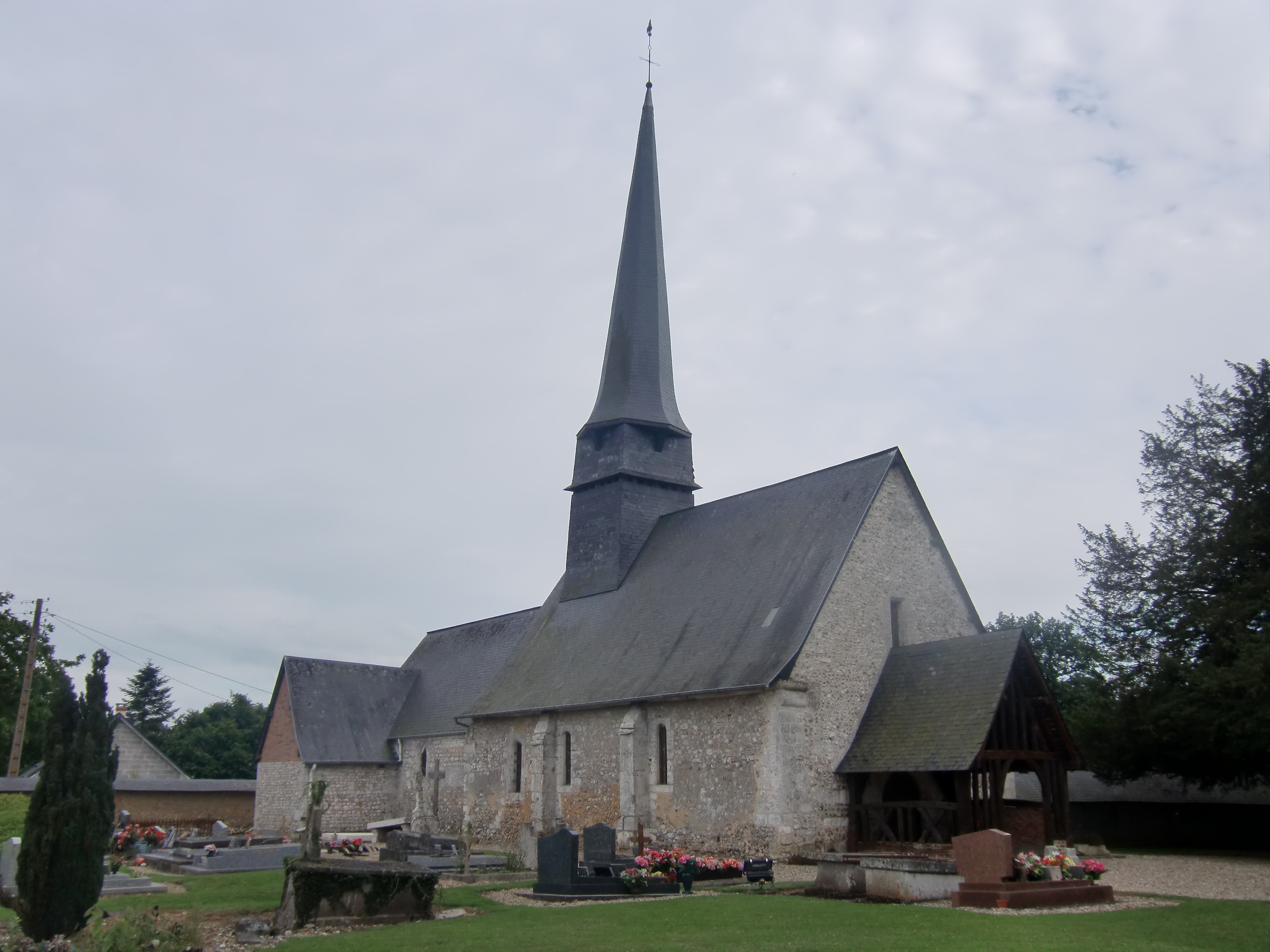
- The church in Bosc-Renoult-en-Roumois
- Location of Thénouville
- Location within France Location within Normandy
- Coordinates: 49°17′42″N 0°46′37″E
- Country: France
- Region: Normandy
- Department: Eure
- Arrondissement: Bernay
- Canton: Grand Bourgtheroulde
- Intercommunality: Roumois Seine

Government
  - Mayor (2020–2026): Laurent Debeerst
- Area^{1}: 13.19 km^{2} (5.09 sq mi)
- Population (2023): 1,014
  - Density: 76.88/km^{2} (199.1/sq mi)
- Time zone: UTC+01:00 (CET)
  - Summer (DST): UTC+02:00 (CEST)
- INSEE/Postal code: 27089 /27520
- ^{1} French Land Register data, which excludes lakes, ponds, glaciers > 1 km^{2} (0.386 sq mi or 247 acres) and river estuaries.

Thénouville (French pronunciation: [tenuvil]) is a commune in the department of Eure, northern France. The municipality was established on 1 January 2017 by merger of the former communes of Bosc-Renoult-en-Roumois (the seat) and Theillement. On 1 January 2018, the former commune of Touville was merged into Thénouville.

== See also ==
- Communes of the Eure department
