= Saint-Léger-du-Gennetey =

- Commune
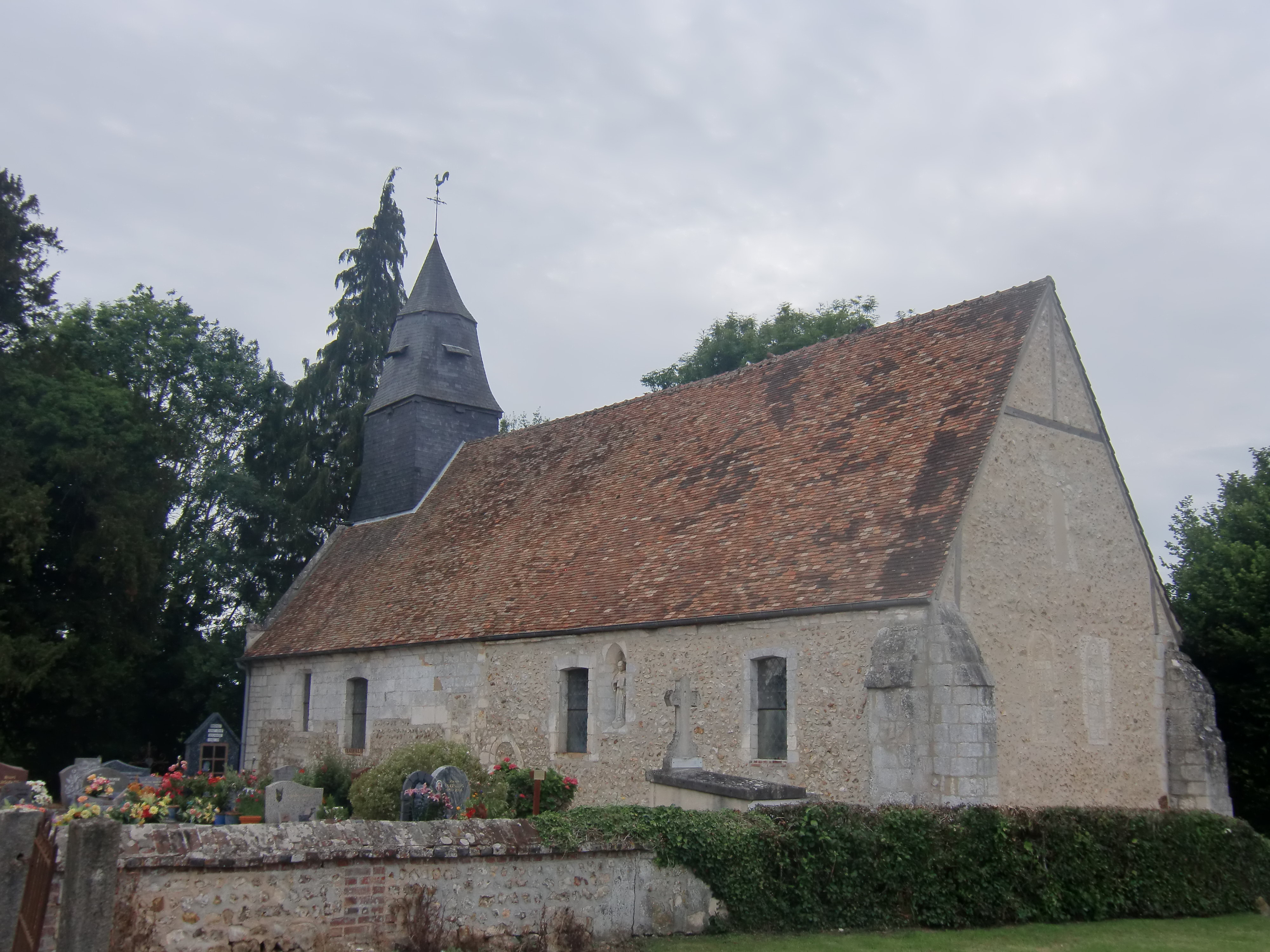
- The church in Saint-Léger-du-Gennetey
- Location of Saint-Léger-du-Gennetey
- Location within France Location within Normandy
- Coordinates: 49°17′27″N 0°45′11″E
- Country: France
- Region: Normandy
- Department: Eure
- Arrondissement: Bernay
- Canton: Grand Bourgtheroulde

Government
  - Mayor (2020–2026): Philippe Romain
- Area^{1}: 3.27 km^{2} (1.26 sq mi)
- Elevation: 91 m (299 ft)
- Highest elevation: 145 m (476 ft)
- Lowest elevation: 76 m (249 ft)
- Population (2023): 166
  - Density: 50.8/km^{2} (131/sq mi)
- Time zone: UTC+01:00 (CET)
  - Summer (DST): UTC+02:00 (CEST)
- INSEE/Postal code: 27558 /27520
- ^{1} French Land Register data, which excludes lakes, ponds, glaciers > 1 km^{2} (0.386 sq mi or 247 acres) and river estuaries.

Saint-Léger-du-Gennetey (French pronunciation: [sɛ̃ leʒe dy ʒɛntɛ]) is a commune in the Eure department in Normandy in northern France.

== Population ==
Historical population
Year	Pop.	±% p.a.
1968	96	—
1975	82	−2.23%
1982	88	+1.01%
1990	89	+0.14%
1999	106	+1.96%
2007	154	+4.78%
2012	176	+2.71%
2017	182	+0.67%
2023	166	−1.52%
Source: INSEE

== See also ==
- Communes of the Eure department
