= Amfreville-Saint-Amand =

- Commune
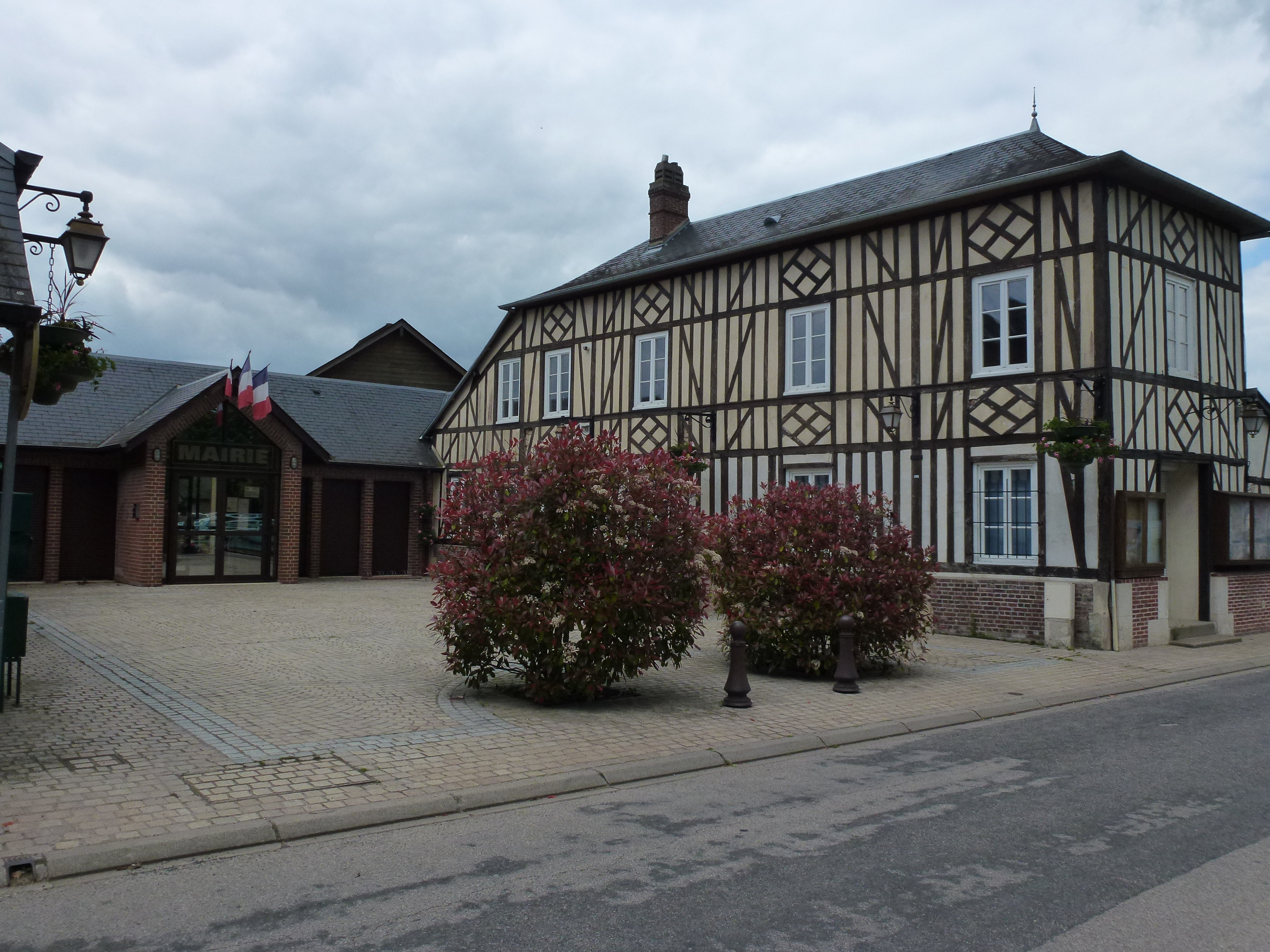
- The town hall in Amfreville-la-Campagne
- Location of Amfreville-Saint-Amand
- Location within France Location within Normandy
- Coordinates: 49°12′47″N 0°55′52″E
- Country: France
- Region: Normandy
- Department: Eure
- Arrondissement: Bernay
- Canton: Grand Bourgtheroulde

Government
  - Mayor (2020–2026): Jérôme Débus
- Area^{1}: 9.62 km^{2} (3.71 sq mi)
- Population (2023): 1,207
  - Density: 125/km^{2} (325/sq mi)
- Time zone: UTC+01:00 (CET)
  - Summer (DST): UTC+02:00 (CEST)
- INSEE/Postal code: 27011 /27370
- ^{1} French Land Register data, which excludes lakes, ponds, glaciers > 1 km^{2} (0.386 sq mi or 247 acres) and river estuaries.

Amfreville-Saint-Amand (French pronunciation: [ɑ̃fʁəvil sɛ̃.t‿amɑ̃]) is a commune in the department of Eure, northern France. The municipality was established on 1 January 2016 by merger of the former communes of Amfreville-la-Campagne and Saint-Amand-des-Hautes-Terres.

== See also ==
- Communes of the Eure department
