= Boissey-le-Châtel =

- Commune
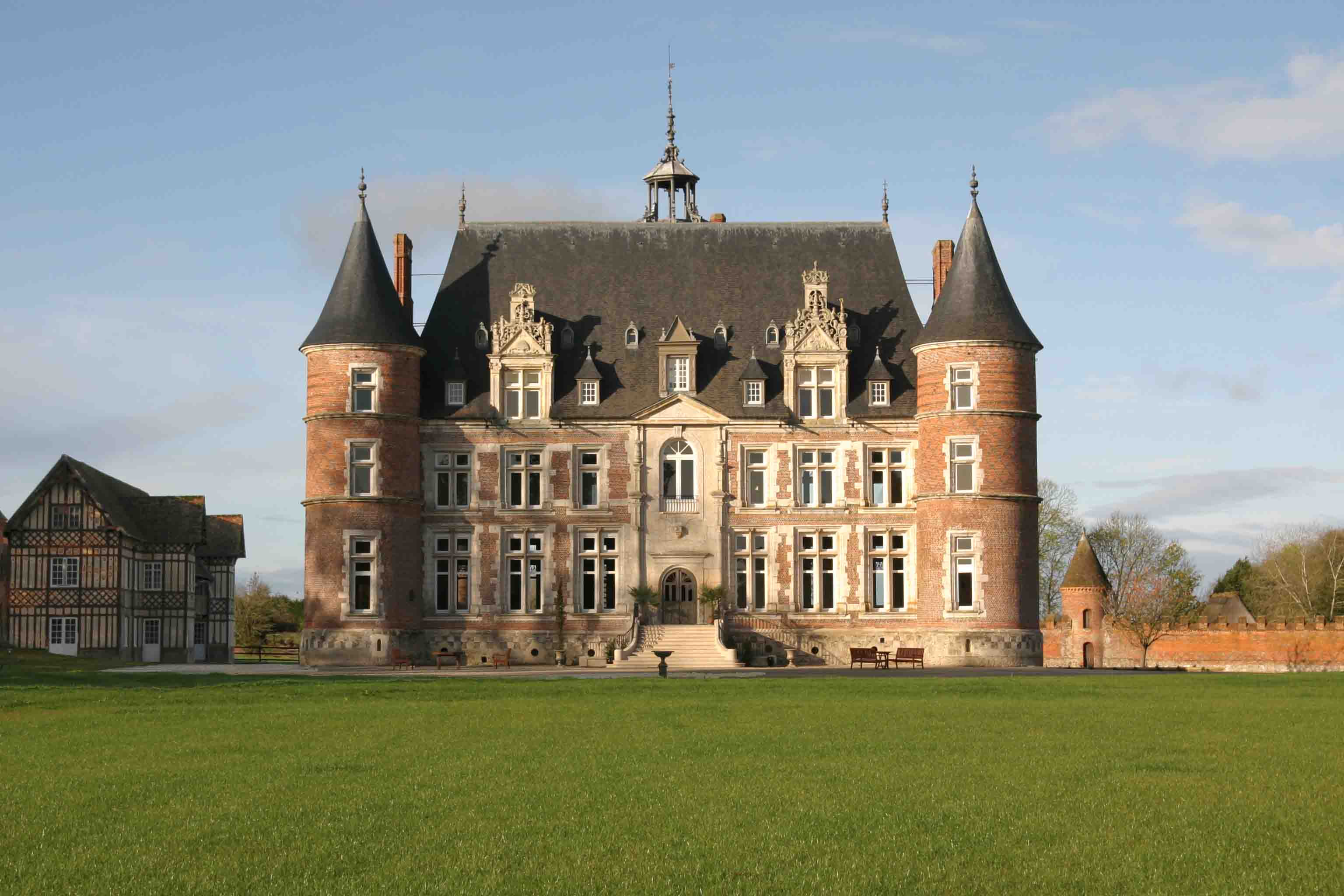
- Chateau of Tilly

- Coat of arms
- Location of Boissey-le-Châtel
- Location within France Location within Normandy
- Coordinates: 49°16′18″N 0°47′05″E
- Country: France
- Region: Normandy
- Department: Eure
- Arrondissement: Bernay
- Canton: Grand Bourgtheroulde

Government
  - Mayor (2020–2026): Laurent Duchateau
- Area^{1}: 4.38 km^{2} (1.69 sq mi)
- Elevation: 150 m (490 ft)
- Highest elevation: 156 m (512 ft)
- Lowest elevation: 87 m (285 ft)
- Population (2023): 903
  - Density: 206/km^{2} (534/sq mi)
- Time zone: UTC+01:00 (CET)
  - Summer (DST): UTC+02:00 (CEST)
- INSEE/Postal code: 27077 /27520
- ^{1} French Land Register data, which excludes lakes, ponds, glaciers > 1 km^{2} (0.386 sq mi or 247 acres) and river estuaries.

Boissey-le-Châtel (French pronunciation: [bwasɛ lə ʃatɛl]) is a commune in the Eure department in Normandy in northern France.

== Population ==
Historical population
Year	Pop.	±% p.a.
1968	533	—
1975	601	+1.73%
1982	700	+2.20%
1990	674	−0.47%
1999	687	+0.21%
2007	827	+2.35%
2012	890	+1.48%
2017	880	−0.23%
2023	903	+0.43%
Source: INSEE

== See also ==
- Communes of the Eure department
