= La Saussaye =

- Commune
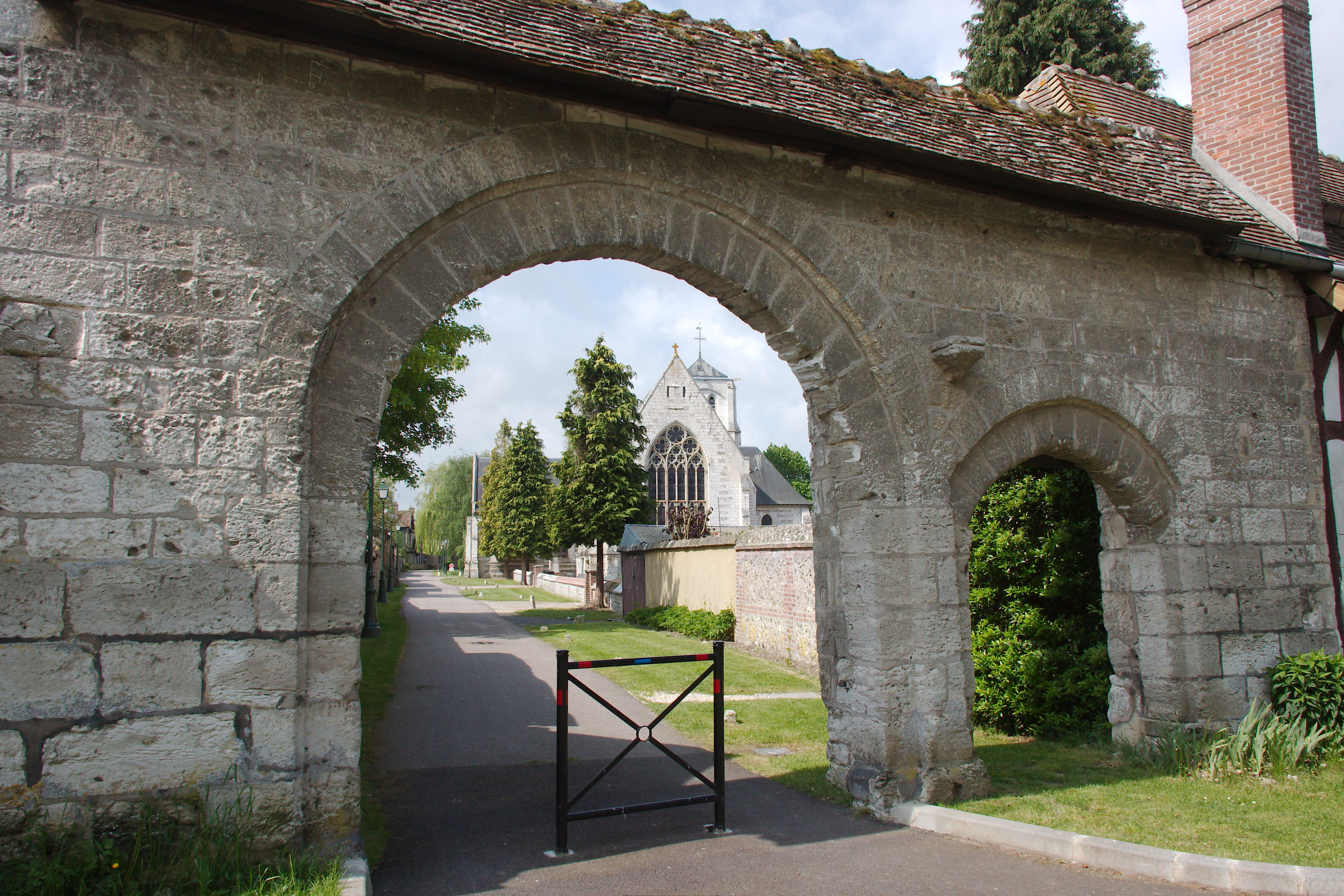
- The canons' gate in La Saussaye
- Location of La Saussaye
- Location within France Location within Normandy
- Coordinates: 49°15′30″N 0°58′55″E
- Country: France
- Region: Normandy
- Department: Eure
- Arrondissement: Bernay
- Canton: Grand Bourgtheroulde
- Intercommunality: CA Seine-Eure

Government
  - Mayor (2020–2026): Didier Guérinot
- Area^{1}: 3.53 km^{2} (1.36 sq mi)
- Elevation: 137 m (449 ft)
- Highest elevation: 149 m (489 ft)
- Lowest elevation: 73 m (240 ft)
- Population (2023): 1,941
  - Density: 550/km^{2} (1,420/sq mi)
- Time zone: UTC+01:00 (CET)
  - Summer (DST): UTC+02:00 (CEST)
- INSEE/Postal code: 27616 /27370
- ^{1} French Land Register data, which excludes lakes, ponds, glaciers > 1 km^{2} (0.386 sq mi or 247 acres) and river estuaries.

La Saussaye (French pronunciation: [la sosɛ]) is a commune in the Eure department in Normandy in northern France.

== Population ==
Historical population
Year	Pop.	±% p.a.
1968	1,370	—
1975	1,542	+1.70%
1982	1,502	−0.37%
1990	1,840	+2.57%
1999	1,954	+0.67%
2007	1,930	−0.15%
2012	1,876	−0.57%
2017	1,872	−0.04%
2023	1,941	+0.61%
Source: INSEE

== See also ==
- Communes of the Eure department
