= Canton of Grand Bourgtheroulde =

Canton in Normandy, France

Coordinates: 49.30°N 0.87°E

The canton of Grand Bourgtheroulde (before March 2020: canton of Bourgtheroulde-Infreville) is an administrative division of the Eure department, northern France. Its borders were modified at the French canton reorganisation which came into effect in March 2015. Its seat is in Grand Bourgtheroulde.

It consists of the following communes:

1. Amfreville-Saint-Amand
2. Le Bec-Thomas
3. Boissey-le-Châtel
4. Bosroumois
5. Flancourt-Crescy-en-Roumois
6. Fouqueville
7. Grand Bourgtheroulde
8. La Harengère
9. La Haye-du-Theil
10. Les Monts du Roumois
11. Saint-Cyr-la-Campagne
12. Saint-Denis-des-Monts
13. Saint-Didier-des-Bois
14. Saint-Germain-de-Pasquier
15. Saint-Léger-du-Gennetey
16. Saint-Ouen-de-Pontcheuil
17. Saint-Ouen-du-Tilleul
18. Saint-Philbert-sur-Boissey
19. Saint-Pierre-des-Fleurs
20. Saint-Pierre-du-Bosguérard
21. La Saussaye
22. Thénouville
23. Le Thuit-de-l'Oison
24. Tourville-la-Campagne
25. Voiscreville
