= La Noë-Poulain =

- Commune
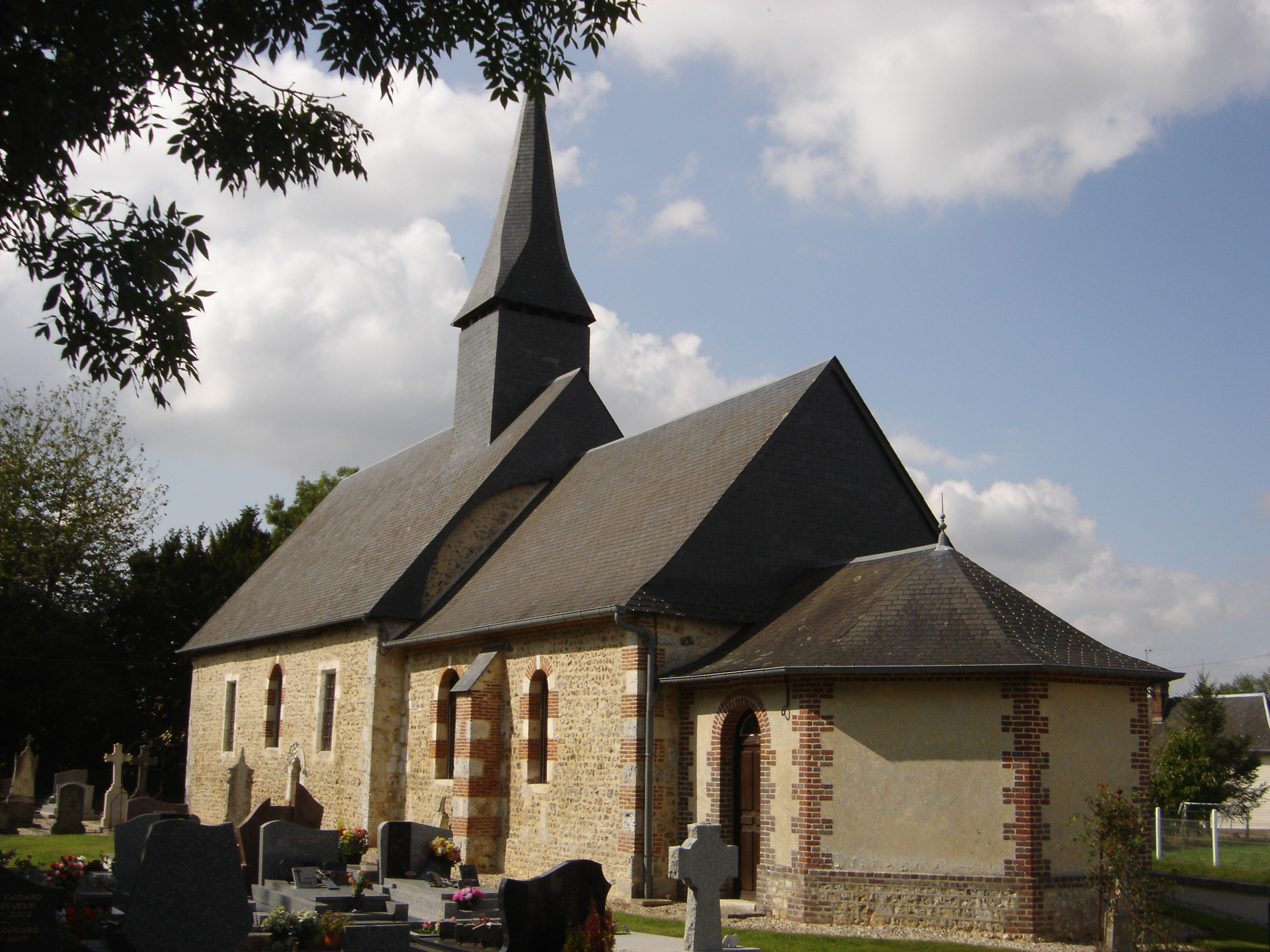
- The church in La Noë-Poulain
- Location of La Noë-Poulain
- Location within France Location within Normandy
- Coordinates: 49°16′04″N 0°31′05″E
- Country: France
- Region: Normandy
- Department: Eure
- Arrondissement: Bernay
- Canton: Beuzeville

Government
  - Mayor (2020–2026): André Valentin
- Area^{1}: 4.7 km^{2} (1.8 sq mi)
- Elevation: 160 m (520 ft)
- Highest elevation: 166 m (545 ft)
- Lowest elevation: 95 m (312 ft)
- Population (2023): 248
  - Density: 53/km^{2} (140/sq mi)
- Time zone: UTC+01:00 (CET)
  - Summer (DST): UTC+02:00 (CEST)
- INSEE/Postal code: 27435 /27560
- ^{1} French Land Register data, which excludes lakes, ponds, glaciers > 1 km^{2} (0.386 sq mi or 247 acres) and river estuaries.

La Noë-Poulain (French pronunciation: [la nɔe pulɛ̃]) is a commune in the Eure department in Normandy in northern France.

== Geography ==
The commune along with another 69 communes shares part of a 4,747 hectare, Natura 2000 conservation area, called Risle, Guiel, Charentonne.

== Population ==
Historical population
| Year | Pop. | ±% p.a. |
|---|---|---|
| 1968 | 136 | — |
| 1975 | 156 | +1.98% |
| 1982 | 167 | +0.98% |
| 1990 | 159 | −0.61% |
| 1999 | 153 | −0.43% |
| 2007 | 182 | +2.19% |
| 2012 | 223 | +4.15% |
| 2017 | 272 | +4.05% |
| 2023 | 248 | −1.53% |
Source: INSEE

== See also ==
- Communes of the Eure department
