= Saint-Éloi =

Saint-Éloi (French pronunciation: [sɛ̃telwa]; French for Saint Eligius) may refer to:

- Saint-Éloi, Quebec, Canada
- Saint-Éloi, Ain, France
- Saint-Éloi, Creuse, France
- Saint-Éloi, Nièvre, France
- Saint-Éloi-de-Fourques, Eure, France
- Church of Saint-Éloi, Dunkirk

== See also ==
- Saint-Éloy (disambiguation)
- Sint-Elooi, Belgium (also known as St. Eloi near Ypres)
