= Neuville-sur-Authou =

- Commune
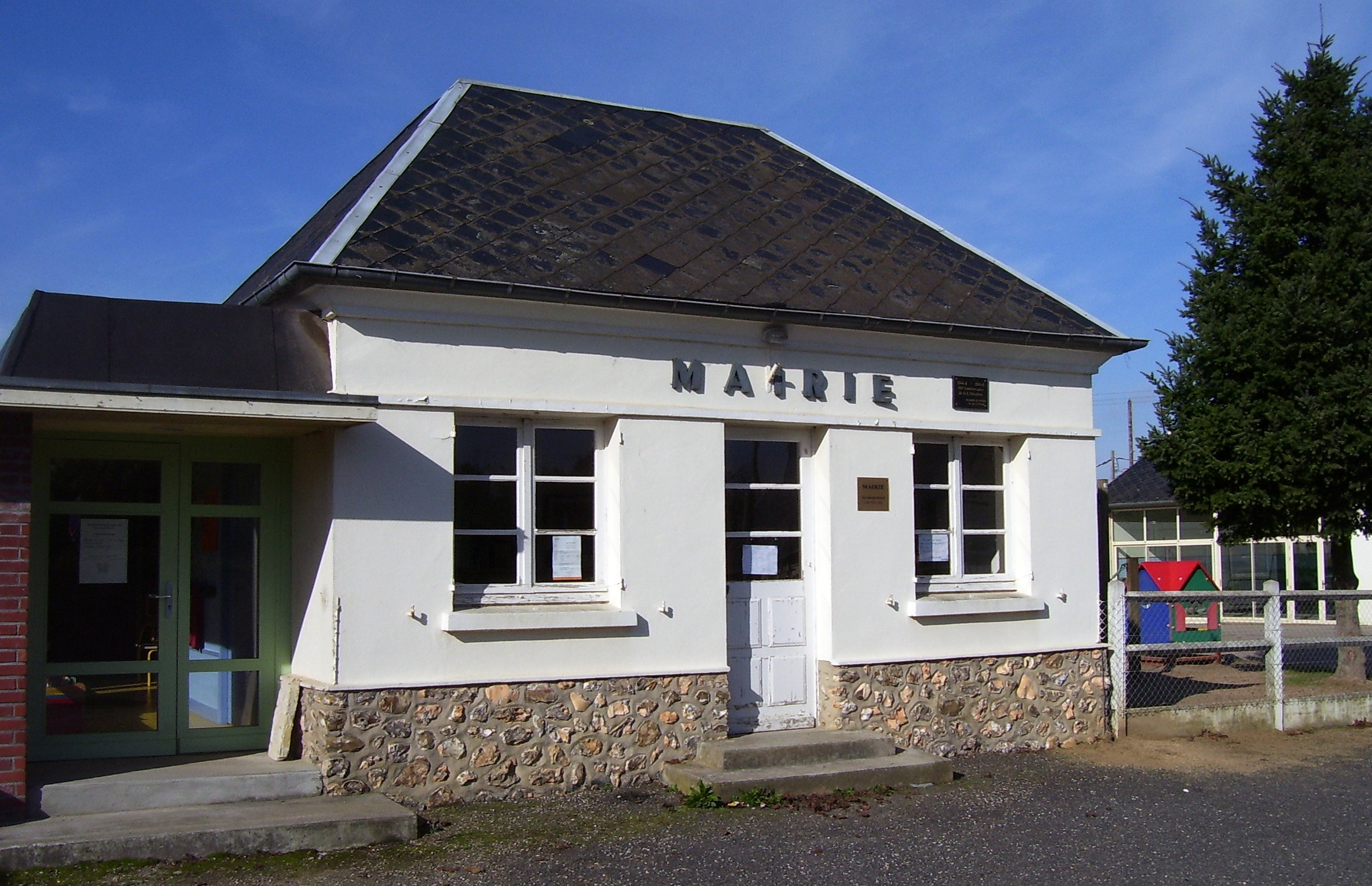
- Town hall
- Location of Neuville-sur-Authou
- Location within France Location within Normandy
- Coordinates: 49°12′44″N 0°38′18″E
- Country: France
- Region: Normandy
- Department: Eure
- Arrondissement: Bernay
- Canton: Brionne

Government
  - Mayor (2020–2026): Florence Declercq
- Area^{1}: 5.54 km^{2} (2.14 sq mi)
- Elevation: 149 m (489 ft)
- Highest elevation: 167 m (548 ft)
- Lowest elevation: 85 m (279 ft)
- Population (2023): 191
  - Density: 34.5/km^{2} (89.3/sq mi)
- Time zone: UTC+01:00 (CET)
  - Summer (DST): UTC+02:00 (CEST)
- INSEE/Postal code: 27433 /27800
- ^{1} French Land Register data, which excludes lakes, ponds, glaciers > 1 km^{2} (0.386 sq mi or 247 acres) and river estuaries.

Neuville-sur-Authou (French pronunciation: [nøvil syʁ otu], literally Neuville on Authou) is a commune in the Eure department in Normandy in northern France.

== Population ==
Historical population
Year	Pop.	±% p.a.
1968	141	—
1975	114	−2.99%
1982	121	+0.85%
1990	126	+0.51%
1999	128	+0.18%
2007	182	+4.50%
2012	191	+0.97%
2017	194	+0.31%
2023	191	−0.26%
Source: INSEE

== See also ==
- Communes of the Eure department
