= La Haye-de-Calleville =

- Commune
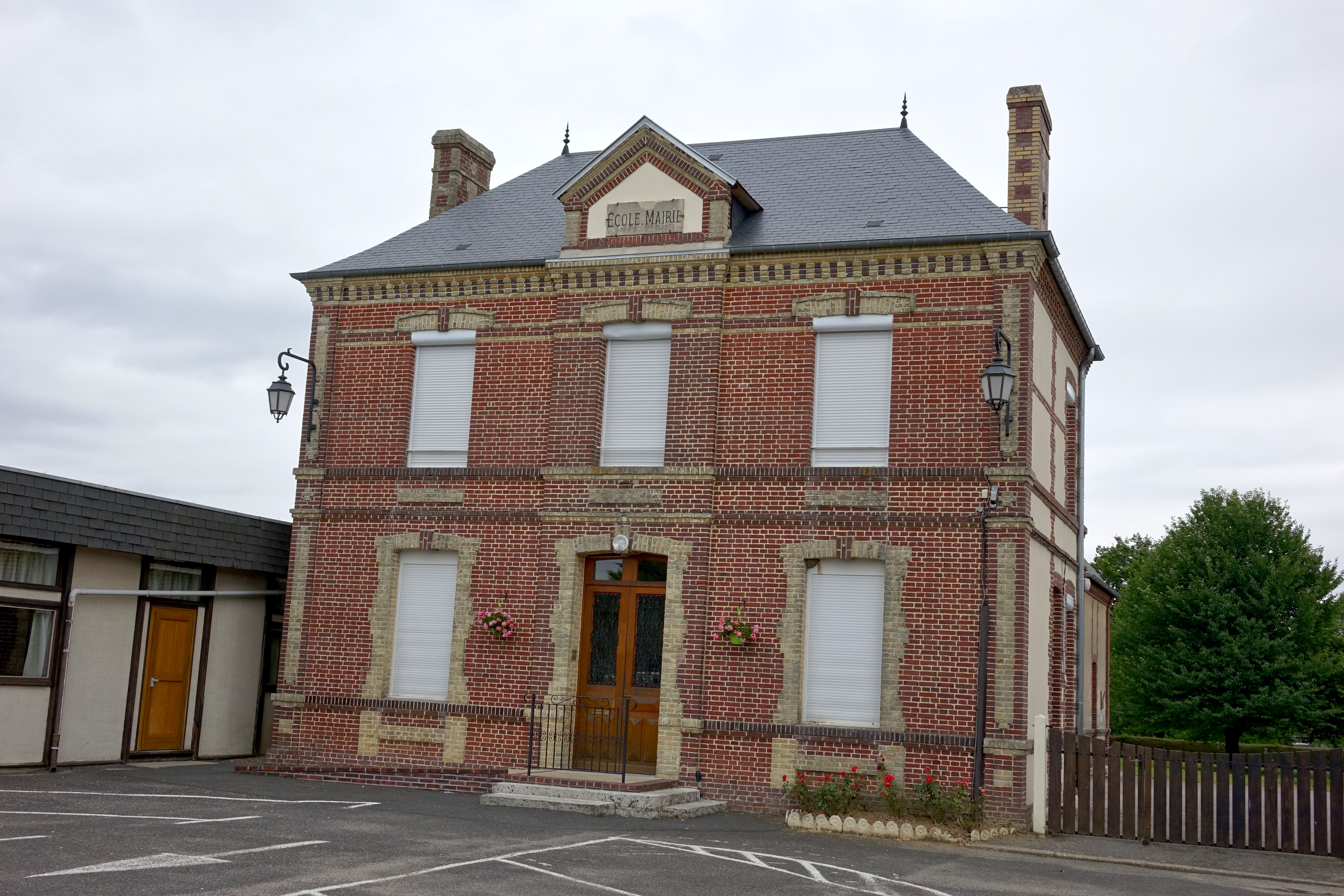
- The town hall in La Haye-de-Calleville
- Location of La Haye-de-Calleville
- Location within France Location within Normandy
- Coordinates: 49°11′14″N 0°47′11″E
- Country: France
- Region: Normandy
- Department: Eure
- Arrondissement: Bernay
- Canton: Brionne

Government
  - Mayor (2020–2026): Jean-Baptiste Voisin
- Area^{1}: 2.95 km^{2} (1.14 sq mi)
- Elevation: 144 m (472 ft)
- Highest elevation: 143 m (469 ft)
- Lowest elevation: 68 m (223 ft)
- Population (2023): 253
  - Density: 85.8/km^{2} (222/sq mi)
- Time zone: UTC+01:00 (CET)
  - Summer (DST): UTC+02:00 (CEST)
- INSEE/Postal code: 27318 /27800
- ^{1} French Land Register data, which excludes lakes, ponds, glaciers > 1 km^{2} (0.386 sq mi or 247 acres) and river estuaries.

La Haye-de-Calleville (French pronunciation: [la ɛ də kalvil], literally La Haye of Calleville) is a commune in the Eure department in northern France.

== Population ==
Historical population
Year	Pop.	±% p.a.
1968	233	—
1975	218	−0.95%
1982	207	−0.74%
1990	218	+0.65%
1999	221	+0.15%
2007	276	+2.82%
2012	291	+1.06%
2017	265	−1.85%
2023	253	−0.77%
Source: INSEE

== See also ==
- Communes of the Eure department
