= Franqueville =

Franqueville may refer to several communes in France:

- Franqueville, Aisne
- Franqueville, Eure
- Franqueville, Somme
- Franqueville-Saint-Pierre, in the Seine-Maritime département
