= Livet-sur-Authou =

- Commune
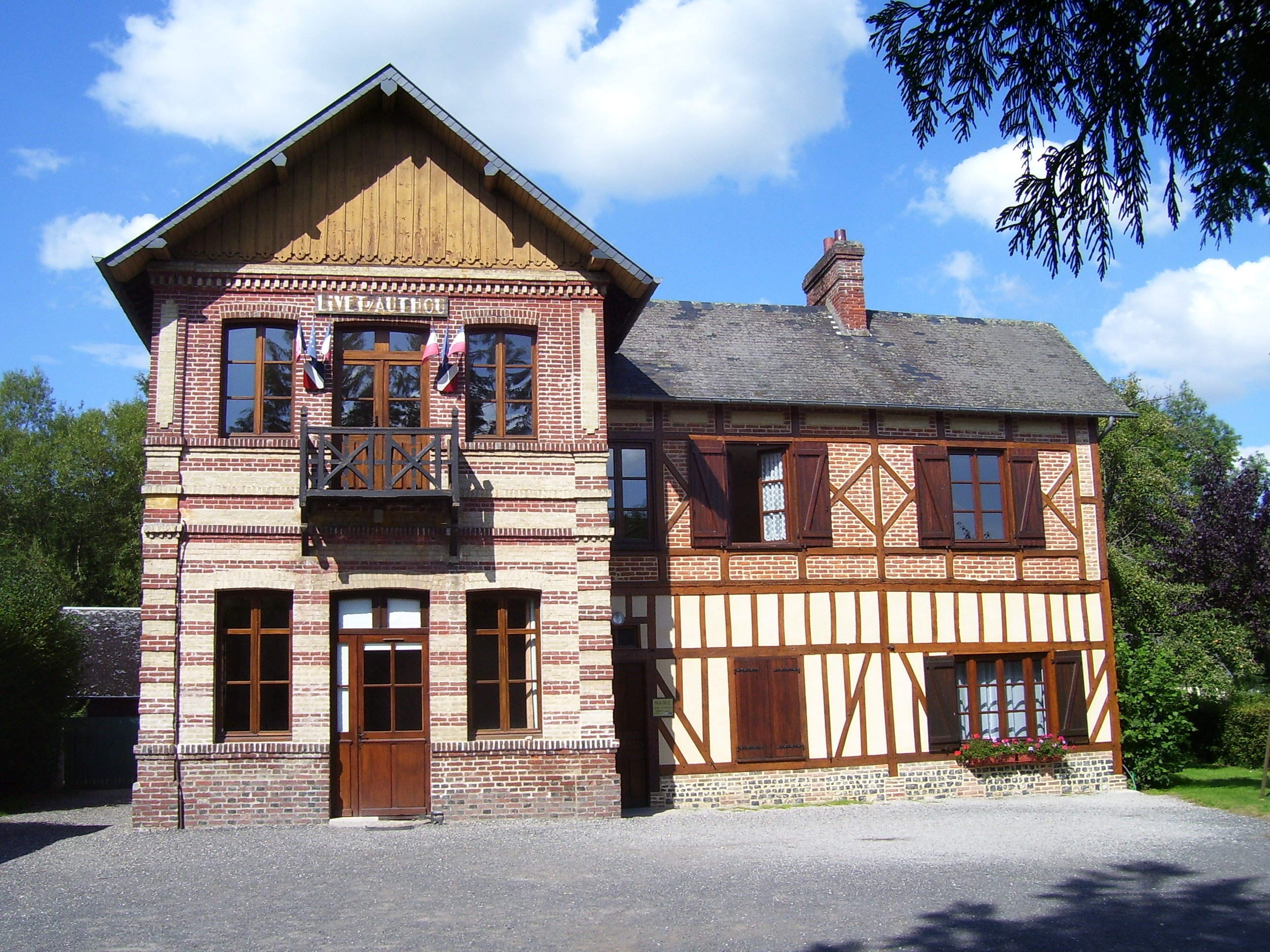
- Town hall

- Coat of arms
- Location of Livet-sur-Authou
- Location within France Location within Normandy
- Coordinates: 49°13′44″N 0°40′05″E
- Country: France
- Region: Normandy
- Department: Eure
- Arrondissement: Bernay
- Canton: Brionne

Government
  - Mayor (2020–2026): Bruno Cottard
- Area^{1}: 3.9 km^{2} (1.5 sq mi)
- Elevation: 126 m (413 ft)
- Highest elevation: 133 m (436 ft)
- Lowest elevation: 51 m (167 ft)
- Population (2023): 163
  - Density: 42/km^{2} (110/sq mi)
- Time zone: UTC+01:00 (CET)
  - Summer (DST): UTC+02:00 (CEST)
- INSEE/Postal code: 27371 /27800
- ^{1} French Land Register data, which excludes lakes, ponds, glaciers > 1 km^{2} (0.386 sq mi or 247 acres) and river estuaries.

Livet-sur-Authou (French pronunciation: [livɛ syʁ otu], literally Livet on Authou) is a commune in the Eure department in Normandy in northern France.

== Geography ==
The commune along with another 69 communes shares part of a 4,747 hectare, Natura 2000 conservation area, called Risle, Guiel, Charentonne.

== Population ==
Historical population
Year	Pop.	±% p.a.
1968	172	—
1975	194	+1.73%
1982	178	−1.22%
1990	126	−4.23%
1999	155	+2.33%
2007	138	−1.44%
2012	148	+1.41%
2017	150	+0.27%
2023	163	+1.39%
Source: INSEE

== See also ==
- Communes of the Eure department
