= Grosley-sur-Risle =

- Commune
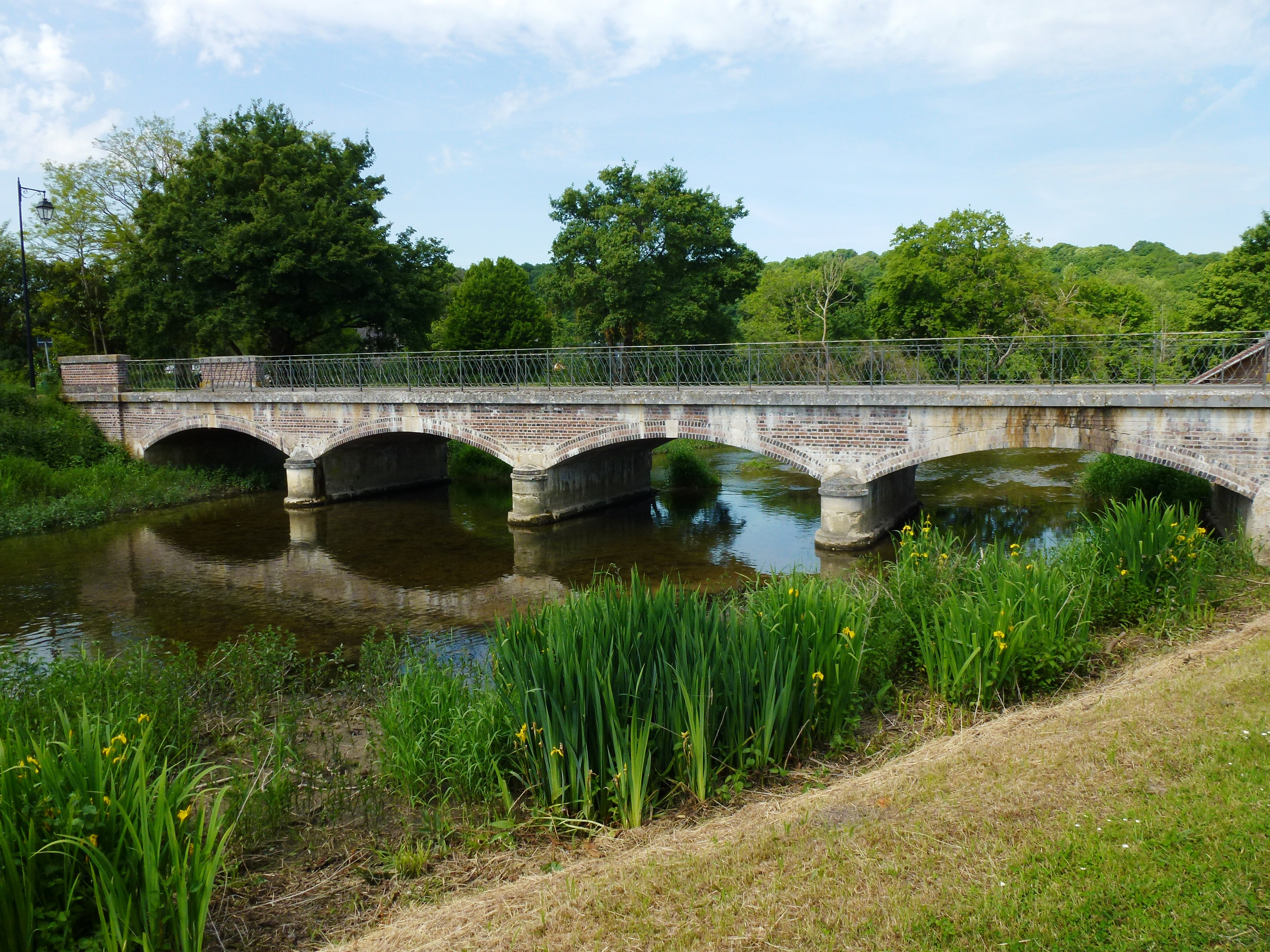
- Bridge over the Risle

- Coat of arms
- Location of Grosley-sur-Risle
- Location within France Location within Normandy
- Coordinates: 49°02′48″N 0°48′14″E
- Country: France
- Region: Normandy
- Department: Eure
- Arrondissement: Bernay
- Canton: Brionne

Government
  - Mayor (2020–2026): Dominique Civel
- Area^{1}: 13.18 km^{2} (5.09 sq mi)
- Elevation: 146 m (479 ft)
- Highest elevation: 162 m (531 ft)
- Lowest elevation: 90 m (300 ft)
- Population (2023): 522
  - Density: 39.6/km^{2} (103/sq mi)
- Time zone: UTC+01:00 (CET)
  - Summer (DST): UTC+02:00 (CEST)
- INSEE/Postal code: 27300 /27170
- ^{1} French Land Register data, which excludes lakes, ponds, glaciers > 1 km^{2} (0.386 sq mi or 247 acres) and river estuaries.

Grosley-sur-Risle (French pronunciation: [ɡʁɔlɛ syʁ ʁil], literally Grosley on Risle) is a commune just outside Beaumont-le-Roger in the Eure department in northern France. It has the river Risle running through it.

== Geography ==
The commune along with another 69 communes shares part of a 4,747 hectare, Natura 2000 conservation area, called Risle, Guiel, Charentonne.

== Population ==
Historical population
Year	Pop.	±% p.a.
1968	417	—
1975	524	+3.32%
1982	502	−0.61%
1990	507	+0.12%
1999	493	−0.31%
2007	557	+1.54%
2012	537	−0.73%
2017	523	−0.53%
2023	522	−0.03%
Source: INSEE

== See also ==
- Communes of the Eure department
