= Brétigny, Eure =

Brétigny
- Commune
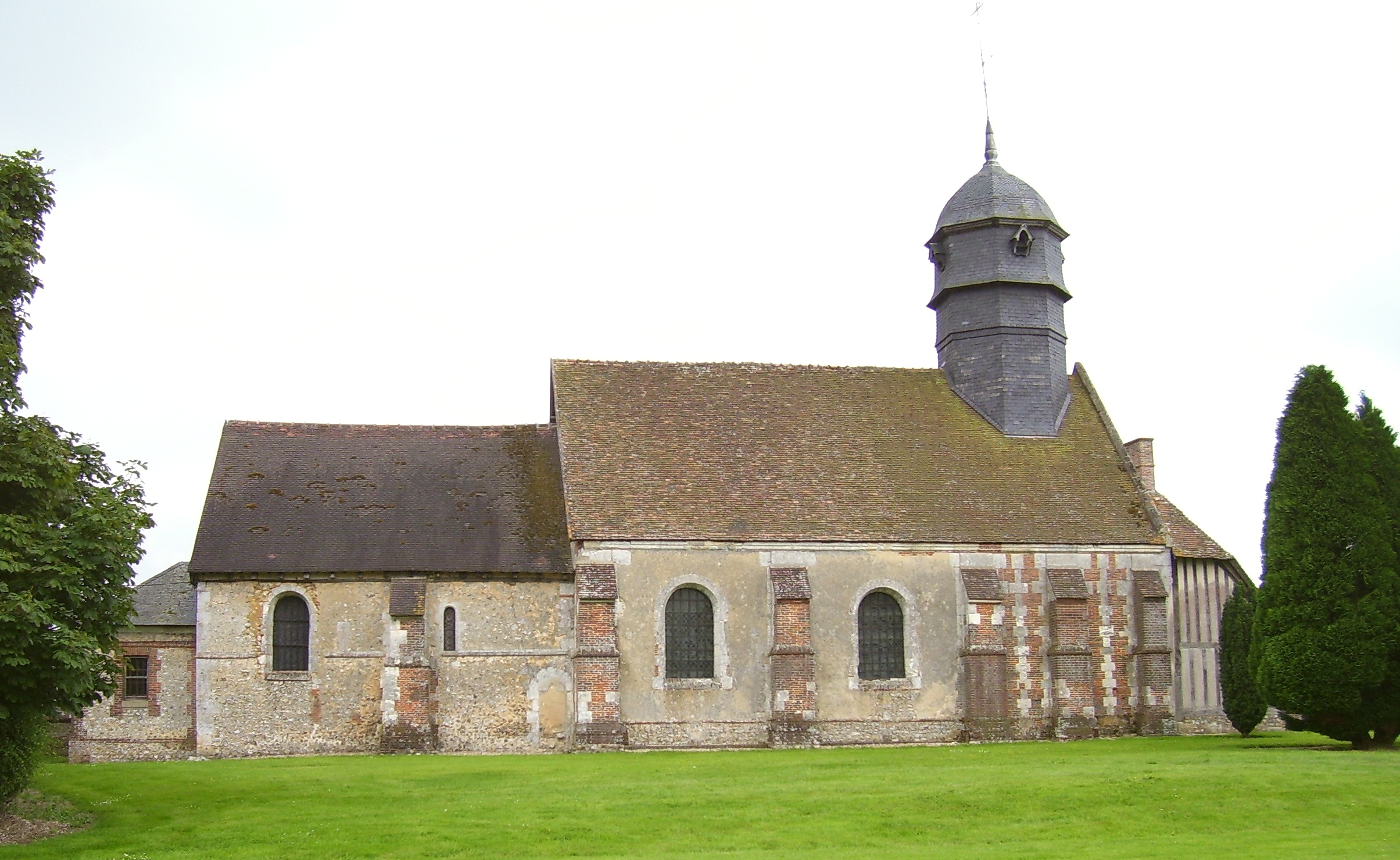
- The church in Brétigny
- Location of Brétigny
- Location within France Location within Normandy
- Coordinates: 49°12′52″N 0°40′39″E
- Country: France
- Region: Normandy
- Department: Eure
- Arrondissement: Bernay
- Canton: Brionne

Government
  - Mayor (2020–2026): Marie-Christine Join-Lambert
- Area^{1}: 5.4 km^{2} (2.1 sq mi)
- Elevation: 131 m (430 ft)
- Highest elevation: 147 m (482 ft)
- Lowest elevation: 70 m (230 ft)
- Population (2023): 141
  - Density: 26/km^{2} (68/sq mi)
- Time zone: UTC+01:00 (CET)
  - Summer (DST): UTC+02:00 (CEST)
- INSEE/Postal code: 27113 /27800
- ^{1} French Land Register data, which excludes lakes, ponds, glaciers > 1 km^{2} (0.386 sq mi or 247 acres) and river estuaries.

Brétigny (French pronunciation: [bʁetiɲi]) is a commune in the Eure department and Normandy region of France.

== Population ==
Historical population
| Year | Pop. | ±% p.a. |
|---|---|---|
| 1968 | 130 | — |
| 1975 | 126 | −0.45% |
| 1982 | 128 | +0.23% |
| 1990 | 174 | +3.91% |
| 1999 | 159 | −1.00% |
| 2007 | 175 | +1.21% |
| 2012 | 172 | −0.35% |
| 2017 | 134 | −4.87% |
| 2023 | 141 | +0.85% |
Source: INSEE

== See also ==
- Communes of the Eure department
