= Aclou =

- Commune
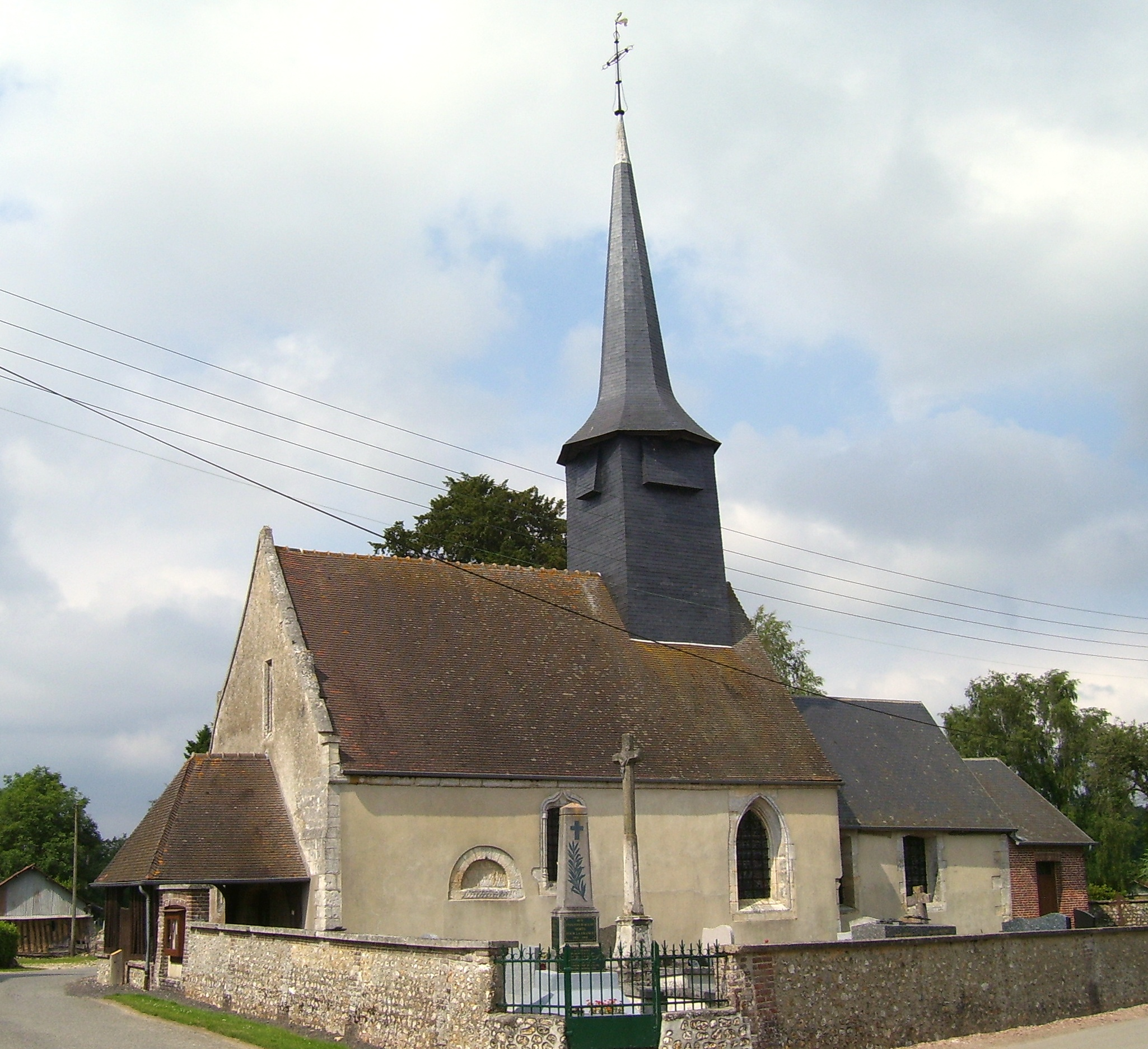
- Church Saint-Rémi
- Location of Aclou
- Location within France Location within Normandy
- Coordinates: 49°10′16″N 0°42′18″E
- Country: France
- Region: Normandy
- Department: Eure
- Arrondissement: Bernay
- Canton: Brionne
- Intercommunality: Intercom Bernay Terres de Normandie

Government
  - Mayor (2020–2026): Nicolas Seys
- Area^{1}: 3.7 km^{2} (1.4 sq mi)
- Elevation: 142 m (466 ft)
- Highest elevation: 155 m (509 ft)
- Lowest elevation: 57 m (187 ft)
- Population (2023): 337
  - Density: 91/km^{2} (240/sq mi)
- Time zone: UTC+01:00 (CET)
  - Summer (DST): UTC+02:00 (CEST)
- INSEE/Postal code: 27001 /27800
- ^{1} French Land Register data, which excludes lakes, ponds, glaciers > 1 km^{2} (0.386 sq mi or 247 acres) and river estuaries.

Aclou (French pronunciation: [aklu]) is a commune in the Eure department in Normandy in northern France.

== Geography ==
The commune along with another 69 communes shares part of a 4,747 hectare, Natura 2000 conservation area, called Risle, Guiel, Charentonne.

== Population ==
Historical population
Year	Pop.	±% p.a.
1968	189	—
1975	199	+0.74%
1982	250	+3.31%
1990	243	−0.35%
1999	222	−1.00%
2007	244	+1.19%
2012	281	+2.86%
2017	324	+2.89%
2023	337	+0.66%
Source: INSEE

== See also ==
- Communes of the Eure department
