= Combon =

- Commune
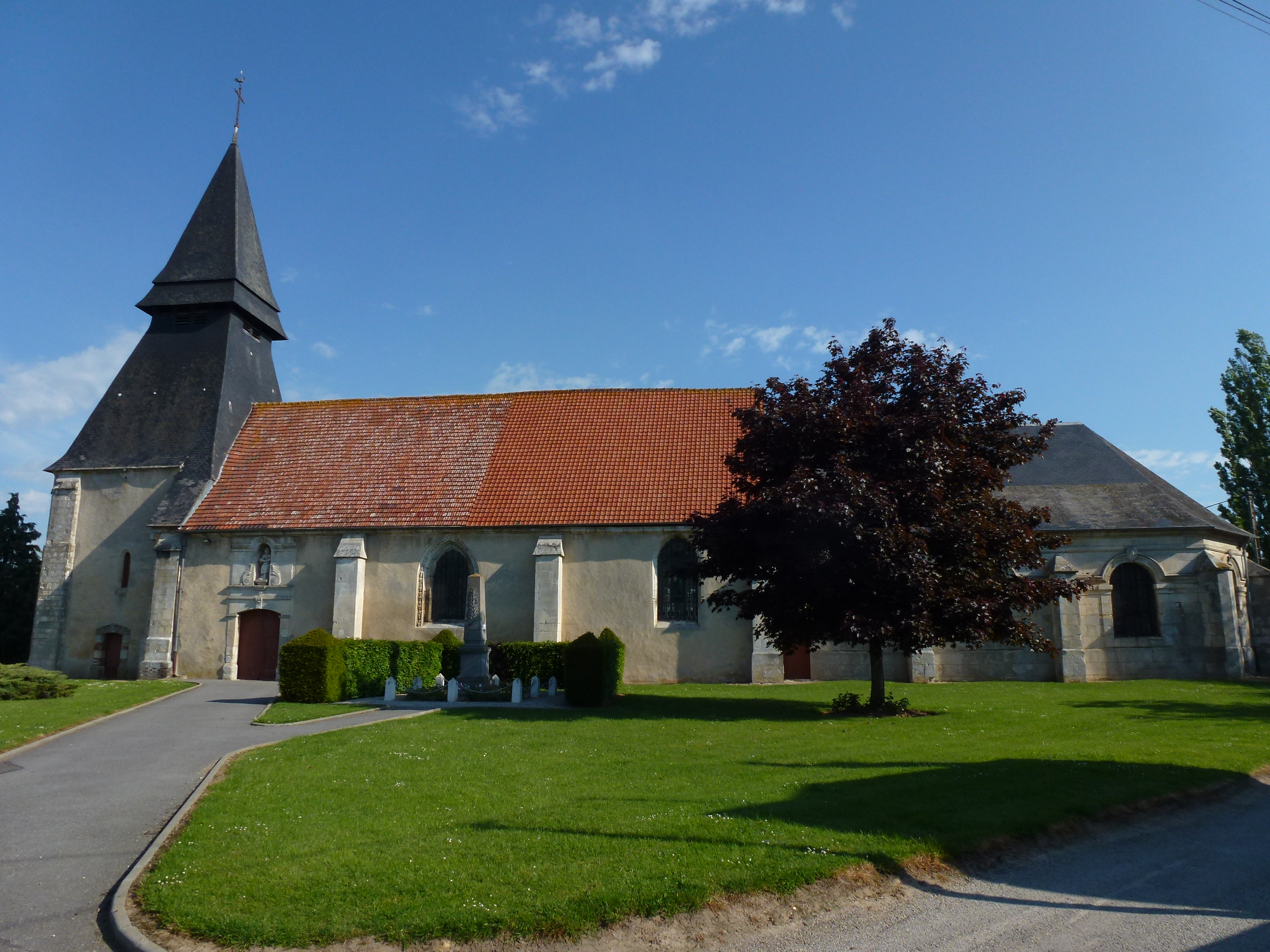
- The church in Combon
- Location of Combon
- Location within France Location within Normandy
- Coordinates: 49°05′52″N 0°53′24″E
- Country: France
- Region: Normandy
- Department: Eure
- Arrondissement: Bernay
- Canton: Brionne

Government
  - Mayor (2020–2026): Rémy Lecavelier Désétangs
- Area^{1}: 16.3 km^{2} (6.3 sq mi)
- Elevation: 149 m (489 ft)
- Highest elevation: 159 m (522 ft)
- Lowest elevation: 134 m (440 ft)
- Population (2023): 823
  - Density: 50.5/km^{2} (131/sq mi)
- Time zone: UTC+01:00 (CET)
  - Summer (DST): UTC+02:00 (CEST)
- INSEE/Postal code: 27164 /27170
- ^{1} French Land Register data, which excludes lakes, ponds, glaciers > 1 km^{2} (0.386 sq mi or 247 acres) and river estuaries.

Combon (French pronunciation: [kɔ̃bɔ̃]) is a commune in the Eure department in northern France.

== Population ==
Historical population
Year	Pop.	±% p.a.
1968	451	—
1975	462	+0.34%
1982	500	+1.14%
1990	554	+1.29%
1999	567	+0.26%
2007	718	+3.00%
2012	804	+2.29%
2017	813	+0.22%
2023	823	+0.20%
Source: INSEE

== See also ==
- Communes of the Eure department
