= Saint-Pierre-de-Salerne =

- Commune
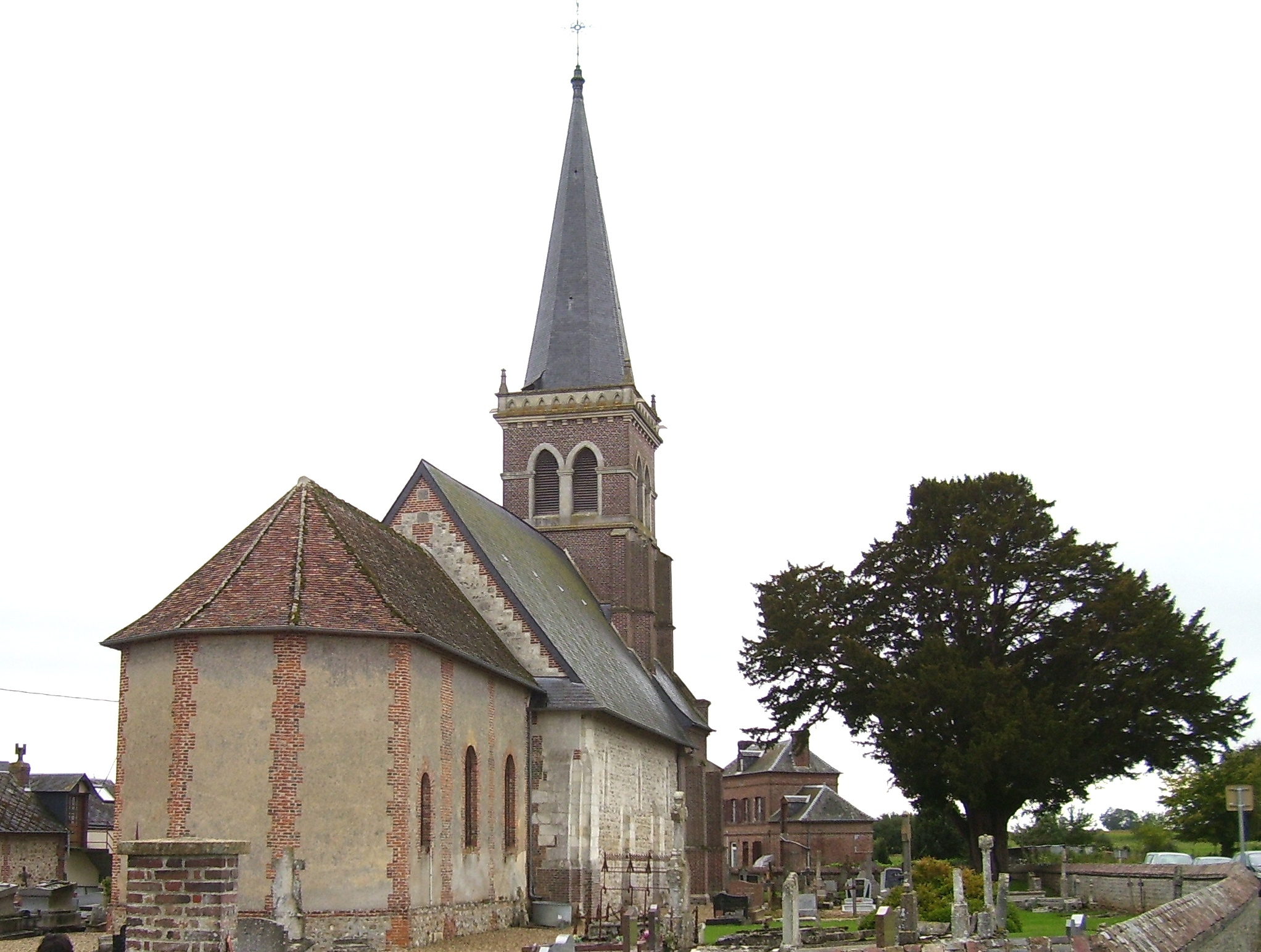
- Church
- Location of Saint-Pierre-de-Salerne
- Location within France Location within Normandy
- Coordinates: 49°12′09″N 0°39′53″E
- Country: France
- Region: Normandy
- Department: Eure
- Arrondissement: Bernay
- Canton: Brionne

Government
  - Mayor (2020–2026): Philippe Deleu
- Area^{1}: 6.92 km^{2} (2.67 sq mi)
- Elevation: 149 m (489 ft)
- Highest elevation: 162 m (531 ft)
- Lowest elevation: 50 m (160 ft)
- Population (2023): 225
  - Density: 32.5/km^{2} (84.2/sq mi)
- Time zone: UTC+01:00 (CET)
  - Summer (DST): UTC+02:00 (CEST)
- INSEE/Postal code: 27592 /27800
- ^{1} French Land Register data, which excludes lakes, ponds, glaciers > 1 km^{2} (0.386 sq mi or 247 acres) and river estuaries.

Saint-Pierre-de-Salerne (French pronunciation: [sɛ̃ pjɛʁ də salɛʁn]) is a commune in the Eure department in Normandy in northern France.

== Geography ==
The commune along with another 69 communes shares part of a 4,747 hectare, Natura 2000 conservation area, called Risle, Guiel, Charentonne.

== Population ==
Historical population
Year	Pop.	±% p.a.
1968	170	—
1975	162	−0.69%
1982	193	+2.53%
1990	210	+1.06%
1999	204	−0.32%
2007	245	+2.32%
2012	251	+0.49%
2017	248	−0.24%
2023	225	−1.61%
Source: INSEE

== See also ==
- Communes of the Eure department
