= Écardenville-la-Campagne =

- Commune
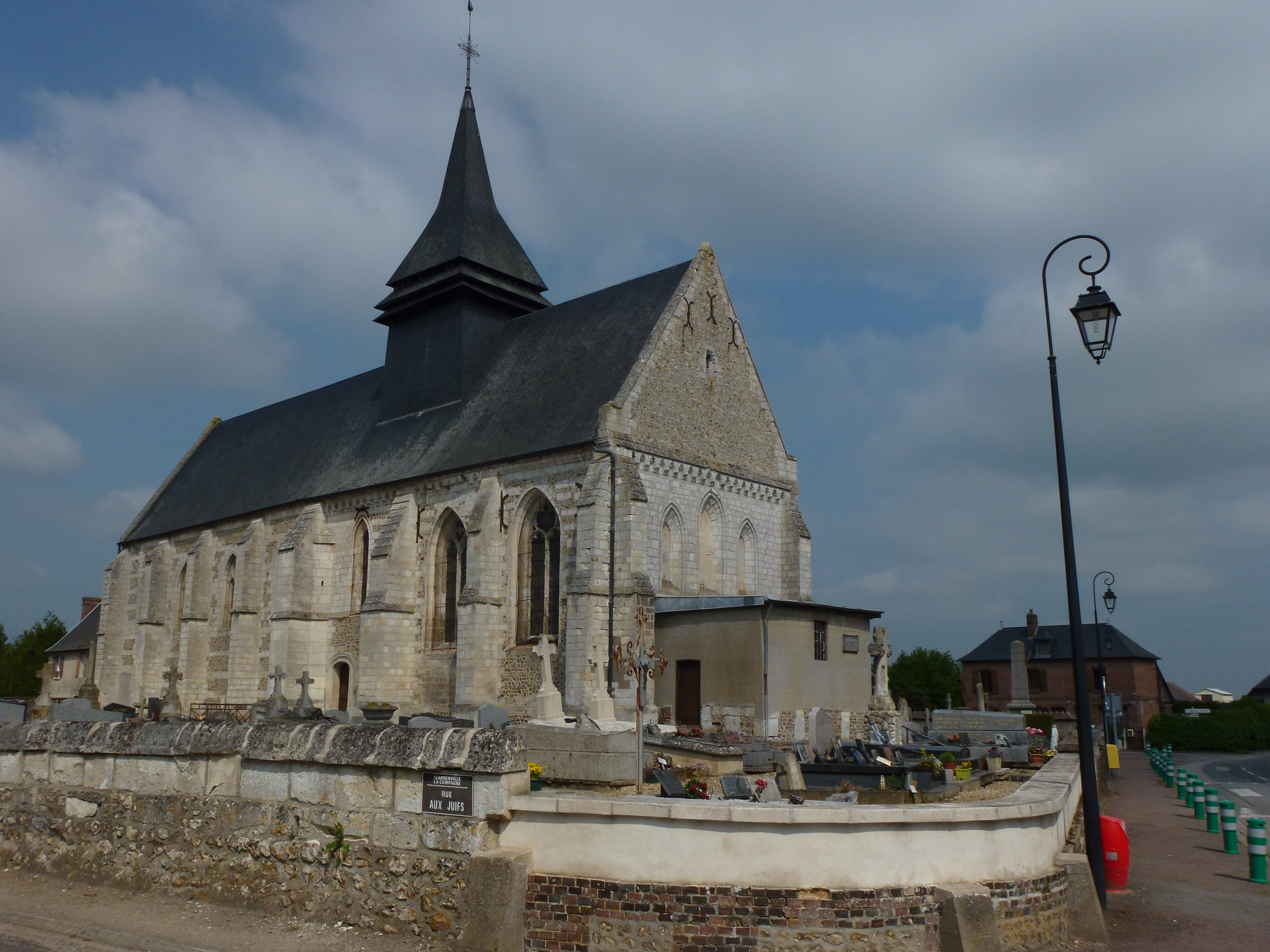
- The church in Écardenville-la-Campagne
- Location of Écardenville-la-Campagne
- Location within France Location within Normandy
- Coordinates: 49°07′10″N 0°50′51″E
- Country: France
- Region: Normandy
- Department: Eure
- Arrondissement: Bernay
- Canton: Brionne

Government
  - Mayor (2020–2026): Didier Lecoq
- Area^{1}: 7.4 km^{2} (2.9 sq mi)
- Elevation: 158 m (518 ft)
- Highest elevation: 159 m (522 ft)
- Lowest elevation: 139 m (456 ft)
- Population (2023): 441
  - Density: 60/km^{2} (150/sq mi)
- Time zone: UTC+01:00 (CET)
  - Summer (DST): UTC+02:00 (CEST)
- INSEE/Postal code: 27210 /27170
- ^{1} French Land Register data, which excludes lakes, ponds, glaciers > 1 km^{2} (0.386 sq mi or 247 acres) and river estuaries.

Écardenville-la-Campagne (French pronunciation: [ekaʁdɑ̃vil la kɑ̃paɲ]) is a commune in the Eure department in northern France.

== Population ==
Historical population
Year	Pop.	±% p.a.
1968	343	—
1975	307	−1.57%
1982	321	+0.64%
1990	327	+0.23%
1999	310	−0.59%
2007	381	+2.61%
2012	458	+3.75%
2017	473	+0.65%
2023	441	−1.16%
Source: INSEE

== See also ==
- Communes of the Eure department
