= Le Plessis-Sainte-Opportune =

- Commune
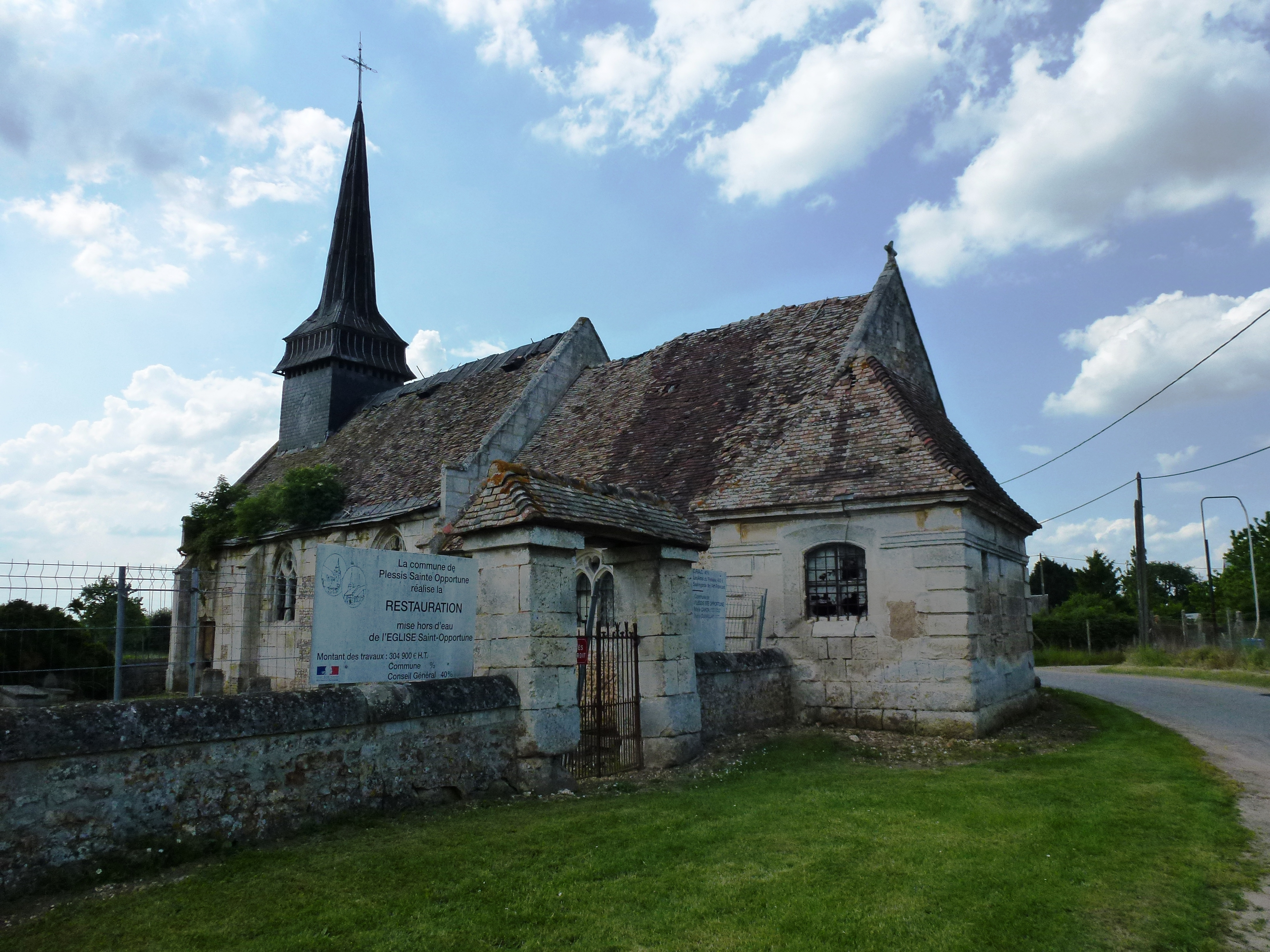
- The church in Le Plessis-Sainte-Opportune
- Location of Le Plessis-Sainte-Opportune
- Location within France Location within Normandy
- Coordinates: 49°04′23″N 0°51′45″E
- Country: France
- Region: Normandy
- Department: Eure
- Arrondissement: Bernay
- Canton: Brionne

Government
  - Mayor (2020–2026): Lucette Leclercq
- Area^{1}: 11.37 km^{2} (4.39 sq mi)
- Elevation: 146 m (479 ft)
- Highest elevation: 159 m (522 ft)
- Lowest elevation: 140 m (460 ft)
- Population (2023): 351
  - Density: 30.9/km^{2} (80.0/sq mi)
- Time zone: UTC+01:00 (CET)
  - Summer (DST): UTC+02:00 (CEST)
- INSEE/Postal code: 27466 /27170
- ^{1} French Land Register data, which excludes lakes, ponds, glaciers > 1 km^{2} (0.386 sq mi or 247 acres) and river estuaries.

Le Plessis-Sainte-Opportune (French pronunciation: [lə plɛsi sɛ̃t ɔpɔʁtyn]) is a commune in the Eure department in Normandy in northern France.

== Population ==
Historical population
Year	Pop.	±% p.a.
1968	244	—
1975	190	−3.51%
1982	220	+2.12%
1990	246	+1.41%
1999	252	+0.27%
2007	259	+0.34%
2012	285	+1.93%
2017	335	+3.29%
2023	351	+0.78%
Source: INSEE

== See also ==
- Communes of the Eure department
