= Notre-Dame-d'Épine =

- Commune
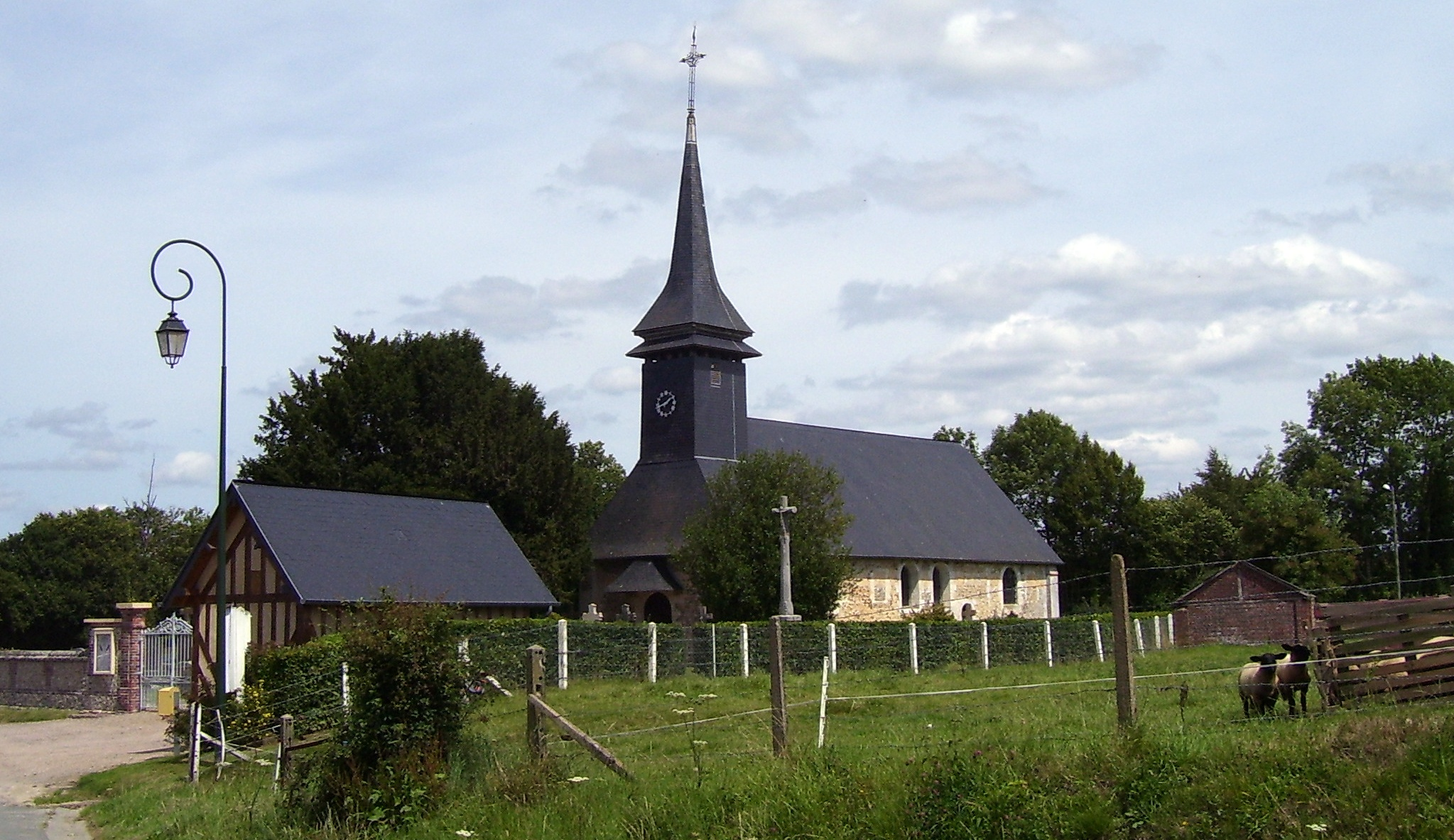
- The church in Notre-Dame-d'Épine
- Location of Notre-Dame-d'Épine
- Location within France Location within Normandy
- Coordinates: 49°11′53″N 0°36′06″E
- Country: France
- Region: Normandy
- Department: Eure
- Arrondissement: Bernay
- Canton: Brionne

Government
  - Mayor (2020–2026): Sébastien Cavelier
- Area^{1}: 1.7 km^{2} (0.66 sq mi)
- Elevation: 161 m (528 ft)
- Highest elevation: 170 m (560 ft)
- Lowest elevation: 152 m (499 ft)
- Population (2023): 67
  - Density: 39/km^{2} (100/sq mi)
- Time zone: UTC+01:00 (CET)
  - Summer (DST): UTC+02:00 (CEST)
- INSEE/Postal code: 27441 /27800
- ^{1} French Land Register data, which excludes lakes, ponds, glaciers > 1 km^{2} (0.386 sq mi or 247 acres) and river estuaries.

Notre-Dame-d'Épine (French pronunciation: [nɔtʁ dam depin]) is a commune in the Eure department and Normandy region of France.

== Population ==
Historical population
Year	Pop.	±% p.a.
1968	59	—
1975	64	+1.17%
1982	77	+2.68%
1990	84	+1.09%
1999	83	−0.13%
2007	77	−0.93%
2012	73	−1.06%
2017	81	+2.10%
2023	67	−3.11%
Source: INSEE

== See also ==
- Communes of the Eure department
