= La Neuville-du-Bosc =

- Commune
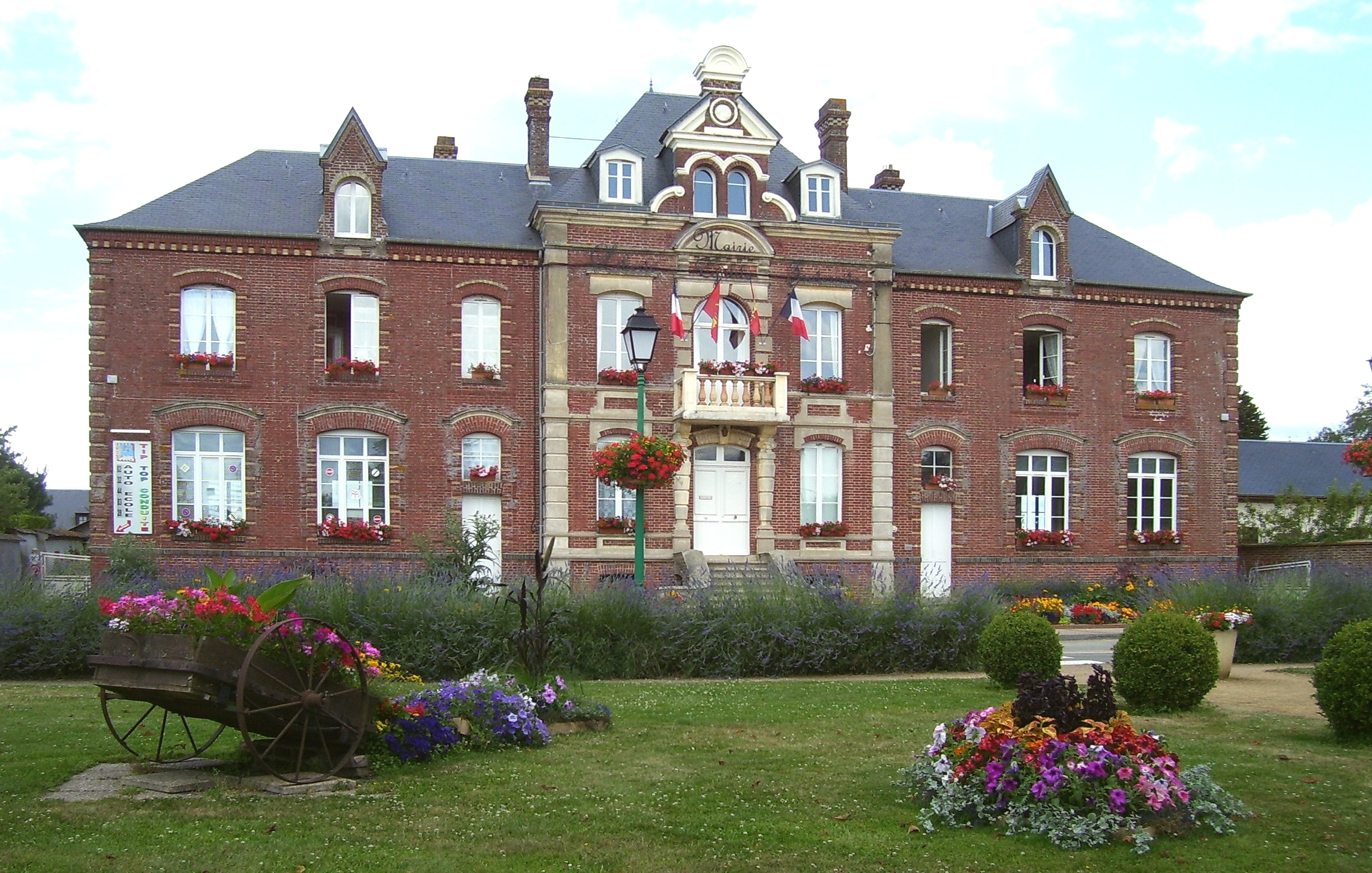
- Town hall

- Coat of arms
- Location of La Neuville-du-Bosc
- Location within France Location within Normandy
- Coordinates: 49°11′38″N 0°48′49″E
- Country: France
- Region: Normandy
- Department: Eure
- Arrondissement: Bernay
- Canton: Brionne
- Intercommunality: Bernay Terres de Normandie

Government
  - Mayor (2020–2026): Bernard Forcher
- Area^{1}: 14.45 km^{2} (5.58 sq mi)
- Elevation: 151 m (495 ft)
- Highest elevation: 152 m (499 ft)
- Lowest elevation: 69 m (226 ft)
- Population (2023): 706
  - Density: 48.9/km^{2} (127/sq mi)
- Time zone: UTC+01:00 (CET)
  - Summer (DST): UTC+02:00 (CEST)
- INSEE/Postal code: 27432 /27890
- ^{1} French Land Register data, which excludes lakes, ponds, glaciers > 1 km^{2} (0.386 sq mi or 247 acres) and river estuaries.

La Neuville-du-Bosc is a commune in the Eure department in Normandy in northern France.

== Population ==
Historical population
Year	Pop.	±% p.a.
1968	336	—
1975	339	+0.13%
1982	339	+0.00%
1990	325	−0.53%
1999	372	+1.51%
2007	528	+4.47%
2012	578	+1.83%
2017	652	+2.44%
2023	706	+1.34%
Source: INSEE

== See also ==
- Communes of the Eure department
