= Rouge-Perriers =

- Commune
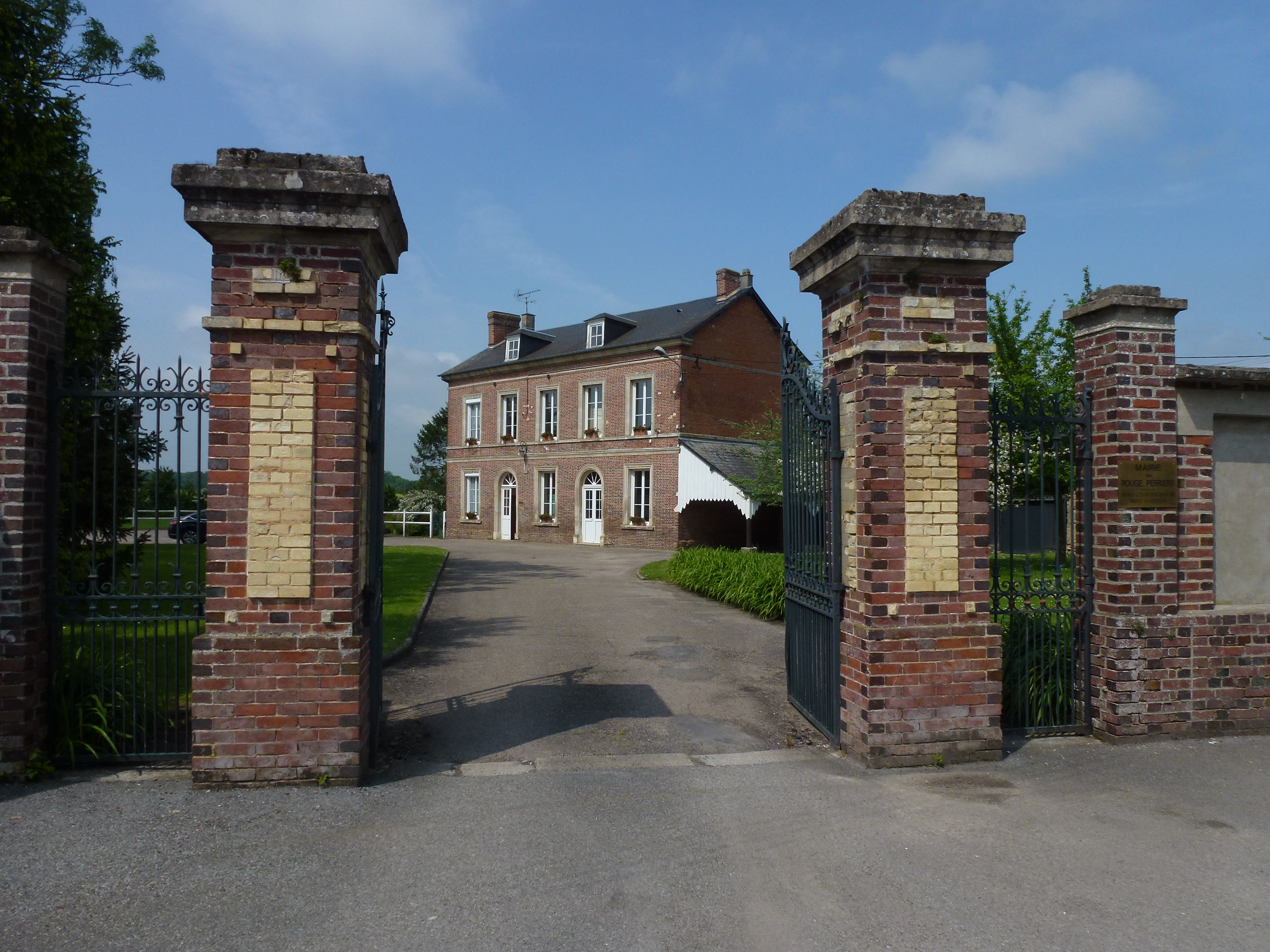
- Town hall
- Location of Rouge-Perriers
- Location within France Location within Normandy
- Coordinates: 49°08′51″N 0°50′05″E
- Country: France
- Region: Normandy
- Department: Eure
- Arrondissement: Bernay
- Canton: Brionne

Government
  - Mayor (2020–2026): Jean-Claude Rousselin
- Area^{1}: 4.12 km^{2} (1.59 sq mi)
- Elevation: 142 m (466 ft)
- Highest elevation: 149 m (489 ft)
- Lowest elevation: 125 m (410 ft)
- Population (2023): 374
  - Density: 90.8/km^{2} (235/sq mi)
- Time zone: UTC+01:00 (CET)
  - Summer (DST): UTC+02:00 (CEST)
- INSEE/Postal code: 27498 /27110
- ^{1} French Land Register data, which excludes lakes, ponds, glaciers > 1 km^{2} (0.386 sq mi or 247 acres) and river estuaries.

Rouge-Perriers (French pronunciation: [ʁuʒ pɛʁje]) is a commune in the Eure department in the northern French region of Normandy.

== Population ==
Historical population
| Year | Pop. | ±% p.a. |
|---|---|---|
| 1968 | 189 | — |
| 1975 | 198 | +0.67% |
| 1982 | 200 | +0.14% |
| 1990 | 210 | +0.61% |
| 1999 | 230 | +1.02% |
| 2007 | 262 | +1.64% |
| 2012 | 318 | +3.95% |
| 2017 | 367 | +2.91% |
| 2023 | 374 | +0.32% |
Source: INSEE

== See also ==
- Communes of the Eure department
