= Canton of Brionne =

Canton in Normandy, France

Coordinates: 49.20°N 0.72°E

The canton of Brionne is an administrative division of the Eure department, northern France. Its borders were modified at the French canton reorganisation which came into effect in March 2015. Its seat is in Brionne.

It consists of the following communes:

1. Aclou
2. Barc
3. Barquet
4. Beaumontel
5. Beaumont-le-Roger
6. Le Bec-Hellouin
7. Berthouville
8. Berville-la-Campagne
9. Boisney
10. Bosrobert
11. Bray
12. Brétigny
13. Brionne
14. Calleville
15. Combon
16. Écardenville-la-Campagne
17. Franqueville
18. Goupil-Othon
19. Grosley-sur-Risle
20. Harcourt
21. La Haye-de-Calleville
22. Hecmanville
23. La Houssaye
24. Launay
25. Livet-sur-Authou
26. Malleville-sur-le-Bec
27. Morsan
28. Nassandres sur Risle
29. La Neuville-du-Bosc
30. Neuville-sur-Authou
31. Notre-Dame-d'Épine
32. Le Plessis-Sainte-Opportune
33. Romilly-la-Puthenaye
34. Rouge-Perriers
35. Saint-Cyr-de-Salerne
36. Saint-Éloi-de-Fourques
37. Sainte-Opportune-du-Bosc
38. Saint-Paul-de-Fourques
39. Saint-Pierre-de-Salerne
40. Saint-Victor-d'Épine
41. Thibouville
