= Boisney =

- Commune
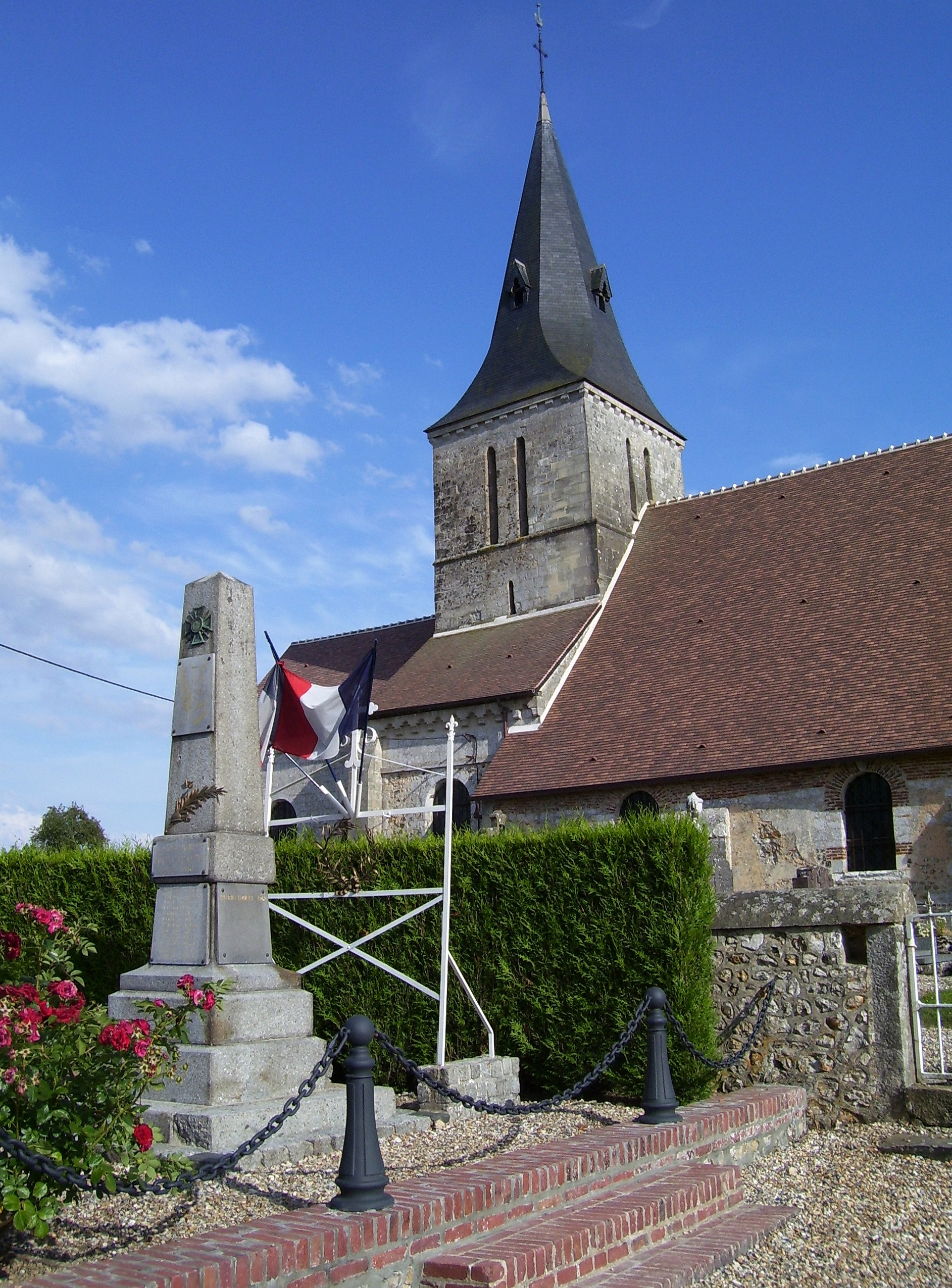
- The church and war memorial in Boisney
- Location of Boisney
- Location within France Location within Normandy
- Coordinates: 49°09′19″N 0°39′22″E
- Country: France
- Region: Normandy
- Department: Eure
- Arrondissement: Bernay
- Canton: Brionne

Government
  - Mayor (2020–2026): Edmond Deshayes
- Area^{1}: 5.76 km^{2} (2.22 sq mi)
- Elevation: 159 m (522 ft)
- Highest elevation: 170 m (560 ft)
- Lowest elevation: 149 m (489 ft)
- Population (2023): 293
  - Density: 50.9/km^{2} (132/sq mi)
- Time zone: UTC+01:00 (CET)
  - Summer (DST): UTC+02:00 (CEST)
- INSEE/Postal code: 27074 /27800
- ^{1} French Land Register data, which excludes lakes, ponds, glaciers > 1 km^{2} (0.386 sq mi or 247 acres) and river estuaries.

Boisney (French pronunciation: [bwanɛ]) is a commune in the Eure department in Normandy in northern France.

== Population ==
Historical population
Year	Pop.	±% p.a.
1968	241	—
1975	249	+0.47%
1982	242	−0.41%
1990	276	+1.66%
1999	301	+0.97%
2007	280	−0.90%
2012	289	+0.63%
2017	283	−0.42%
2023	293	+0.58%
Source: INSEE

== See also ==
- Communes of the Eure department
