= Thibouville =

- Commune
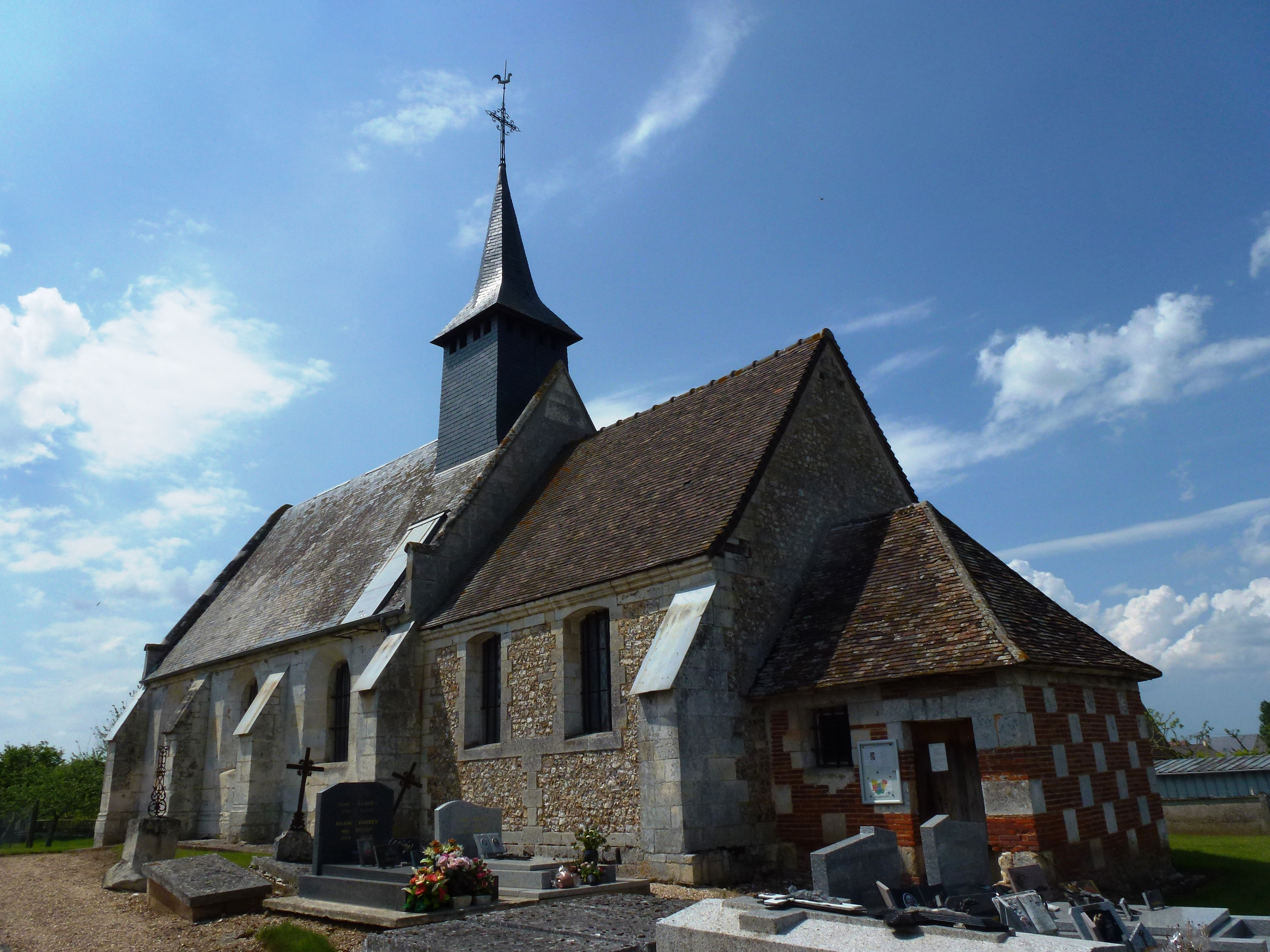
- The church in La Cambe, in Thibouville
- Location of Thibouville
- Location within France Location within Normandy
- Coordinates: 49°08′54″N 0°47′36″E
- Country: France
- Region: Normandy
- Department: Eure
- Arrondissement: Bernay
- Canton: Brionne

Government
  - Mayor (2020–2026): Philippe Coutel
- Area^{1}: 8.83 km^{2} (3.41 sq mi)
- Elevation: 139 m (456 ft)
- Highest elevation: 161 m (528 ft)
- Lowest elevation: 118 m (387 ft)
- Population (2023): 328
  - Density: 37.1/km^{2} (96.2/sq mi)
- Time zone: UTC+01:00 (CET)
  - Summer (DST): UTC+02:00 (CEST)
- INSEE/Postal code: 27630 /27800
- ^{1} French Land Register data, which excludes lakes, ponds, glaciers > 1 km^{2} (0.386 sq mi or 247 acres) and river estuaries.

Thibouville (French pronunciation: [tibuvil]) is a commune in the Eure department in Normandy in northern France.

== Population ==
Historical population
Year	Pop.	±% p.a.
1968	354	—
1975	290	−2.81%
1982	246	−2.32%
1990	232	−0.73%
1999	244	+0.56%
2007	258	+0.70%
2012	287	+2.15%
2017	312	+1.68%
2023	328	+0.84%
Source: INSEE

== See also ==
- Communes of the Eure department
