= Bray, Eure =

Bray
- Commune
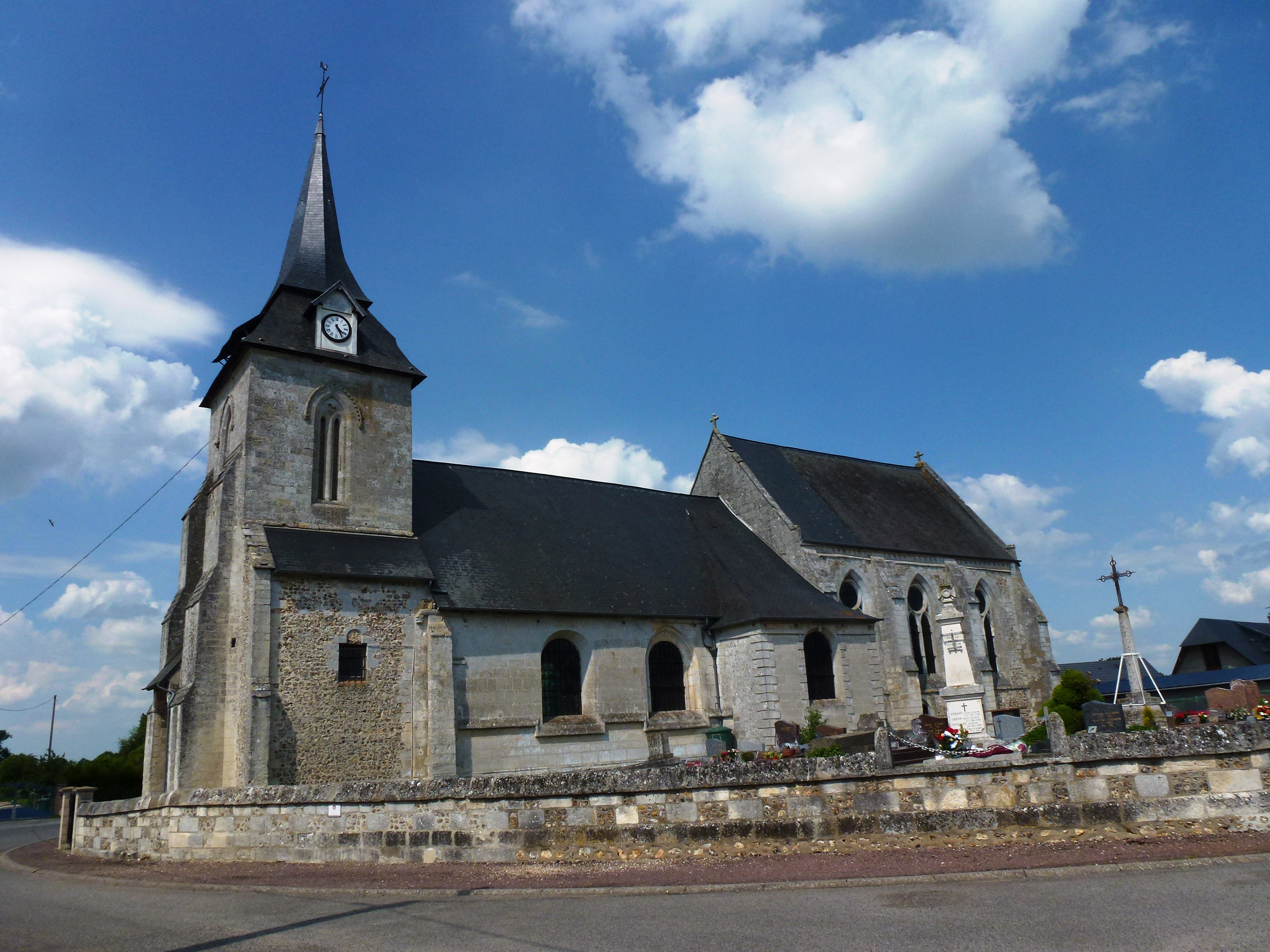
- The church in Bray
- Location of Bray
- Location within France Location within Normandy
- Coordinates: 49°06′28″N 0°50′36″E
- Country: France
- Region: Normandy
- Department: Eure
- Arrondissement: Bernay
- Canton: Brionne

Government
  - Mayor (2020–2026): Danielle Camus
- Area^{1}: 5.85 km^{2} (2.26 sq mi)
- Elevation: 145 m (476 ft)
- Highest elevation: 161 m (528 ft)
- Lowest elevation: 143 m (469 ft)
- Population (2023): 398
  - Density: 68.0/km^{2} (176/sq mi)
- Time zone: UTC+01:00 (CET)
  - Summer (DST): UTC+02:00 (CEST)
- INSEE/Postal code: 27109 /27170
- ^{1} French Land Register data, which excludes lakes, ponds, glaciers > 1 km^{2} (0.386 sq mi or 247 acres) and river estuaries.

Bray (French pronunciation: [bʁɛ]) is a commune in the Eure department in Normandy in northern France.

== Population ==
Historical population
Year	Pop.	±% p.a.
1968	208	—
1975	191	−1.21%
1982	189	−0.15%
1990	244	+3.24%
1999	246	+0.09%
2007	265	+0.93%
2012	368	+6.79%
2017	398	+1.58%
2023	398	+0.00%
Source: INSEE

== See also ==
- Communes of the Eure department
