= Saint-Paul-de-Fourques =

- Commune
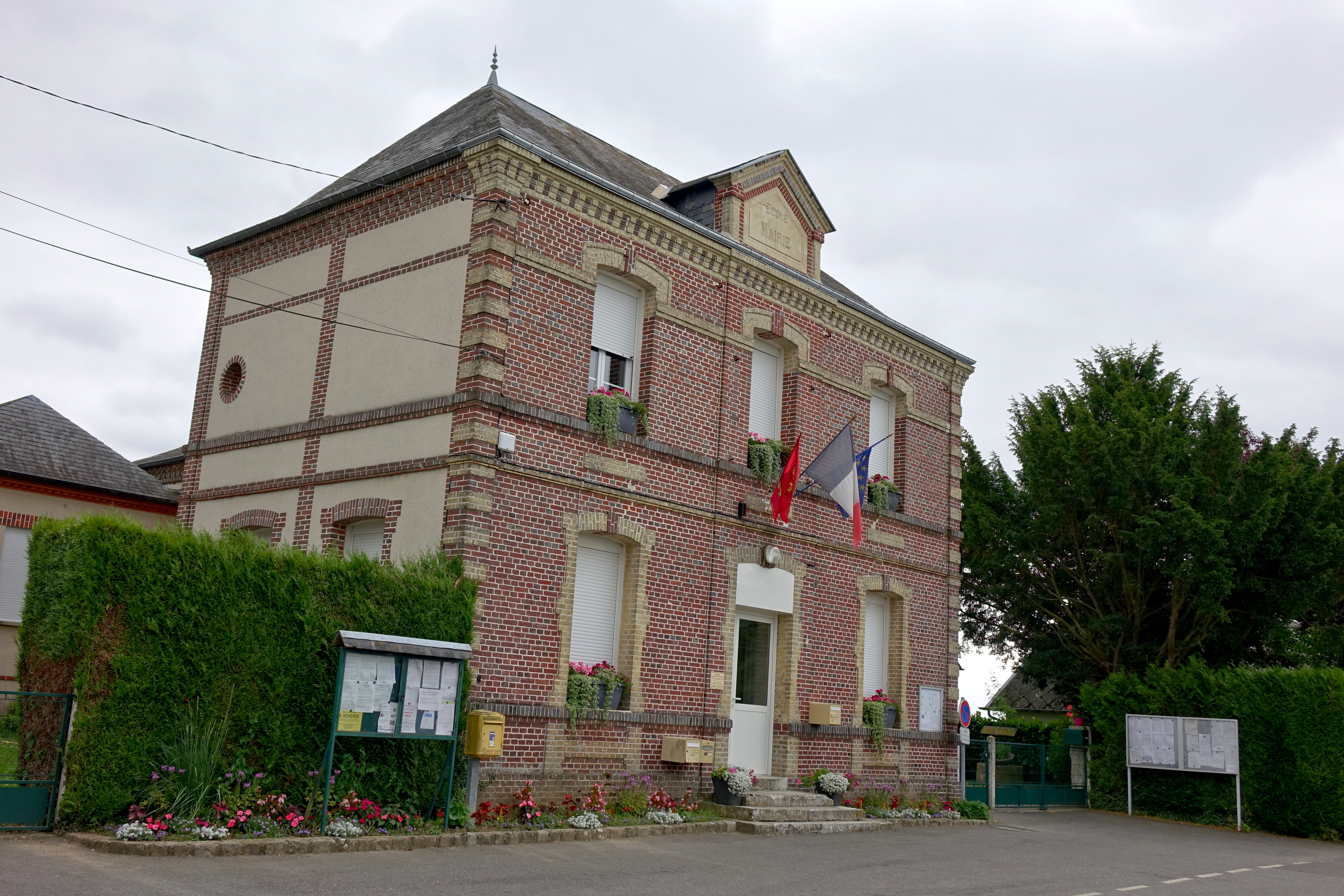
- The town hall in Saint-Paul-de-Fourques
- Location of Saint-Paul-de-Fourques
- Location within France Location within Normandy
- Coordinates: 49°13′19″N 0°47′47″E
- Country: France
- Region: Normandy
- Department: Eure
- Arrondissement: Bernay
- Canton: Brionne

Government
  - Mayor (2020–2026): Yves Ruel
- Area^{1}: 4.03 km^{2} (1.56 sq mi)
- Elevation: 157 m (515 ft)
- Highest elevation: 155 m (509 ft)
- Lowest elevation: 72 m (236 ft)
- Population (2023): 277
  - Density: 68.7/km^{2} (178/sq mi)
- Time zone: UTC+01:00 (CET)
  - Summer (DST): UTC+02:00 (CEST)
- INSEE/Postal code: 27584 /27800
- ^{1} French Land Register data, which excludes lakes, ponds, glaciers > 1 km^{2} (0.386 sq mi or 247 acres) and river estuaries.

Saint-Paul-de-Fourques (French pronunciation: [sɛ̃ pɔl də fuʁk]) is a commune in the Eure department in Normandy in northern France.

== Population ==
Historical population
Year	Pop.	±% p.a.
1968	124	—
1975	108	−1.95%
1982	114	+0.78%
1990	156	+4.00%
1999	172	+1.09%
2007	228	+3.59%
2012	290	+4.93%
2017	294	+0.27%
2023	277	−0.99%
Source: INSEE

== See also ==
- Communes of the Eure department
