= Malleville-sur-le-Bec =

- Commune
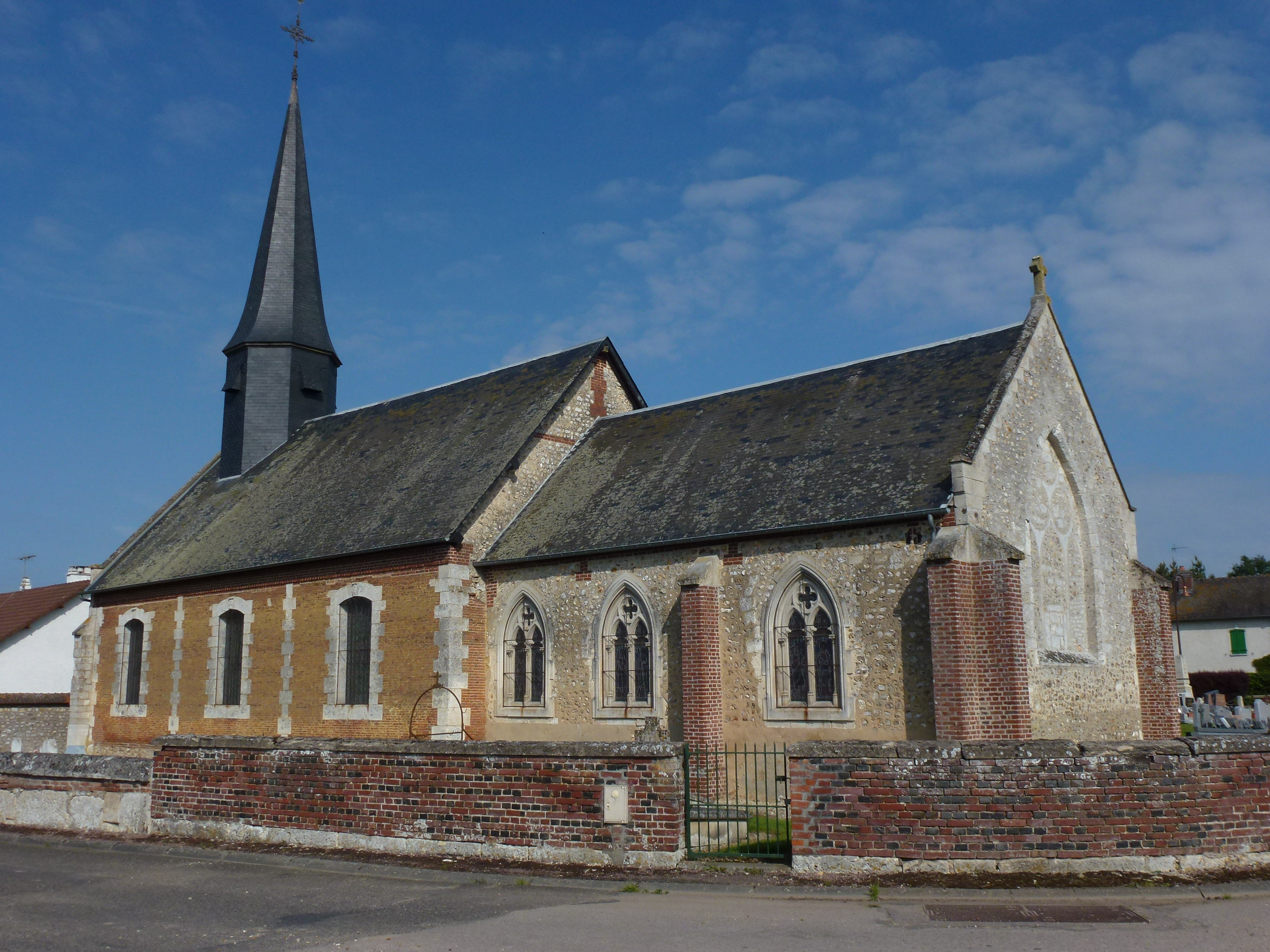
- The church in Malleville-sur-le-Bec
- Location of Malleville-sur-le-Bec
- Location within France Location within Normandy
- Coordinates: 49°14′13″N 0°44′49″E
- Country: France
- Region: Normandy
- Department: Eure
- Arrondissement: Bernay
- Canton: Brionne

Government
  - Mayor (2020–2026): Michel Auger
- Area^{1}: 6.98 km^{2} (2.69 sq mi)
- Elevation: 145 m (476 ft)
- Highest elevation: 152 m (499 ft)
- Lowest elevation: 90 m (300 ft)
- Population (2023): 264
  - Density: 37.8/km^{2} (98.0/sq mi)
- Time zone: UTC+01:00 (CET)
  - Summer (DST): UTC+02:00 (CEST)
- INSEE/Postal code: 27380 /27800
- ^{1} French Land Register data, which excludes lakes, ponds, glaciers > 1 km^{2} (0.386 sq mi or 247 acres) and river estuaries.

Malleville-sur-le-Bec (French pronunciation: [malvil syʁ lə bɛk], literally Malleville on Le Bec) is a commune in the Eure department in Normandy in northern France.

== Population ==
Historical population
Year	Pop.	±% p.a.
1968	167	—
1975	157	−0.88%
1982	156	−0.09%
1990	163	+0.55%
1999	164	+0.07%
2007	186	+1.59%
2012	247	+5.84%
2017	261	+1.11%
2023	264	+0.19%
Source: INSEE

== See also ==
- Communes of the Eure department
