= Barc, Eure =

Barc
- Commune
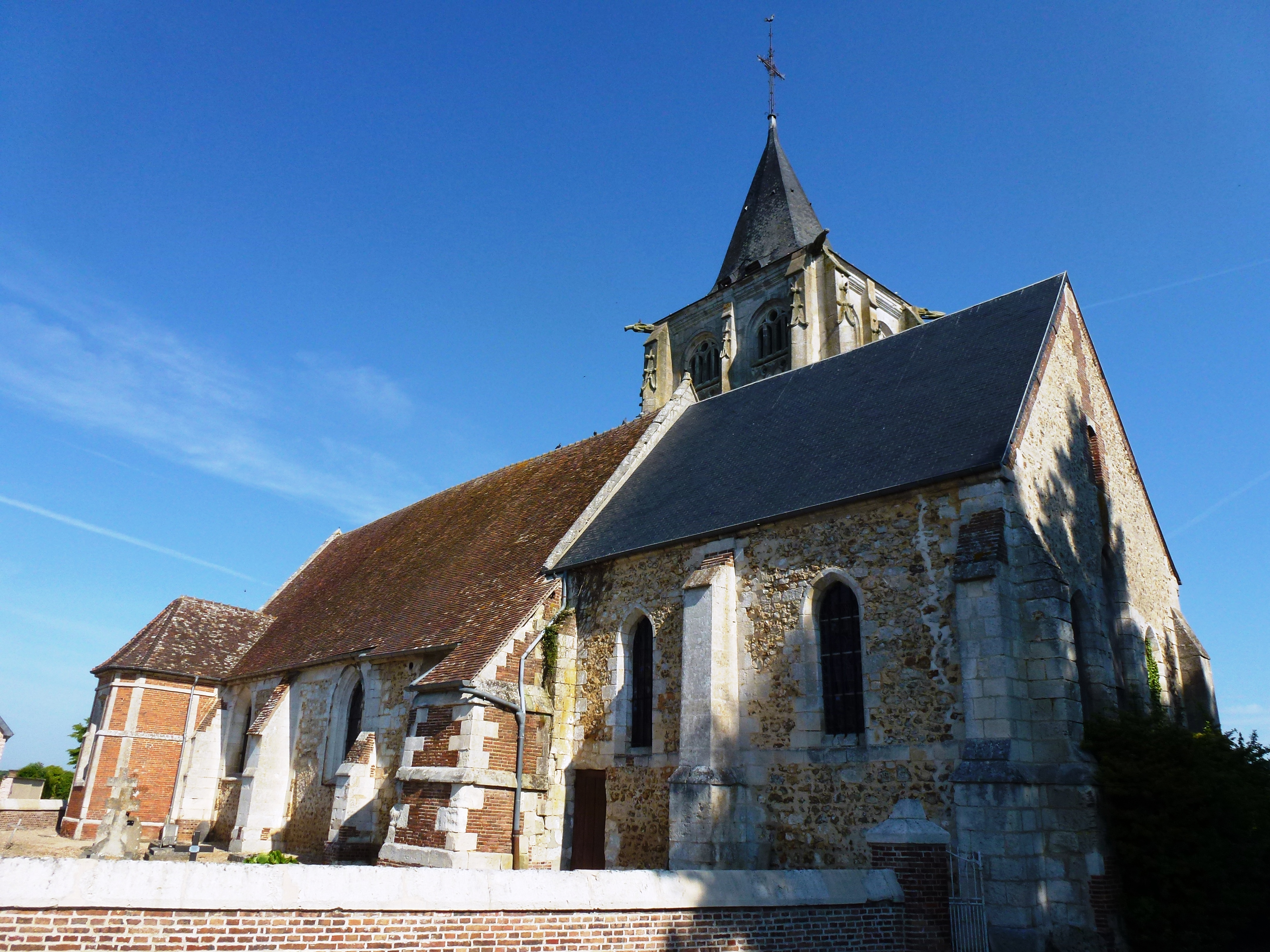
- The church in Barc

- Coat of arms
- Location of Barc
- Location within France Location within Normandy
- Coordinates: 49°04′14″N 0°49′20″E
- Country: France
- Region: Normandy
- Department: Eure
- Arrondissement: Bernay
- Canton: Brionne
- Intercommunality: Intercom Bernay Terres de Normandie

Government
  - Mayor (2020–2026): Jocelyne Heurtaux
- Area^{1}: 11.35 km^{2} (4.38 sq mi)
- Elevation: 130 m (430 ft)
- Highest elevation: 158 m (518 ft)
- Lowest elevation: 105 m (344 ft)
- Population (2023): 1,166
  - Density: 102.7/km^{2} (266.1/sq mi)
- Time zone: UTC+01:00 (CET)
  - Summer (DST): UTC+02:00 (CEST)
- INSEE/Postal code: 27037 /27170
- ^{1} French Land Register data, which excludes lakes, ponds, glaciers > 1 km^{2} (0.386 sq mi or 247 acres) and river estuaries.

Barc (French pronunciation: [baʁk]) is a commune in the Eure department in Normandy in northern France.

== Population ==
Historical population
Year	Pop.	±% p.a.
1968	594	—
1975	579	−0.36%
1982	639	+1.42%
1990	766	+2.29%
1999	772	+0.09%
2007	898	+1.91%
2012	1,111	+4.35%
2017	1,225	+1.97%
2023	1,166	−0.82%
Source: INSEE

== See also ==
- Communes of the Eure department
