= Hecmanville =

- Commune
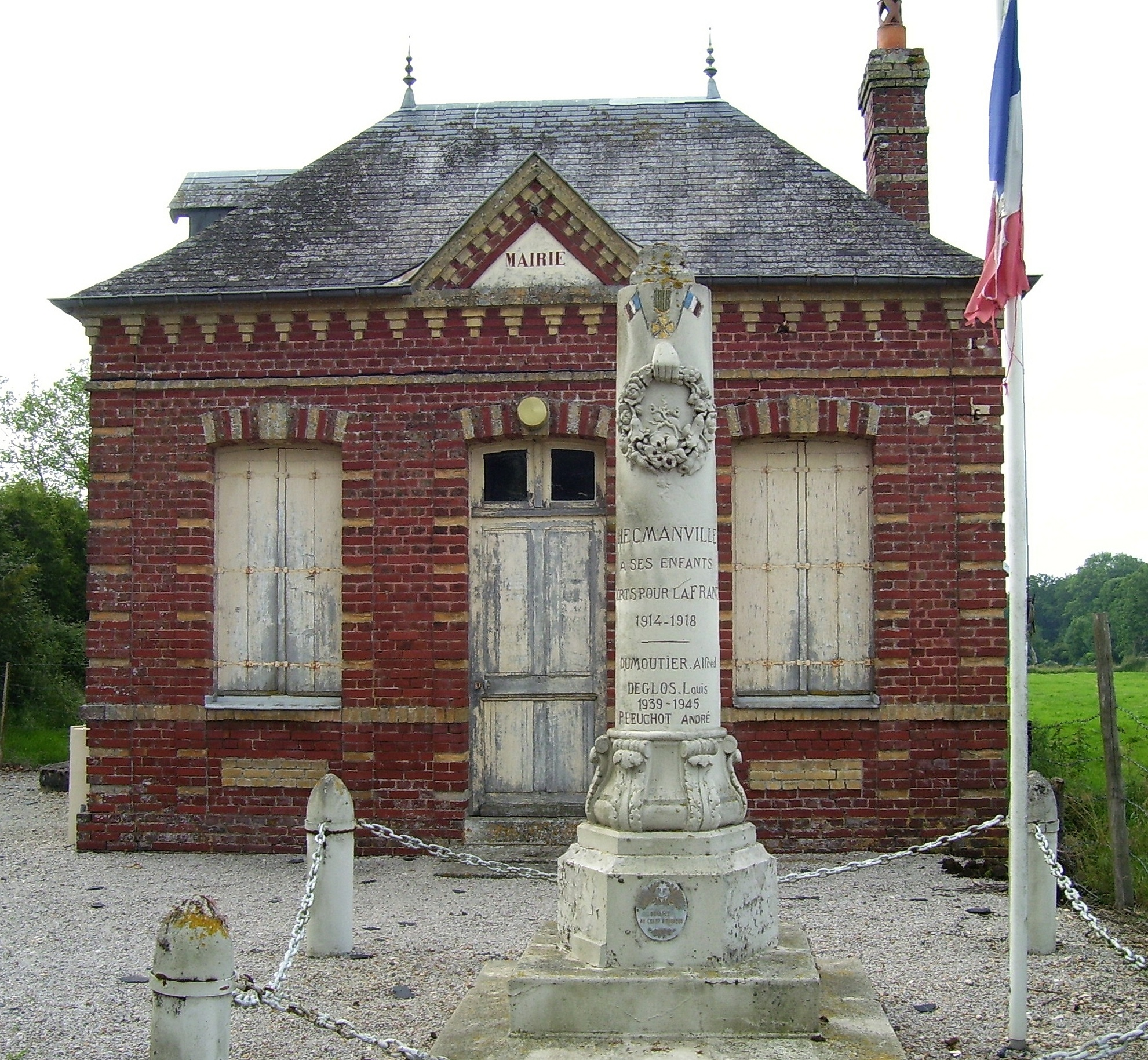
- Old town hall and war memorial
- Location of Hecmanville
- Location within France Location within Normandy
- Coordinates: 49°10′29″N 0°39′39″E
- Country: France
- Region: Normandy
- Department: Eure
- Arrondissement: Bernay
- Canton: Brionne

Government
  - Mayor (2020–2026): Jean Duthilleul
- Area^{1}: 2.99 km^{2} (1.15 sq mi)
- Elevation: 165 m (541 ft)
- Highest elevation: 161 m (528 ft)
- Lowest elevation: 135 m (443 ft)
- Population (2023): 199
  - Density: 66.6/km^{2} (172/sq mi)
- Time zone: UTC+01:00 (CET)
  - Summer (DST): UTC+02:00 (CEST)
- INSEE/Postal code: 27325 /27800
- ^{1} French Land Register data, which excludes lakes, ponds, glaciers > 1 km^{2} (0.386 sq mi or 247 acres) and river estuaries.

Hecmanville (French pronunciation: [ɛkmɑ̃vil]) is a commune in the Eure department in northern France.

== Population ==
Historical population
| Year | Pop. | ±% p.a. |
|---|---|---|
| 1968 | 61 | — |
| 1975 | 58 | −0.72% |
| 1982 | 86 | +5.79% |
| 1990 | 70 | −2.54% |
| 1999 | 104 | +4.50% |
| 2007 | 107 | +0.36% |
| 2012 | 162 | +8.65% |
| 2017 | 173 | +1.32% |
| 2023 | 199 | +2.36% |
Source: INSEE

== See also ==
- Communes of the Eure department
