= Saint-Cyr-de-Salerne =

- Commune
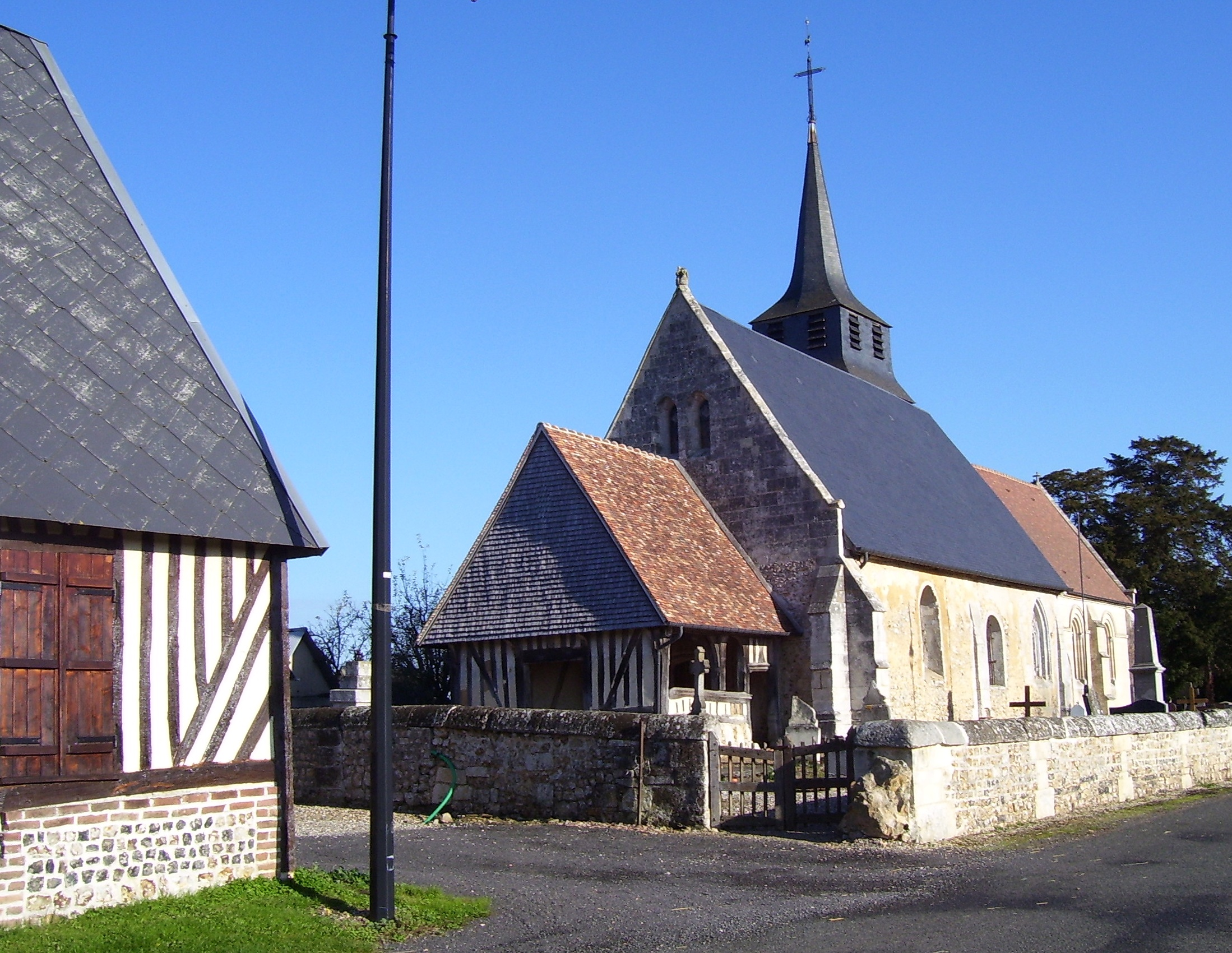
- Saint-Cyr-et-Sainte-Julitte
- Location of Saint-Cyr-de-Salerne
- Location within France Location within Normandy
- Coordinates: 49°11′02″N 0°39′31″E
- Country: France
- Region: Normandy
- Department: Eure
- Arrondissement: Bernay
- Canton: Brionne

Government
  - Mayor (2020–2026): Christian Deslande
- Area^{1}: 6.38 km^{2} (2.46 sq mi)
- Elevation: 148 m (486 ft)
- Highest elevation: 163 m (535 ft)
- Lowest elevation: 83 m (272 ft)
- Population (2023): 205
  - Density: 32.1/km^{2} (83.2/sq mi)
- Time zone: UTC+01:00 (CET)
  - Summer (DST): UTC+02:00 (CEST)
- INSEE/Postal code: 27527 /27800
- ^{1} French Land Register data, which excludes lakes, ponds, glaciers > 1 km^{2} (0.386 sq mi or 247 acres) and river estuaries.

Saint-Cyr-de-Salerne is a commune in the Eure department in Normandy in northern France.

== Population ==
Historical population
Year	Pop.	±% p.a.
1968	197	—
1975	185	−0.89%
1982	207	+1.62%
1990	209	+0.12%
1999	211	+0.11%
2007	219	+0.47%
2012	208	−1.03%
2017	205	−0.29%
2023	205	+0.00%
Source: INSEE

== See also ==
- Communes of the Eure department
