= La Houssaye =

- Commune
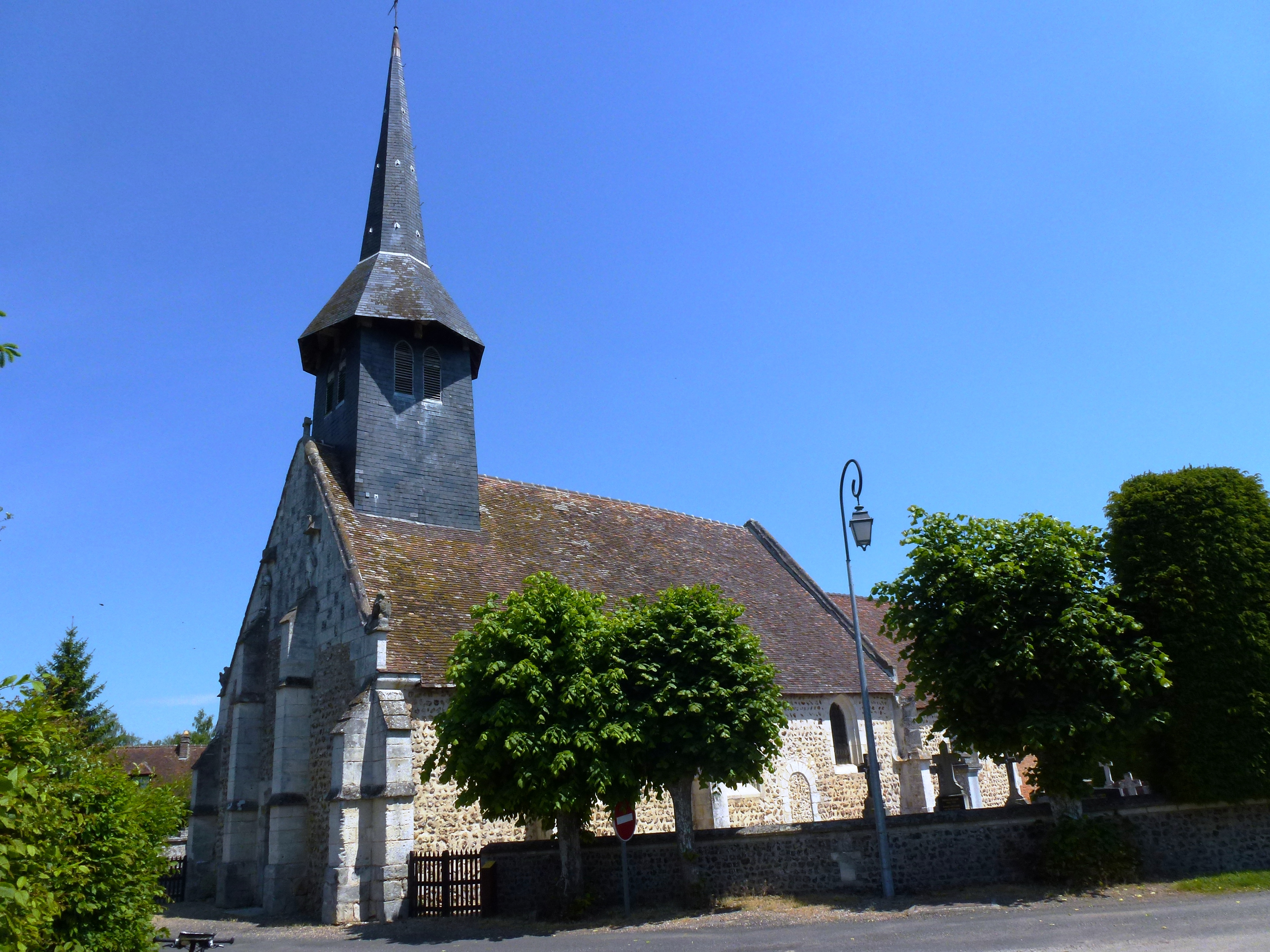
- The church of Saint-Aignan in La Houssaye
- Location of La Houssaye
- Location within France Location within Normandy
- Coordinates: 48°59′38″N 0°48′04″E
- Country: France
- Region: Normandy
- Department: Eure
- Arrondissement: Bernay
- Canton: Brionne

Government
  - Mayor (2020–2026): Claude Georges
- Area^{1}: 4.25 km^{2} (1.64 sq mi)
- Elevation: 122 m (400 ft)
- Highest elevation: 167 m (548 ft)
- Lowest elevation: 110 m (360 ft)
- Population (2023): 209
  - Density: 49.2/km^{2} (127/sq mi)
- Time zone: UTC+01:00 (CET)
  - Summer (DST): UTC+02:00 (CEST)
- INSEE/Postal code: 27345 /27410
- ^{1} French Land Register data, which excludes lakes, ponds, glaciers > 1 km^{2} (0.386 sq mi or 247 acres) and river estuaries.

La Houssaye (French pronunciation: [la usɛ]) is a commune in the Eure department in northern France.

== Geography ==
The commune along with another 69 communes shares part of a 4,747 hectare, Natura 2000 conservation area, called Risle, Guiel, Charentonne.

== Population ==
Historical population
| Year | Pop. | ±% p.a. |
|---|---|---|
| 1968 | 86 | — |
| 1975 | 83 | −0.51% |
| 1982 | 123 | +5.78% |
| 1990 | 157 | +3.10% |
| 1999 | 183 | +1.72% |
| 2007 | 191 | +0.54% |
| 2012 | 218 | +2.68% |
| 2017 | 210 | −0.74% |
| 2023 | 209 | −0.08% |
Source: INSEE

== See also ==
- Communes of the Eure department
