= Barquet =

- Commune
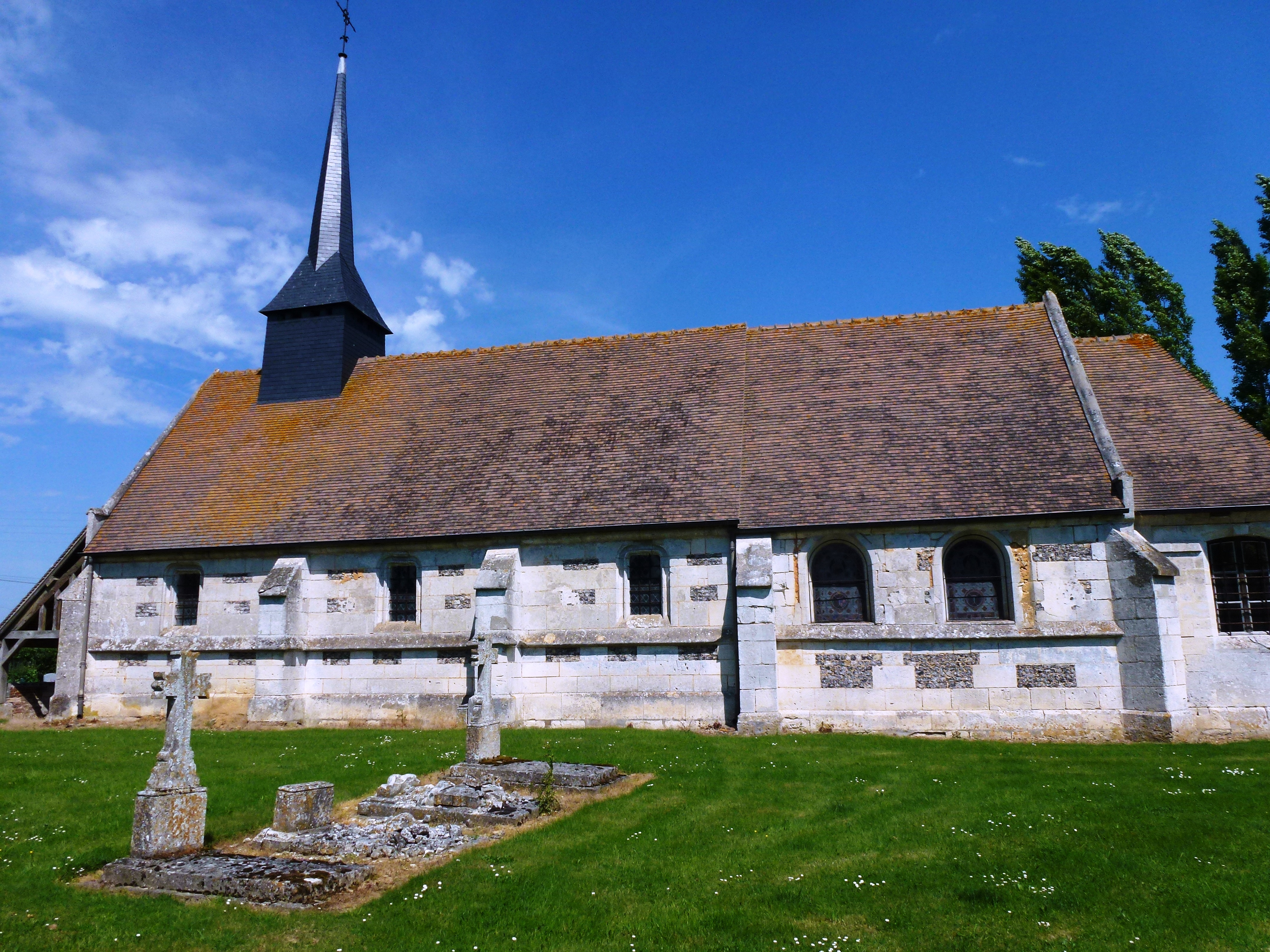
- The church in Barquet
- Location of Barquet
- Location within France Location within Normandy
- Coordinates: 49°02′49″N 0°51′34″E
- Country: France
- Region: Normandy
- Department: Eure
- Arrondissement: Bernay
- Canton: Brionne

Government
  - Mayor (2020–2026): Dominique Mabire
- Area^{1}: 13.68 km^{2} (5.28 sq mi)
- Elevation: 126 m (413 ft)
- Highest elevation: 161 m (528 ft)
- Lowest elevation: 101 m (331 ft)
- Population (2023): 449
  - Density: 32.8/km^{2} (85.0/sq mi)
- Time zone: UTC+01:00 (CET)
  - Summer (DST): UTC+02:00 (CEST)
- INSEE/Postal code: 27040 /27170
- ^{1} French Land Register data, which excludes lakes, ponds, glaciers > 1 km^{2} (0.386 sq mi or 247 acres) and river estuaries.

Barquet (French pronunciation: [baʁkɛ]) is a commune in the Eure department in Normandy in northern France.

== Geography ==
The commune along with another 69 communes shares part of a 4,747 hectare, Natura 2000 conservation area, called Risle, Guiel, Charentonne.

== Population ==
Historical population
Year	Pop.	±% p.a.
1968	302	—
1975	295	−0.33%
1982	316	+0.99%
1990	289	−1.11%
1999	359	+2.44%
2007	348	−0.39%
2012	425	+4.08%
2017	449	+1.10%
2023	449	+0.00%
Source: INSEE

== See also ==
- Communes of the Eure department
