= Saint-Victor-d'Épine =

- Commune
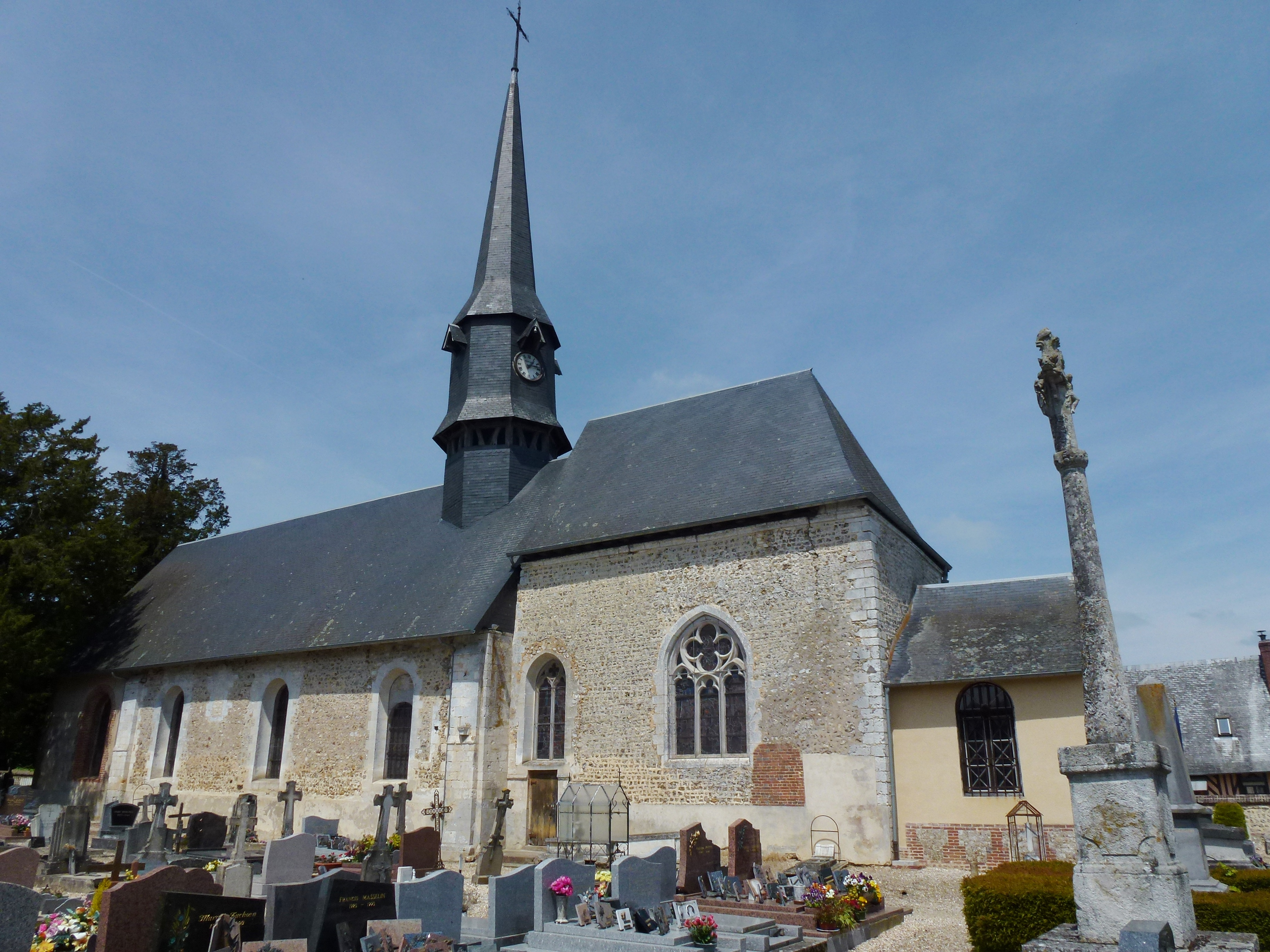
- The church in Saint-Victor-d'Épine
- Location of Saint-Victor-d'Épine
- Location within France Location within Normandy
- Coordinates: 49°12′36″N 0°36′28″E
- Country: France
- Region: Normandy
- Department: Eure
- Arrondissement: Bernay
- Canton: Brionne

Government
  - Mayor (2020–2026): Jean Plénécassagne
- Area^{1}: 7.89 km^{2} (3.05 sq mi)
- Elevation: 170 m (560 ft)
- Highest elevation: 169 m (554 ft)
- Lowest elevation: 110 m (360 ft)
- Population (2023): 335
  - Density: 42.5/km^{2} (110/sq mi)
- Time zone: UTC+01:00 (CET)
  - Summer (DST): UTC+02:00 (CEST)
- INSEE/Postal code: 27609 /27800
- ^{1} French Land Register data, which excludes lakes, ponds, glaciers > 1 km^{2} (0.386 sq mi or 247 acres) and river estuaries.

Saint-Victor-d'Épine (French pronunciation: [sɛ̃ viktɔʁ depin]) is a commune in the Eure department in Normandy in northern France.

== Population ==
Historical population
Year	Pop.	±% p.a.
1968	324	—
1975	256	−3.31%
1982	293	+1.95%
1990	286	−0.30%
1999	280	−0.24%
2007	321	+1.72%
2012	319	−0.12%
2017	321	+0.13%
2023	335	+0.71%
Source: INSEE

== See also ==
- Communes of the Eure department
