= Saint-Éloi-de-Fourques =

- Commune
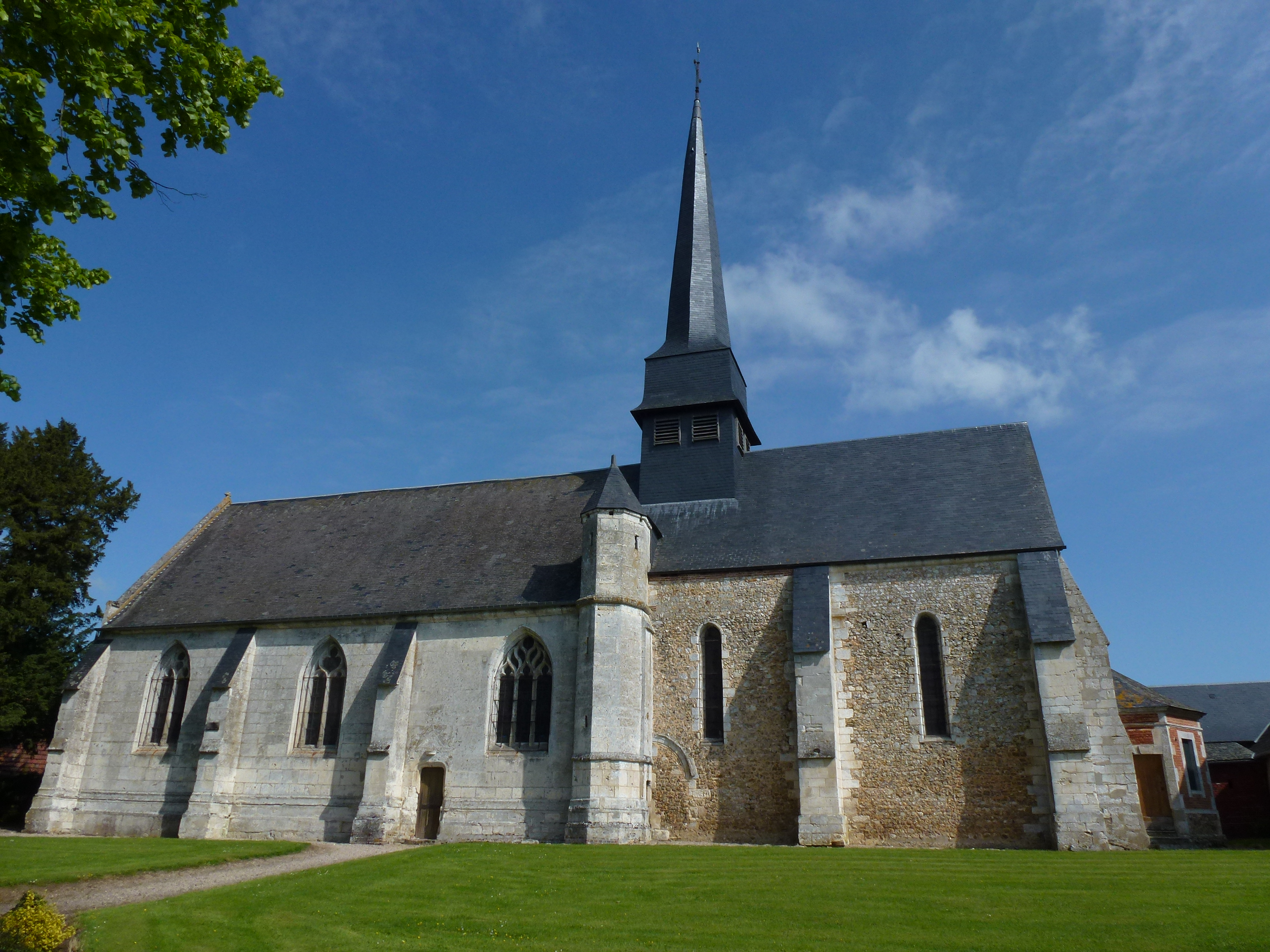
- The church in Saint-Éloi-de-Fourques
- Location of Saint-Éloi-de-Fourques
- Location within France Location within Normandy
- Coordinates: 49°13′57″N 0°47′49″E
- Country: France
- Region: Normandy
- Department: Eure
- Arrondissement: Bernay
- Canton: Brionne

Government
  - Mayor (2020–2026): Denis Szalkowski
- Area^{1}: 7.23 km^{2} (2.79 sq mi)
- Elevation: 152 m (499 ft)
- Highest elevation: 159 m (522 ft)
- Lowest elevation: 115 m (377 ft)
- Population (2023): 537
  - Density: 74.3/km^{2} (192/sq mi)
- Time zone: UTC+01:00 (CET)
  - Summer (DST): UTC+02:00 (CEST)
- INSEE/Postal code: 27536 /27800
- Website: www.saint-eloi-de-fourques.net
- ^{1} French Land Register data, which excludes lakes, ponds, glaciers > 1 km^{2} (0.386 sq mi or 247 acres) and river estuaries.

Saint-Éloi-de-Fourques (French pronunciation: [sɛ̃.t‿elwa də fuʁk]) is a commune in the Eure department and Normandy region in northern France.

== Population ==
Historical population
Year	Pop.	±% p.a.
1968	284	—
1975	262	−1.15%
1982	311	+2.48%
1990	360	+1.85%
1999	419	+1.70%
2007	426	+0.21%
2012	475	+2.20%
2017	522	+1.90%
2023	537	+0.47%
Source: INSEE

== See also ==
- Communes of the Eure department
