= Calleville =

- Commune
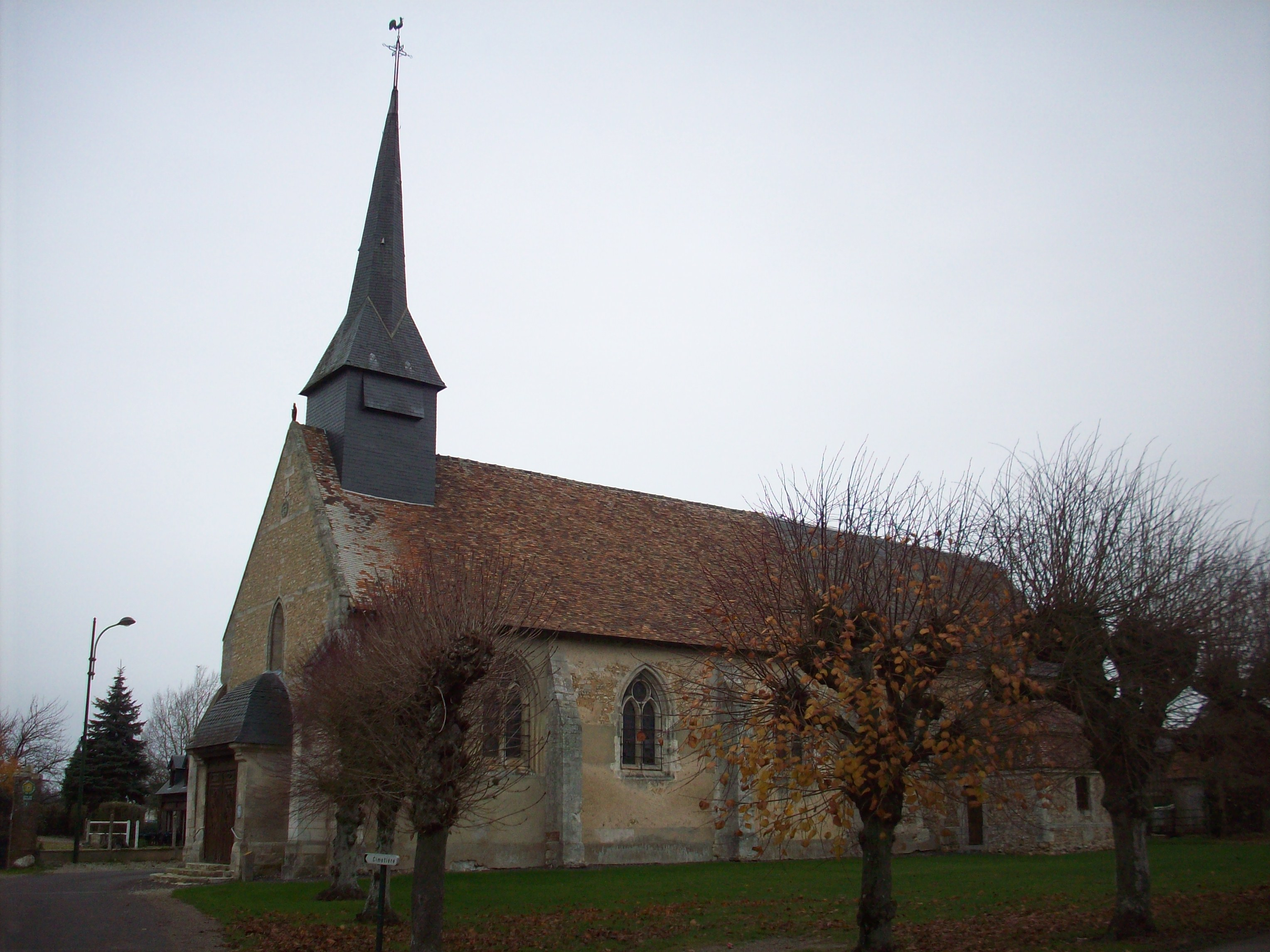
- The church in Calleville
- Location of Calleville
- Location within France Location within Normandy
- Coordinates: 49°11′33″N 0°45′30″E
- Country: France
- Region: Normandy
- Department: Eure
- Arrondissement: Bernay
- Canton: Brionne
- Intercommunality: Bernay Terres de Normandie

Government
  - Mayor (2020–2026): Frédéric Scribot
- Area^{1}: 8.57 km^{2} (3.31 sq mi)
- Elevation: 126 m (413 ft)
- Highest elevation: 144 m (472 ft)
- Lowest elevation: 65 m (213 ft)
- Population (2023): 665
  - Density: 77.6/km^{2} (201/sq mi)
- Time zone: UTC+01:00 (CET)
  - Summer (DST): UTC+02:00 (CEST)
- INSEE/Postal code: 27125 /27800
- ^{1} French Land Register data, which excludes lakes, ponds, glaciers > 1 km^{2} (0.386 sq mi or 247 acres) and river estuaries.

Calleville (French pronunciation: [kalvil]) is a commune in the Eure department in northern France.

== Geography ==
The commune along with another 69 communes shares part of a 4,747 hectare, Natura 2000 conservation area, called Risle, Guiel, Charentonne.

== Population ==
Historical population
Year	Pop.	±% p.a.
1968	345	—
1975	427	+3.09%
1982	493	+2.07%
1990	551	+1.40%
1999	543	−0.16%
2007	586	+0.96%
2012	669	+2.68%
2017	669	+0.00%
2023	665	−0.10%
Source: INSEE

== See also ==
- Communes of the Eure department
