= Franqueville, Eure =

Franqueville
- Commune
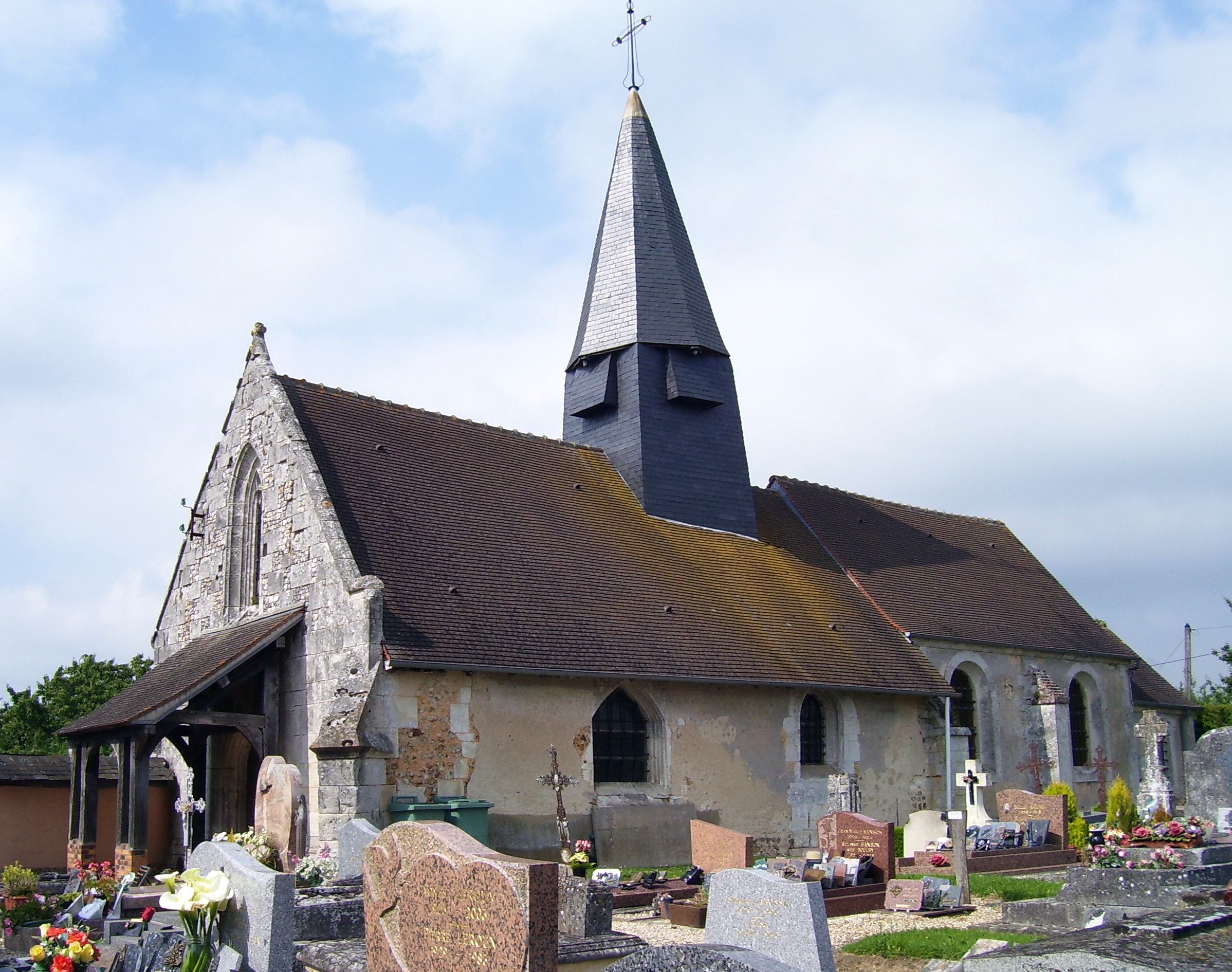
- Church of Our Lady (Notre-Dame)
- Location of Franqueville
- Location within France Location within Normandy
- Coordinates: 49°10′32″N 0°41′27″E
- Country: France
- Region: Normandy
- Department: Eure
- Arrondissement: Bernay
- Canton: Brionne

Government
  - Mayor (2024–2026): Patrick Brun
- Area^{1}: 3.03 km^{2} (1.17 sq mi)
- Elevation: 142 m (466 ft)
- Highest elevation: 157 m (515 ft)
- Lowest elevation: 129 m (423 ft)
- Population (2023): 300
  - Density: 99/km^{2} (260/sq mi)
- Time zone: UTC+01:00 (CET)
  - Summer (DST): UTC+02:00 (CEST)
- INSEE/Postal code: 27266 /27800
- ^{1} French Land Register data, which excludes lakes, ponds, glaciers > 1 km^{2} (0.386 sq mi or 247 acres) and river estuaries.

Franqueville (French pronunciation: [fʁɑ̃kvil]) is a commune in the Eure department in the Normandy region in northern France.

== Population ==
Historical population
Year	Pop.	±% p.a.
1968	94	—
1975	116	+3.05%
1982	174	+5.96%
1990	273	+5.79%
1999	256	−0.71%
2007	259	+0.15%
2012	322	+4.45%
2017	332	+0.61%
2023	300	−1.68%
Source: INSEE

== See also ==
- Communes of the Eure department
