= Saint-Éloy =

Saint-Éloy may refer to places in France:

- Saint-Eloy, Finistère
- Saint-Éloy-d'Allier
- Saint-Éloy-de-Gy, Cher
- Saint-Éloy-la-Glacière, Puy-de-Dôme
- Saint-Éloy-les-Mines, Puy-de-Dôme
- Saint-Éloy-les-Tuileries, Corrèze

== See also ==
- Sint-Elooi or St. Eloi (Ypres), Belgium
