= Authou =

- Commune
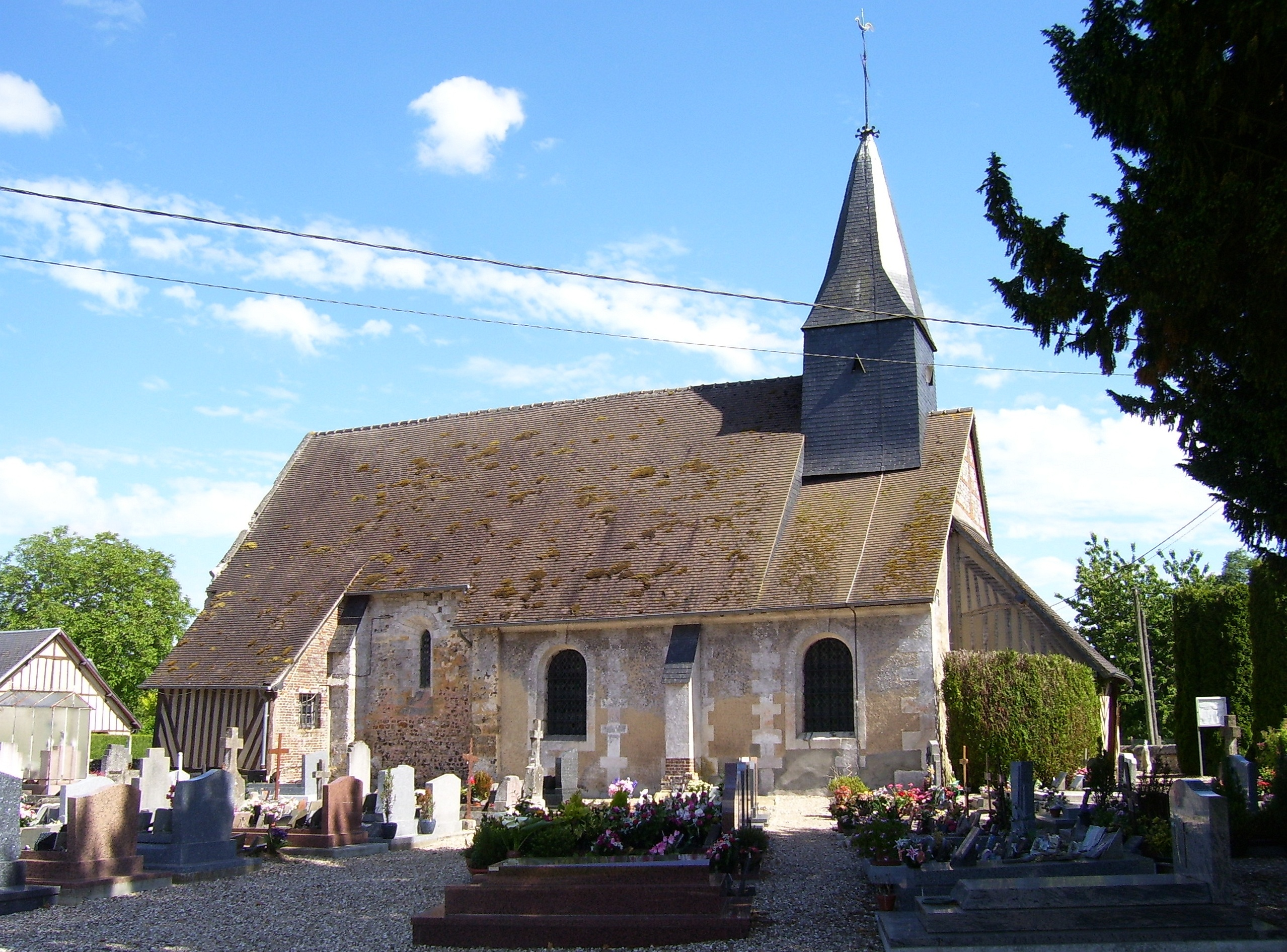
- Church of Saint-Aubin
- Location of Authou
- Location within France Location within Normandy
- Coordinates: 49°13′55″N 0°41′37″E
- Country: France
- Region: Normandy
- Department: Eure
- Arrondissement: Bernay
- Canton: Pont-Audemer
- Intercommunality: CC Pont-Audemer Val de Risle

Government
  - Mayor (2024–2026): Bruno Lechaptois
- Area^{1}: 2.96 km^{2} (1.14 sq mi)
- Elevation: 45 m (148 ft)
- Highest elevation: 120 m (390 ft)
- Lowest elevation: 43 m (141 ft)
- Population (2023): 331
  - Density: 112/km^{2} (290/sq mi)
- Time zone: UTC+01:00 (CET)
  - Summer (DST): UTC+02:00 (CEST)
- INSEE/Postal code: 27028 /27290
- ^{1} French Land Register data, which excludes lakes, ponds, glaciers > 1 km^{2} (0.386 sq mi or 247 acres) and river estuaries.

Authou (French pronunciation: [otu]) is a commune in the Eure department in Normandy in northern France.

== Geography ==
The commune along with another 69 communes shares part of a 4,747 hectare, Natura 2000 conservation area, called Risle, Guiel, Charentonne.

== Population ==
Historical population
Year	Pop.	±% p.a.
1968	362	—
1975	334	−1.14%
1982	283	−2.34%
1990	306	+0.98%
1999	321	+0.53%
2007	343	+0.83%
2012	340	−0.18%
2017	338	−0.12%
2023	331	−0.35%
Source: INSEE

== See also ==
- Communes of the Eure department
