= Nakayama (surname) =

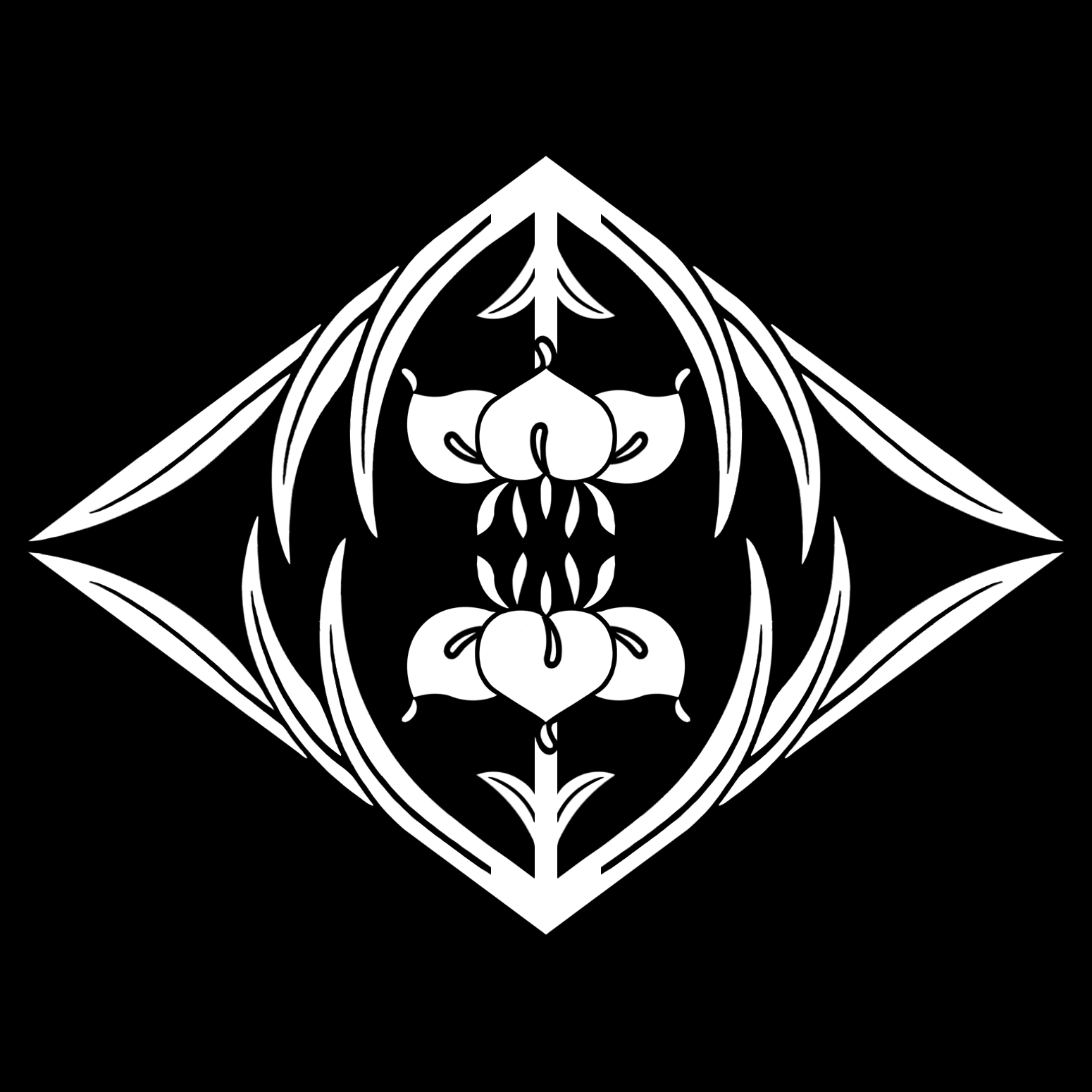
- Mon of the aristocratic Nakayama family
- Language: Japanese

Origin
- Meaning: Naka (中) : Central; Yama (山) : Mountain
- Region of origin: Japan

Nakayama (written: 中山 lit. "Central Mountain") is a Japanese surname.

The Nakayama are descended from 12th century aristocrat Nakayama Tadachika, most notably as the mother of the Emperor Meiji, Nakayama Yoshiko. Only a handful of Nakayama today have direct ties to this branch and entitled to use the kakitsubata bishi mon.

Other families carrying the Nakayama name today may have adopted the name as retainers or servants to the clan. One such family descended from the 16th century Nakayama Iekatsu went on to serve under Tokugawa Ieyasu at the Battle of Sekigahara and given the Matsuoka Domain as a reward. This branch uses the itadori mon.

Today, Nakayama is the 57th most common name in Japan as of 2008, belonging to approximately 1 out of 474 people, or 270,000 individuals. They are most prevalent in the Tokyo area.

The Japanese reading of the characters in one of Chinese leader Sun Yat-sen's familiar names, Sun Zhongshan (孫中山), is also read as "Nakayama" in Japanese.

Other notable people with the surname include:

(Names are listed by field, alphabetically by given name in the western convention of given-name, surname for clarity.)

== Academics ==
- Gishu Nakayama (1900–1969), author
- Ichiro Nakayama (1898–1981), economist
- Ken Nakayama (born 1942), American psychologist known for prosopagnosia
- Paula A. Nakayama (born 1953), Hawaii Supreme Court justice
- Tadachika Nakayama (1131–1195), Japanese court noble and author
- Tadashi Nakayama (1912–1964), mathematician
- Tadashi Nakayama (1927–2014), artist

== Arts and entertainment ==
- Erina Nakayama (actress, born 1987) (中山 恵里奈; born 1987), Japanese voice actress
- Erina Nakayama (actress, born 1995) (中山 絵梨奈; born 1995), Japanese actress
- Miho Nakayama (中山 美穂; 1970–2024), actress, model, and singer
- Nana Nakayama (中山 菜々; born 1992), real name of Nana Yamada, Japanese idol, actor, and talent
- Sara Nakayama or Manami Nakayama (born 1974), voice actress
- Shinpei Nakayama (1887–1952), songwriter
- Shinobu Nakayama (born 1973), actress and singer
- Tracy Nakayama (born 1974), American artist
- Uri Nakayama (born 1981), singer-songwriter
- Yuma Nakayama (1994), actor and singer
- Yūsuke Nakayama or Yūsuke Santamaria (born 1971), playwright and entertainer

== Politics ==
- Kyoko Nakayama (born 1940), politician and party leader
- Masa Nakayama (1891–1976), politician and first female cabinet minister in Japan
- Nobuzane Nakayama (1865–1934), baron, son of the last daimyo of the Matsuoka domain
- Shō Nakayama or Sun Yat-sen (1866–1925), first President of the Republic of China
- Tadayasu Nakayama (1809–1888), scion of the Fujiwara, guardian to Emperor Meiji
- Takamaro Nakayama (1851–1919), marquess, chamberlain to the crown prince Taishō
- Taro Nakayama (1924–2023), Japanese politician, Minister for Foreign Affairs (1989–1991)
- Tosiwo Nakayama (1931–2007), 1st President of the Federated States of Micronesia
- Yoshiko Nakayama (1836–1907), concubine to Emperor Kōmei, mother of Emperor Meiji

== Sports and martial arts ==
- Akinori Nakayama (中山 彰規; 1943–2025), Olympic gymnast
- Ayako Nakayama (中山 綾子; born 1987), Japanese cricketer
- Chikako Nakayama (中山 智香子; born 1975), Japanese badminton player
- Funa Nakayama (中山 楓奈; born 2005), Japanese skateboarder
- Hakudo Nakayama (中山 博道; 1873–1958), martial artist
- Iwao Nakayama (中山 巌; born 1949), Japanese ice hockey player
- Jun Nakayama (中山 隼; born 1981), Japanese curler
- Katsuhiro Nakayama (中山 克広; born 1996), Japanese footballer
- Masashi Nakayama (中山 雅史; born 1967), professional soccer player
- Masatoshi Nakayama (中山 正敏; 1913–1987), karate master
- Riku Nakayama (中山 陸; born 2001), Japanese footballer
- Takeyuki Nakayama (中山 竹通; born 1959), Japanese marathon runner
- Yuhki Nakayama (中山 友貴; born 1987), Japanese racing driver
- Yuki Nakayama (中山 雄希; born 1994), Japanese footballer
- Yukie Nakayama (中山 由起枝; born 1979), Japanese sport shooter

== Others ==
- Gordon Goichi Nakayama (中山 吾一, 1900–1995), Japanese Canadian Anglican priest
- Hayao Nakayama (中山 隼雄; born 1932), Japanese businessman
- Jimmy Nakayama (1943–1965), U.S. Army Pfc. participated in the Battle of la Drang, Vietnam
- Miki Nakayama (1798–1887), founder of the Tenrikyo religion
- Niki Nakayama (born 1975), American Michelin-starred chef
- Yasubei Nakayama or Horibe Yasubei (1670–1703), samurai and master swordsman
