= Princess Nobuko Asaka =

Japanese princess (1891–1933)

Nobuko
- Princess Asaka
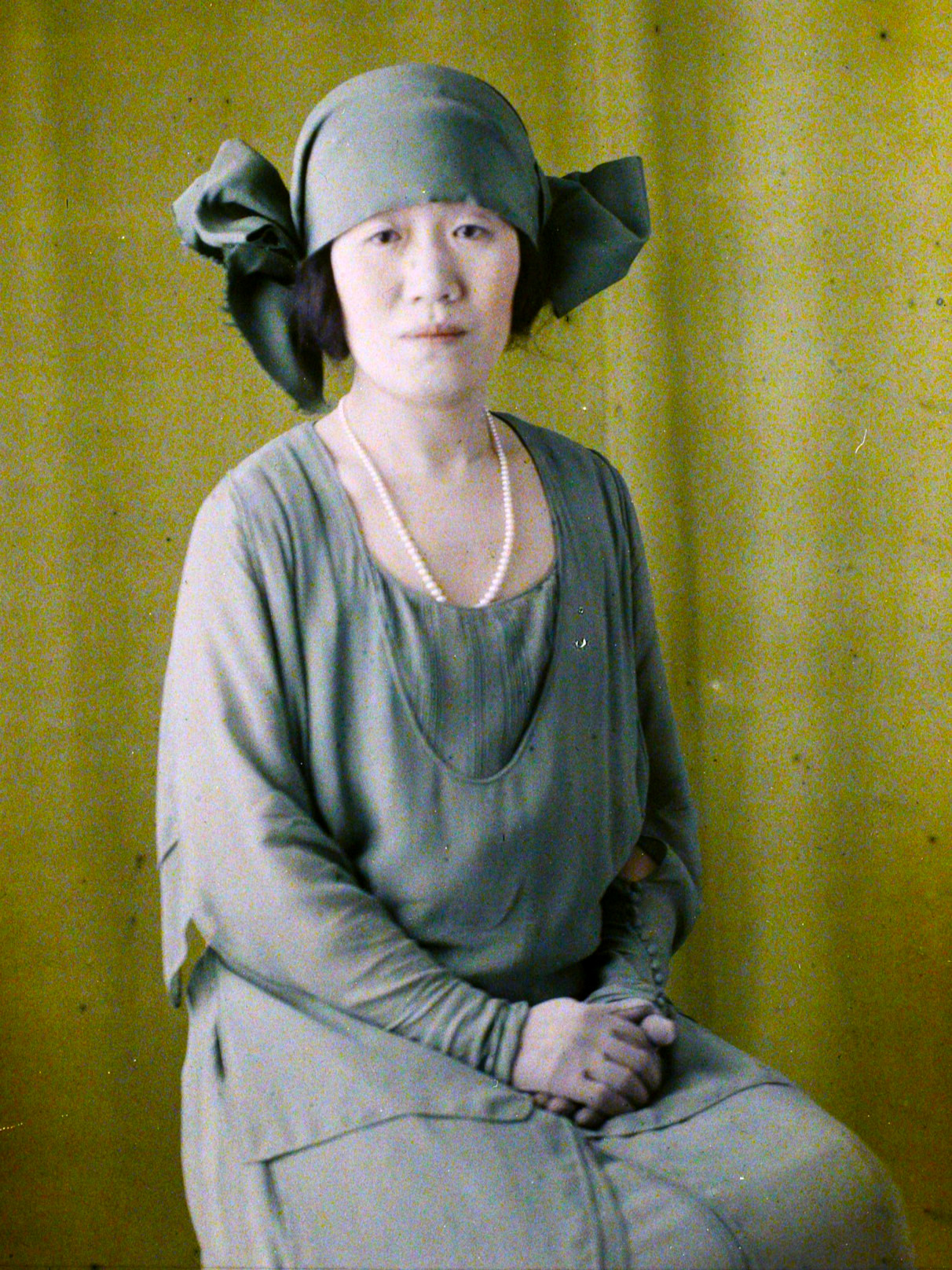
- 1923 Autochrome by Georges Chevalier
- Born: Nobuko, Princess Fumi (富美宮允子内親王); 7 August 1891; Tokyo Prefecture, Japan
- Died: 3 November 1933 (aged 42); Tokyo Prefecture, Japan
- Burial: Toshimagaoka Imperial Cemetery, Bunkyo, Tokyo
- Spouse: Prince Yasuhiko Asaka (m. 1909)
- Issue: Princess Kikuko of Asaka; Prince Takahiko of Asaka; Prince Tadahito of Asaka; Princess Kiyoko of Asaka
- House: Imperial House of Japan
- Father: Emperor Meiji
- Mother: Sono Sachiko

Nobuko, Princess Asaka (鳩彦王妃允子内親王, Yasuhiko Ōhi Nobuko Naishinnō), born Nobuko, Princess Fumi (富美宮允子内親王, Fumi-no-miya Nobuko Naishinnō; 7 August 1891 – 3 November 1933), was the twelfth child and eighth daughter of Emperor Meiji of Japan, and the fifth child and fourth daughter of Sono Sachiko, the Emperor's fifth concubine.

== Biography ==
Princess Nobuko was born in Tokyo, Japan, as a daughter of Emperor Meiji and his Imperial Concubine Sono Sachiko. She held the childhood appellation "Fumi-no-miya" (Princess Fumi).

Her future husband, Prince Yasuhiko Asaka, was the eighth son of Prince Asahiko Kuni and the court lady Sugako Tsunoda. Prince Yasuhiko was also a half-brother of Prince Naruhiko Higashikuni, Prince Morimasa Nashimoto, Prince Kuninori Kaya, and Prince Kuniyoshi Kuni, the father of the future Empress Kōjun, the consort of Emperor Shōwa. On 10 March 1906, Emperor Meiji granted Prince Yasuhiko the title Asaka-no-miya and authorization to begin a new branch of the imperial family. On 6 May 1910, Prince Asaka married Princess Fumi. Prince and Princess Asaka had four children:

1. Princess Kikuko Asaka (紀久子女王, Kikuko Joō; 12 September 1911 – 12 February 1989); married Marquis Nabeshima Naoyasu in 1931. Last grandchild of Emperor Meiji to have been born during his lifetime.
2. Prince Takahiko Asaka (孚彦王, Takahiko Ō; 8 October 1912 – 6 May 1994); married Todo Chikako, the fifth daughter of Count Todo Takatsugu. They had two daughters, Fukuko and Minoko and a son Tomohiko.
3. Prince Tadahito Asaka (正彦王, Tadahito Ō; 5 January 1914 – 6 February 1944), renounced membership in the imperial family and created Marquis Otowa, 1936. Killed in action during the Battle of Kwajalein);
4. Princess Kiyoko Asaka (湛子女王, Kiyoko Joō; 2 August 1919 – 1 August 2019); married Count Ogyu Yoshiatsu, died 1 day before her 100th birthday. She was the last surviving grandchild of Emperor Meiji.

Nobuko died on 3 November 1933, aged 42, due to kidney disease.

== Honours ==
- Grand Cordon of the Order of the Precious Crown

== Ancestry ==
Ancestors of Princess Nobuko Asaka

16. Emperor Kōkaku (1771–1840)
8. Emperor Ninkō (1800–1846)
17. Lady Kanshuuji Tadako (1780–1843)
4. Emperor Kōmei (1831–1867)
18. Ōgimachi Sanemitsu (1777–1817)
9. Lady Ōgimachi Naoko (1803–1856)
19. Lady Yotsuji Chieko
2. Emperor Meiji (1852–1912)
20. Nakayama Tadayori (1778–1825)
10. Marquess Nakayama Tadayasu (1809–1888)
21. Ōgimachisanjō Tsunako (d. 1858)
5. Lady Nakayama Yoshiko (1836–1907)
22. Matsura Seizan, 9th Lord of Hirado (1760–1841)
11. Matsura Aiko (1818–1906)
23. Mori
1. Nobuko, Princess Fumi
24. Nakayama Tadaosa (1756–1809)
12. Sono Motoshige (1793–1840)
25. Sanjō Narakimi
6. Count Sono Motosachi (1833–1905)
26. Matsura Seizan, 9th Lord of Hirado (1760–1841)
13. Matsura Kiko
27. Mori
3. Lady Sono Sachiko (1867–1947)
28. Koide Fusatake, 7th Lord of Sonobe (1775–1821)
14. Koide Fusaoki, 8th Lord of Sonobe (1810–1862)
29. Wakebe
7. Koide
30. Matsudaira Yasutō, 8th Lord of Hamada (1779–1841)
15. Matsudaira Minematsu
31. Matsudaira (d. 1805)
