= Hamuro =

Hamuro (written: 葉室) is a Japanese surname. Notable people with the surname include:

- Hamuro Mitsuko (葉室 光子, 1853–1873), Japanese concubine
- Hamuro Mitsutoshi (葉室 光俊, 1203–1276), Japanese poet
- Tetsuo Hamuro (葉室 鐵夫, 1917–2005), Japanese swimmer
