= Kotoko =

Kotoko may refer to:

== People with the given name ==
- Kotoko (musician), a Japanese singer
- Chigusa Kotoko, a Japanese concubine of Emperor Meiji
- Kotoko, a character from Chobits
- Kotoko Aihara, a character from Itazura na Kiss
- Kotoko Utsugi, a character from Danganronpa Another Episode: Ultra Despair Girls
- Kotoko Iwanaga, a character from In/Spectre
- Kotoko Imai, a character from Mewkledreamy

== Film ==
- Kotoko (film), a Japanese film

== Other ==
- Asante Kotoko, a top Ghanaian football club sometimes called Kotoko for short.
- Kotoko F.C., a Togolese football club
- The Kotoko kingdom of West Africa
- The Kotoko languages of West Africa
- The Kotoko people of West Africa
- The Nzema Kotoko F.C. Ghanaian professional football club
