= Gokoku-ji =

Buddhist temple in Tokyo, Japan

Gokoku-ji 護国寺
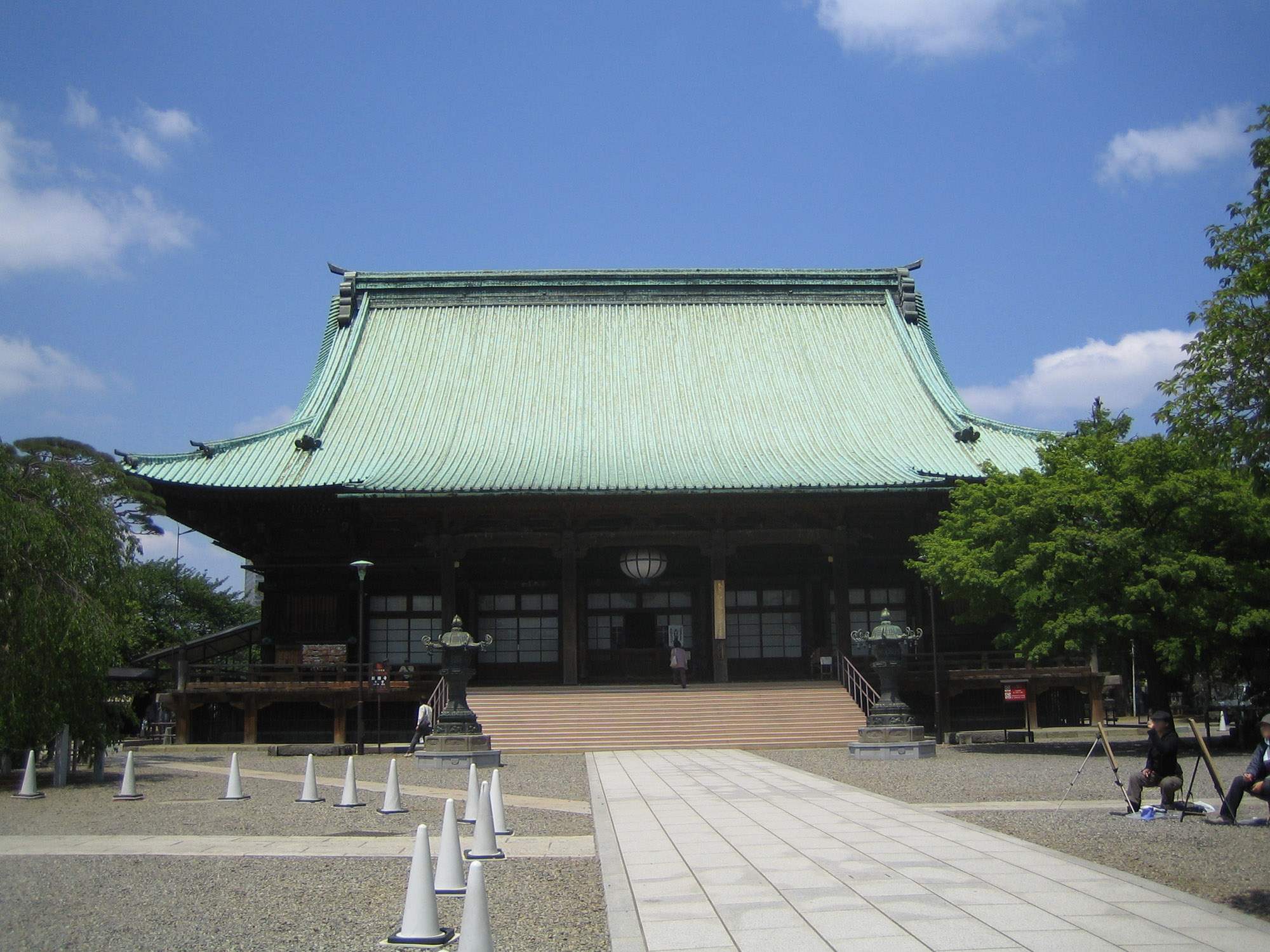
- Honden (main hall), an Important Cultural Property of Japan

Religion
- Affiliation: Buzan School of Shingon Buddhism
- Deity: Nyoirin Kannon (Chintamanicakra)

Location
- Location: 5-40-1 Ōtsuka, Bunkyō, Tokyo; 35°43′18.3″N 139°43′32.3″E
- Country: Japan
- Interactive map of Gokoku-ji 護国寺

Architecture
- Founder: Keishō-in
- Completed: 1681

Website
- http://www.gokokuji.or.jp/

Location

Gokoku-ji (護国寺; Japanese pronunciation: [ɡò̞.kó̞.kɯ̈́.(ɟ̟͡)ʑí]) is a Shingon Buddhist temple in Tokyo's Bunkyō.

== History ==
This Buddhist temple was established by the fifth shōgun Tokugawa Tsunayoshi, who dedicated it to his mother. It is notable for surviving the American air raids during World War II, whereas most other historical sites in Tokyo were turned into rubble.

== Tea Ceremony ==
Starting in the 1920's, tea master Takahashi Souan began building tea houses at Gokokuji temple. He purchased Gekkoden, (The Moonlight Pavilion) from Miidera Temple in Shiga prefecture. The building is one of the earliest surviving examples of Shoin-Zukuri architecture and is marked as an Important Cultural Property. There are also five tea houses on the property that regularly hold private tea ceremonies.

== Notable interments ==
Like many Buddhist temples in Japan, Gokoku-ji has a cemetery on its premises. Among those interred are the remains of the following people.

- Sanjō Sanetomi (1837–1891), the last Daijō Daijin.
- Yamada Akiyoshi (1844–1892), Minister of Industry (1879–1880), Home Minister (1881–1883) and Minister of Justice (1883–1891) and Lieutenant General in the Imperial Japanese Army, and the founder of Nihon Law School (current Nihon University) and Kokugakuin (current Kokugakuin University).
- Josiah Conder (1852–1920), a British architect and oyatoi gaikokujin.
- Ōkuma Shigenobu (1838–1922), the 8th (1898) and 17th (1914–1916) Prime Minister of Japan.
- Yamagata Aritomo (1838–1922), Field Marshal in the Imperial Japanese Army and the 3rd (1889–1891) and 9th (1898–1900) Prime Minister of Japan.
- Ōkura Kihachirō (1837–1928), an entrepreneur.
- Dan Takuma (1858–1932), a former Director-General of Mitsui (Mitsui Group).
- Seiji Noma (1878–1938), the founder of Kodansha.
- Masuda Takashi (1848–1938), the founder of Mitsui & Co. (Mitsui Bussan) and Chugai-Bukka-Sinpo (current Nihon Keizai Shimbun), and also known as a tea master.
- Ikeda Shigeaki (1867–1950), a politician and former governor of the Bank of Japan.
- Nakamura Tempū (1876–1968), a martial artist and preacher of yoga to Japan.
- Ōyama Masutatsu (1923–1994), a karate master and the founder of Kyokushin kaikan.
- Dan Ikuma (1924–2001), a composer. A grandson of Dan Takuma.
- Hamuro Mitsuko (1853-1873), concubine of Emperor Meiji
- Hashimoto Natsuko (1856-1873), concubine of Emperor Meiji
