= Sono Sachiko =

Concubine of Emperor Meiji of Japan

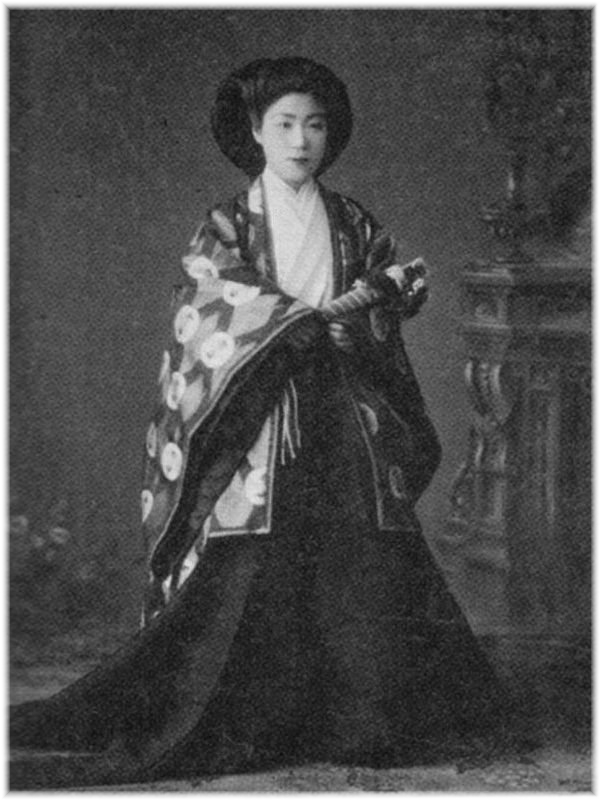
- Sono Sachiko in a traditional court dress

Imperial concubine to Emperor Meiji
- Tenure: ? – 1912
- Born: 23 December 1867; Heian-kyō (now Kyoto), Empire of Japan
- Died: 7 July 1947 (aged 79); Tokyo, Japan
- Burial: Saikōan Temple, Shsouinjuku, Tokyo
- Spouse: Emperor Meiji
- Issue among others...: Masako, Princess Takeda; Fusako, Princess Kitashirakawa; Nobuko, Princess Asaka; Toshiko, Princess Higashikuni
Names
- Sono Sachiko (園祥子)
- House: Imperial House of Japan
- Father: Count Sono Motosachi
- Religion: Shinto

Sono Sachiko (園祥子) (December 23, 1867 – July 7, 1947) was the fifth concubine of Emperor Meiji of Japan. Although Meiji was the last Japanese emperor to have more than one consort, the official role at court was not abolished until 1924; surviving concubines remained as members of the imperial family in retirement.

== Biography ==
Sachiko's father was Count Sono Motosachi (園基祥); she was known as Kogiku Tenji (小菊典侍). She gave birth to two sons and six daughters, several of whom died prematurely. Her children with Emperor Meiji include the following members of the Japanese imperial family:

- Princess Shizuko, the Princess Hisa (Hisa-no-miya Shizuko-naishinnō; 久宮静子内親王, February 10, 1886 – April 4, 1887), she died in infancy.
- Prince Michihito, the Prince Aki (Aki-no-miya Michihito-shinnō; 昭宮猷仁親王, August 22, 1887 – November 12, 1888), he died in infancy.
- Masako, the Princess Tsune (常宮昌子内親王, September 30, 1888 – March 8, 1940), she married Tsunehisa, the Prince Takeda in 1908 and became known as Masako, the Princess Takeda.
- Fusako, the Princess Kane (周宮房子内親王, January 28, 1890 – August 11, 1974), she married Naruhisa, the Prince Kitashirakawa in 1909 and became known as Fusako, the Princess Kitashirakawa.
- Nobuko, the Princess Fumi (富美宮允子内親王, August 7, 1891 – November 3, 1933), she married Yasuhiko, the Prince Asaka in 1909 and became known as Nobuko, the Princess Asaka.
- Prince Teruhito, the Prince Mitsu (Mitsu-no-miya Teruhito-shinnō; 満宮輝仁親王, November 30, 1893 – August 17, 1894), he died in infancy.
- Toshiko, The Princess Yasu (泰宮聡子内親王, May 11, 1896 – March 5, 1978), she married Naruhiko, the Prince Higashikuni in 1915 and became known as Toshiko, the Princess Higashikuni.
- Princess Takiko, the Princess Sada (Sada-no-miya Takiko-naishinnō; 貞宮多喜子内親王, September 24, 1897 – January 11, 1899), she died in infancy.

Following the death of Emperor Meiji in 1912, Sachiko became a member of the household of Empress Teimei, the consort of Emperor Taishō. She attended the birth of Takahito, Prince Mikasa in 1915.

Her tomb is at Saikōan Temple in Shinjuku, Tokyo.

== See also ==
- Empress Shōken, primary consort of Emperor Meiji, later Empress Dowager
- Hamuro Mitsuko, first concubine
- Hashimoto Natsuko, second concubine
- Yanagiwara Naruko, third concubine of Emperor Meiji, mother of Emperor Taishō
- Chigusa Kotoko, fourth concubine
