= Hashimoto Natsuko =

Second concubine of Emperor Meiji

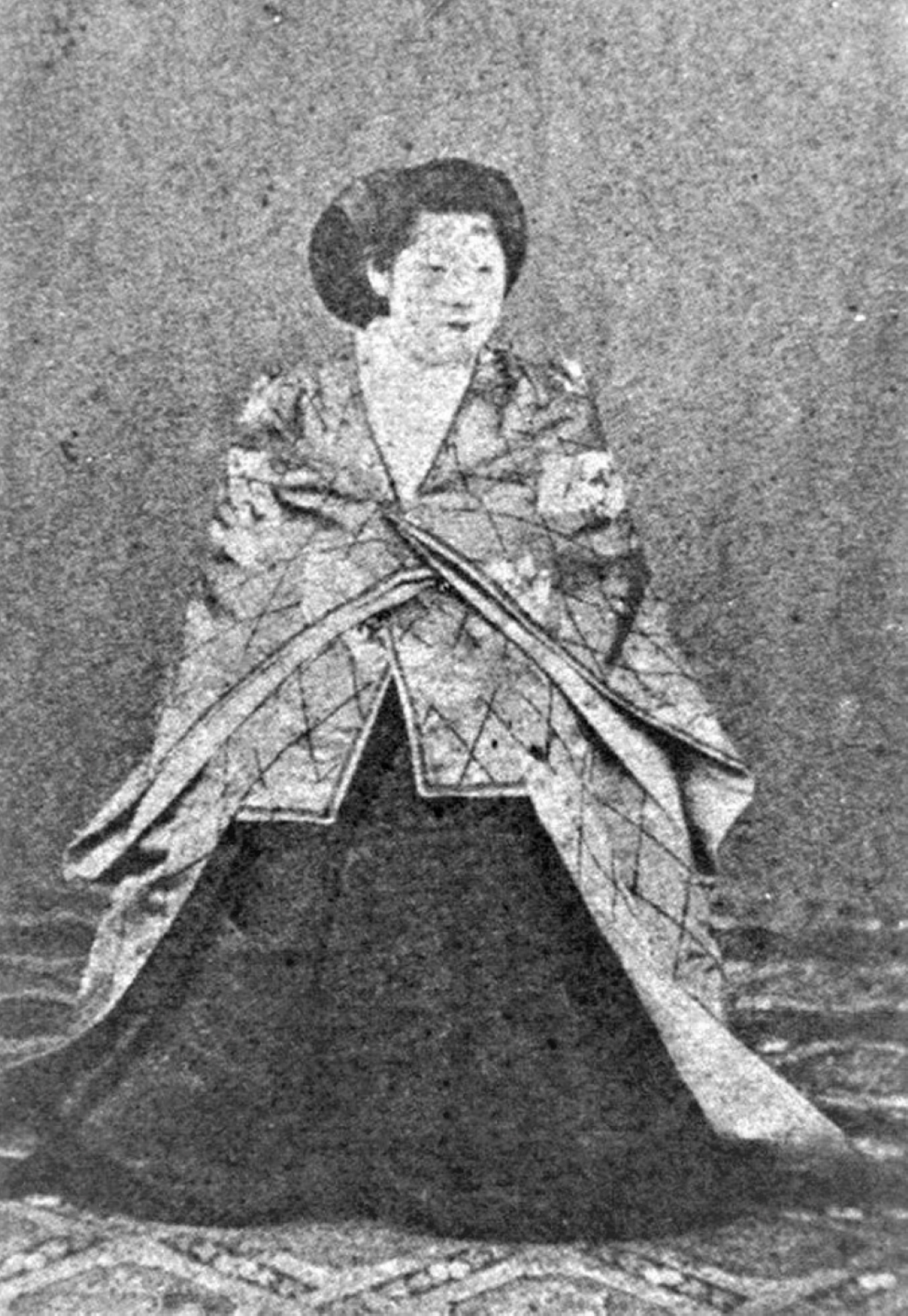

Hashimoto Natsuko (橋本 夏子; March 19, 1856 – November 14, 1873) was the second concubine of Emperor Meiji, and the mother of his first daughter Wakatakayori-hime no Mikoto (稚高依姫尊). Wakatakayori-hime no Mikoto was stillborn, and Natsuko died of complications from her delivery.

Natsuko was a daughter of the noblewoman Hashimoto Reiko (橋本麗子, 1835–1889), and she entered Meiji's service as a concubine in 1872. Natsuko's tomb is at Toshimagaoka Imperial Cemetery at Gokoku-ji in Bunkyo, Tokyo.

== See also ==
- Empress Shōken, primary consort of Emperor Meiji, later Empress Dowager
- Hamuro Mitsuko, first concubine
- Yanagihara Naruko, third concubine of Emperor Meiji, mother of Emperor Taishō
- Chigusa Kotoko, fourth concubine
- Sono Sachiko, fifth concubine
