= Hamuro Mitsuko =

Concubine of Emperor Meiji of Japan

- Born: February 3, 1853
- Died: September 22, 1873 (aged 20)
- Spouse: Emperor Meiji
- Issue: Wakamitsuteru-hiko no Mikoto

Hamuro Mitsuko (葉室 光子; February 3, 1853 – September 22, 1873) was the first concubine of Emperor Meiji, and the mother of his first child Wakamitsuteru-hiko no Mikoto (稚瑞照彦尊). Wakamitsuteru-hiko no Mikoto was stillborn, and Mitsuko died of complications from his delivery five days later. Mitsuko was assisted in the delivery by Kusumoto Ine, the first woman doctor of western medical training in Japan.

Mitsuko's tomb is at Toshimagaoka Imperial Cemetery at Gokoku-ji in Bunkyo, Tokyo.

== See also ==
- Empress Shōken, primary consort of Emperor Meiji, later Empress Dowager
- Hashimoto Natsuko, second concubine
- Yanagihara Naruko, third concubine of Emperor Meiji, mother of Emperor Taishō
- Chigusa Kotoko, fourth concubine
- Sono Sachiko, fifth concubine
