= Chigusa Kotoko =

Concubine of Emperor Meiji of Japan

Imperial concubine to Emperor Meiji
- Tenure: ? – 30 July 1912
- Born: 19 July 1855; Empire of Japan
- Died: 1 February 1944 (aged 88); Japan
- Spouse: Emperor Meiji
- Issue: Akiko, Princess Shige; Fumiko, Princess Masu
Names
- Chigusa Kotoko (千種任子)
- House: Imperial House of Japan
- Father: Viscount Chigusa Aritō
- Mother: Masako Yotsuji
- Religion: Shinto

Chigusa Kotoko (千種任子, July 19, 1855 – February 1, 1944) was the fourth concubine of Emperor Meiji. She gave birth to two daughters who died of meningitis in infancy. Although Meiji was the last Japanese emperor to have more than one consort, the official role at court was not abolished until 1924; surviving concubines remained as members of the imperial family in retirement.

== See also ==
- Empress Shōken, primary consort of Emperor Meiji, later Empress Dowager
- Hamuro Mitsuko, first concubine
- Hashimoto Natsuko, second concubine
- Yanagihara Naruko, third concubine of Emperor Meiji, mother of Emperor Taishō
- Sono Sachiko, fifth concubine
