= Tracy Nakayama =

American contemporary artist

Tracy Nakayama (born 1974) is a contemporary American artist who lives and works in Los Angeles, California and was born in Honolulu, Hawaii.

== Education ==
Nakayama received her MFA from the School of Visual Arts in New York, NY and her BFA from the California College of Arts and Crafts in Oakland, California.

== Work ==
Nakayama's ink drawings focus on the camp aesthetic of 1970s erotic imagery. Her sepia toned portraits explore a bygone era of sexual innocence and exploration, whose softcore aesthetic is adaptable to her feminist approach.

Nakayama's work has been exhibited widely throughout the U.S., Japan and Europe. Nakayama has had solo exhibitions at Hiromi Yoshii Gallery (Tokyo), Acuna-Hansen Gallery (Los Angeles), ATM Gallery (New York), and Bodybuilder and Sportsman Gallery (Chicago) among many others.

Nakayama is currently represented by Kinkead Contemporary in Los Angeles and Hiromi Yoshii Gallery in Tokyo, Japan.

Her pieces “Eats” (2002) and “Drinks” (2003) are part of the Museum of Modern Art’s (MoMA) permanent collection.

== Select bibliography ==
- Aoki, Miho. “Dreams in Aloha,” Dune, Summer 2006, vol.31.
- Nelson, Arty. “Tracy Nakayama,” Flaunt, 2006, Issue 71.
- Yood, James. “Reviews, Tracy Nakayama: Bodybuilder & Sportsman,” ArtForum, Summer 2005, 329.
- Lopez, Ruth. “Getting Leid,” Time Out Chicago, 17–24 March 2005, 53.
- Nelson, Arty. “Heavy Petting: Tracy Nakayama’s Sex from a Woman’s Perspective,” LA Weekly, 8 January 2004.
- “Tracy’s Page,” Sweet Action magazine, Issue 3, 2004.
  - “Antenna,” United Bamboo apparel featured, Harper's Bazaar Japan, November 2003.
- Honigman, Ana Finel. “Erotika,” Time Out New York, 1–8 August 2002, 51.
- Chick, Lynn. “Tracy Nakayama: Modern Culture; New York, New York,” zingmagazine, Issue 14, Winter 2001, 215–6.
- Saltz, Jerry. “Something Wild,” The Village Voice, 25 December 2001, 73.
