= Nakayama Yoshiko =

Japanese concubine (1836–1907)

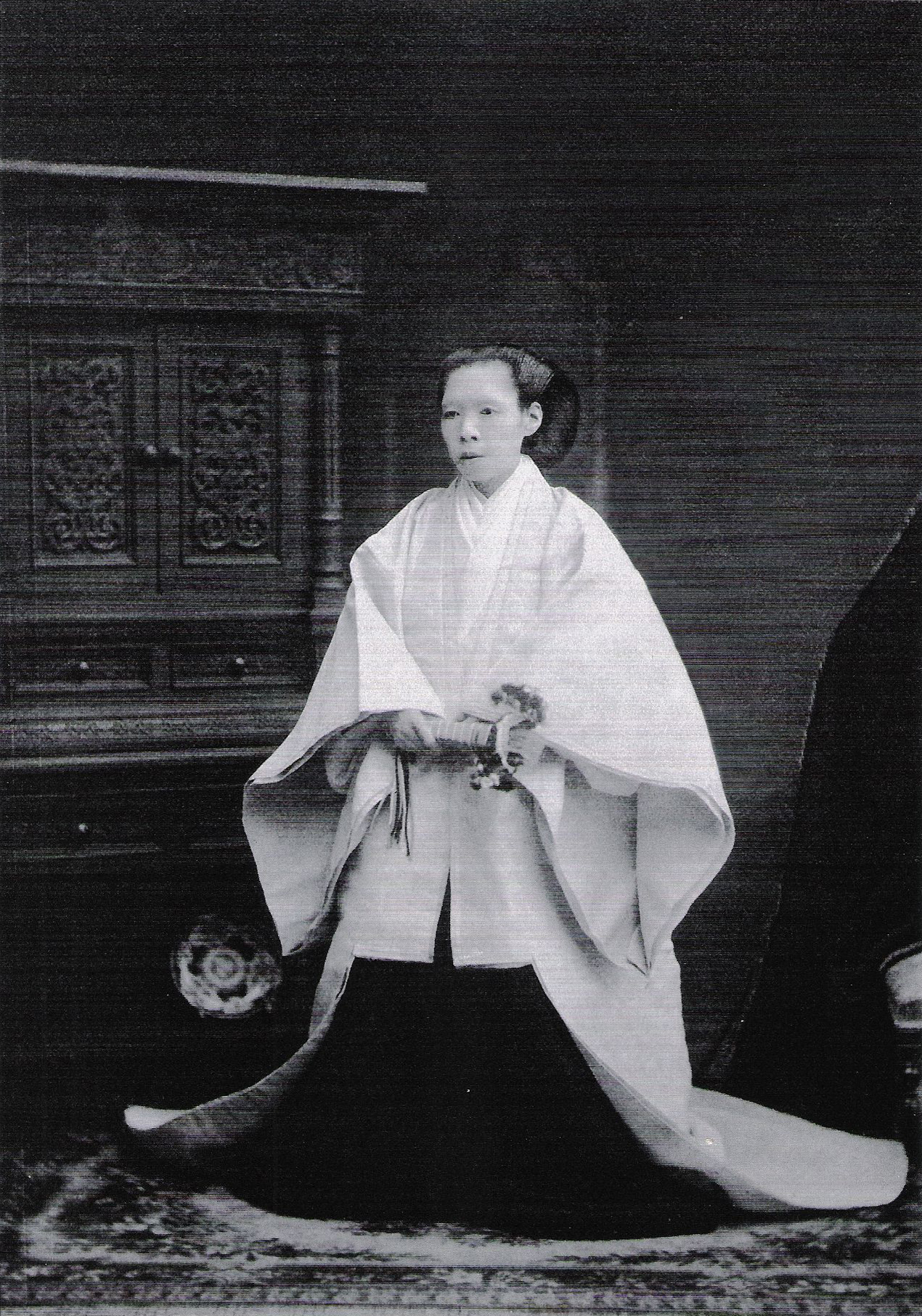
- Born: 16 January 1836; Heian-kyo, Tokugawa Shogunate (now Kyoto, Japan)
- Died: 5 October 1907 (aged 71)
- Burial: Toshimagaoka Imperial cemetery, Bunkyo, Tokyo
- Spouse: Emperor Kōmei
- Issue: Emperor Meiji
Names
- Yoshiko (慶子)
- House: Kōshitsu
- Father: Nakayama Tadayasu
- Mother: Matsura Aiko

Nakayama Yoshiko (中山慶子; 16 January 1836 – 5 October 1907) was a Japanese lady-in-waiting in the court of the Imperial House of Japan. She was a favourite concubine of Emperor Kōmei and the mother of Emperor Meiji.

== Biography ==
=== Parents ===
Nakayama Yoshiko was the daughter of Lord Nakayama Tadayasu, Minister of the Left (Sadaijin) and a member of the Fujiwara clan. Her mother was Matsura Aiko (1818–1906), the 11th daughter of the daimyō of the Hirado domain, Matsura Seizan.

=== At the court ===
She was born in Kyoto and entered service of the court at the age of 16. She became a concubine of Kōmei, who was also her third cousin once removed, and on 3 November 1852, gave birth to her only offspring Mutsuhito, later known as Emperor Meiji, at her father’s residence outside of the Kyoto Imperial Palace. She returned with her son to the Palace five years later. Her son was the only child born to Emperor Kōmei surviving to adulthood.

After the Meiji Restoration, she relocated to the new capital to Tokyo City in 1870 at the behest of her son the Emperor. She is buried in Toshimagaoka cemetery in Bunkyō, Tokyo.

== Honours ==
=== Decorations ===
- Grand Cordon of the Order of the Precious Crown (17 January 1900)

=== Order of precedence ===
- Third rank (Fourth day, eighth month of Keio (1868))
- Second rank (Seventh day, ninth month of Keio (1868))
- Senior second rank (1889)
- First rank (15 January 1900)

== Ancestry ==
Ancestors of Nakayama Yoshiko

16. Nakayama Naruchika (1741-1814)
8. Nakayama Tadaosa (1756-1809)
17. Imaki
4. Nakayama Tadayori (1778-1825)
18. Sanjō Saneaki (1708-1773)
9. Sanjō Narakimi (d. 1805)
19. Sanjō
2. Marquess Nakayama Tadayasu (1809-1888)
20. Ōgimachisanjō Kintsumu (1721-1777)
10. Ōgimachisanjō Sanetomo (1748-1785)
21. Sanjōnishi
5. Ōgimachisanjō Tsunako (d. 1858)
1. Lady Nakayama Yoshiko
24. Matsura Sanenobu, 8th Lord of Hirado (1712-1779)
12. Matsura Masanobu (1735-1771)
25. Miyagawa
6. Matsura Seizan, 9th Lord of Hirado (1760-1841)
13. Motai Tomoko
3. Matsura Aiko (1818-1906)
7. Kamakuma

== Bibliography ==
- Keene, Donald (2002), Emperor of Japan: Meiji and His World, 1852–1912, Columbia University Press ISBN 023112340X/ISBN 9780231123402; OCLC 46731178
