= Emperor Meiji =

Emperor of Japan from 1867 to 1912

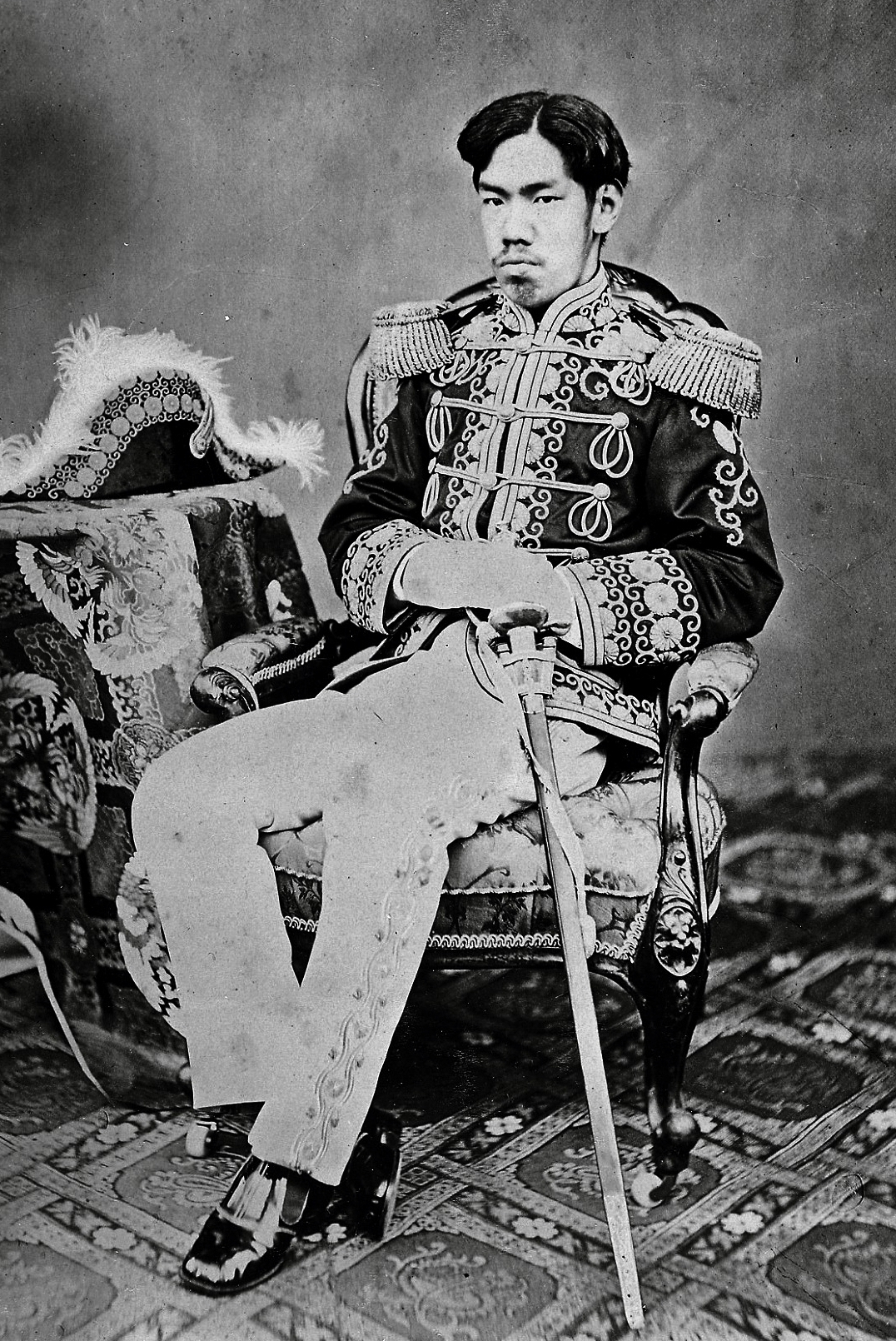
- Photograph by Uchida Kuichi, 1873

Emperor of Japan
- Reign: 30 January 1867 – 29 July 1912
- Enthronement: 13 February 1867
- Predecessor: Kōmei
- Successor: Taishō
- Shōgun: Tokugawa Yoshinobu (1866–1867)
- Born: Mutsuhito, Prince Sachi (祐宮睦仁親王); 3 November 1852; Nakayama's mansion (中山邸), Kyoto, Yamashiro, Tokugawa Shogunate, Japan
- Died: 29 July 1912 (aged 59); Meiji Palace, Tokyo, Empire of Japan
- Burial: 13 September 1912; Fushimi Momoyama no Misasagi (伏見桃山陵), Kyoto
- Spouse: Masako Ichijō (m. 1869)
- Issue among others...: Yoshihito, Emperor Taishō; Masako, Princess Takeda; Fusako, Princess Kitashirakawa; Nobuko, Princess Asaka; Toshiko, Princess Higashikuni
Era dates
- Keiō: 1 May 1865 – 23 October 1868; Meiji: 23 October 1868 – 29 July 1912
Posthumous name
- Tsuigō: Emperor Meiji (明治天皇)
- House: Imperial House of Japan
- Father: Emperor Kōmei
- Mother: Nakayama Yoshiko
- Religion: Shinto

Emperor Meiji (Note: /ˈmeɪdʒi/; Japanese: 明治, pronounced [mei.(d)ʑi]) (3 November 1852 – 29 July 1912), personal name Mutsuhito, was Emperor of Japan from 30 January 1867 until his death in 1912. The Meiji Restoration proclaimed the Empire of Japan in 1868, beginning the Meiji era. During his reign, Japan transformed from a feudal state under the Tokugawa shogunate into a major imperial power.

At the time of Mutsuhito's birth, Japan was a feudal and pre-industrial country dominated by the isolationist Tokugawa shogunate and the daimyō subject to it, who ruled over Japan's 270 decentralized domains. The opening of Japan to the West from 1854 fueled domestic demands for modernization, and when Mutsuhito became emperor after the death of his father Emperor Kōmei in 1867, it triggered the Boshin War, in which samurai (mostly from the Chōshū and Satsuma Domains) defeated the shogunate and restored power in his name.

Documents issued during his reign include the Charter Oath of 1868, Meiji Constitution of 1889, Imperial Rescript to Soldiers and Sailors of 1882, and Imperial Rescript on Education of 1890, in which he was advised by a group of oligarchs known as the genrō. Other major events which occurred during his reign include the establishment of the Cabinet in 1885, Privy Council in 1888, Imperial Diet in 1890, and military victories over China in the First Sino-Japanese War and over Russia in the Russo-Japanese War. Taiwan and Korea were annexed in 1895 and 1910, respectively. Emperor Meiji died aged 59 at Meiji Palace in Tokyo, and was succeeded by his eldest son, Yoshihito.

== Background ==
Mutsuhito's father, Emperor Kōmei

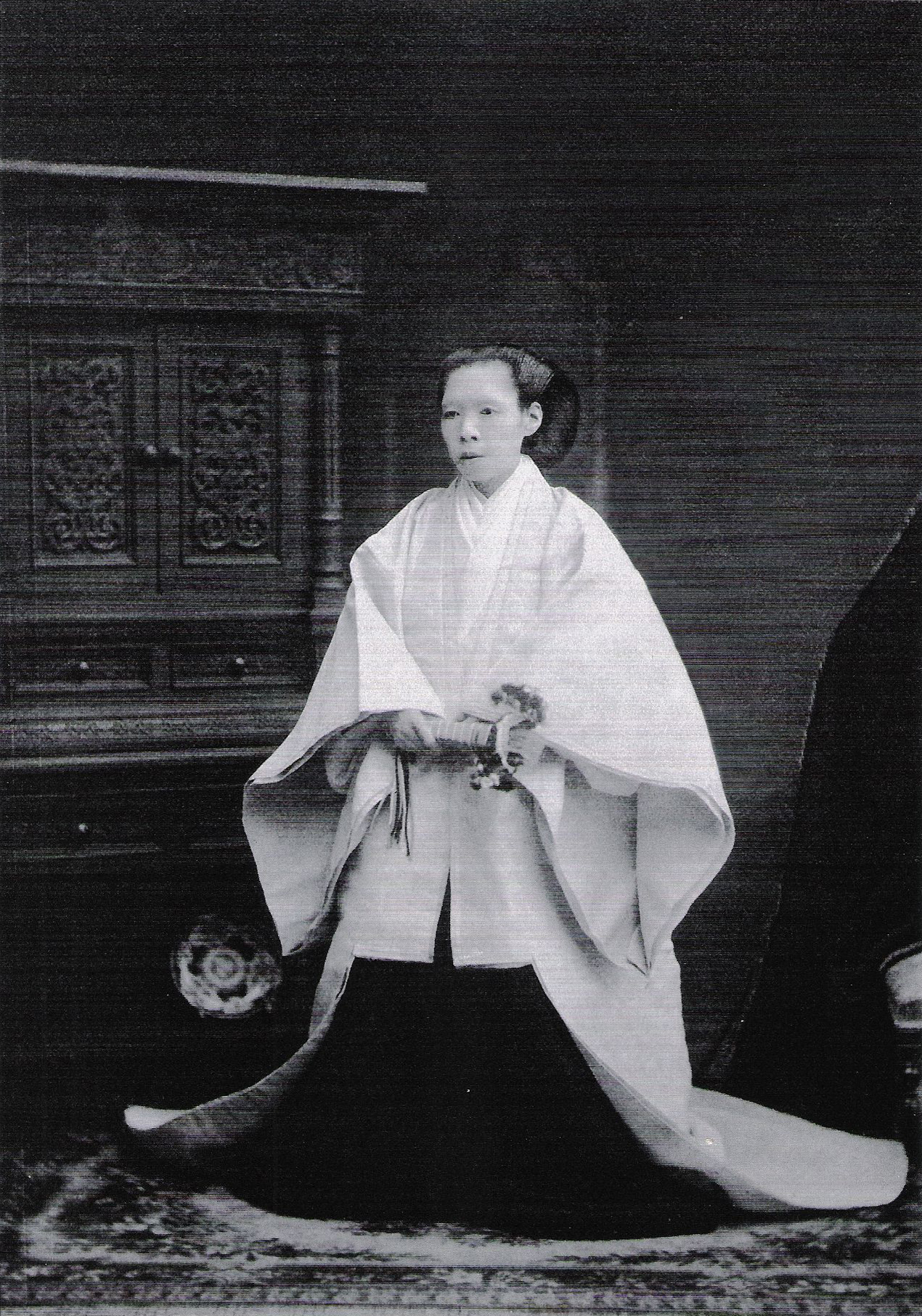
Mutsuhito's mother, Nakayama Yoshiko

The Tokugawa shogunate had established itself in the early 17th century. Under its rule, the shōgun governed Japan. About 180 lords, known as daimyōs, ruled autonomous realms under the shōgun, and occasionally the shōgun called upon the daimyōs for gifts but did not tax them. The shōgun controlled the daimyōs in other ways too; only the shōgun could approve daimyōs marriages, and the shōgun could divest a daimyō of his lands.

Tokugawa Ieyasu, who had officially retired from his position by 1605, was the first Tokugawa shōgun. Upon retirement, Tokugawa Ieyasu and his son Tokugawa Hidetada, the titular shōgun, issued a code of behavior for the nobility in 1605. Under the code, the emperor was required to devote his time to scholarship and the arts. The emperors under the shogunate appear to have adhered closely to this code by studying Confucian classics and devoting time to poetry and calligraphy. Emperors were taught only the rudiments of Japanese and Chinese history and geography. The shōgun did not seek the consent or advice of the emperor for his actions.

Emperors almost never left their palace compound, or Gosho in Kyoto, except after an emperor retired or to take shelter in a temple if the palace caught on fire. Few emperors lived long enough to retire; of the Meiji emperor's five predecessors, only his grandfather and great-grandfather lived beyond the age of 40. The Imperial Family suffered very high rates of infant mortality; all five of the emperor's brothers and sisters died as infants, and only five of his own 15 children reached adulthood.

Soon after taking control in the early seventeenth century, shogunate officials (known generically as bakufu) ended almost all Western trade with Japan, and barred Christian missionaries from the islands under the Sakoku Edict of 1635. In addition to the substantial Chinese trade, only the Dutch continued trade with Japan, maintaining a post on the island of Dejima by Nagasaki. However, by the early 19th century, European and American vessels appeared in the waters around Japan with increasing frequency.

== Early life ==
Prince Mutsuhito was born on 3 November 1852 in a small house on his maternal grandfather's property at the north end of the Gosho. At the time, birth was culturally believed to be a source of pollution, so the imperial prince was not born in the Palace. Instead, it was common for members of the Imperial Family to be born in a structure, often temporary, near the pregnant woman's father's house. The Prince Mutsuhito's mother, Nakayama Yoshiko, was a concubine (Japanese: 権の典侍, romanized: gon no tenji) to his father Emperor Kōmei, and she was the daughter of the acting major counselor, Nakayama Tadayasu. The young prince was given the title Sachi-no-miya, or Prince Sachi.

The young prince was born into an era of great change in Japan. This change was symbolized dramatically in July 1853 when Commodore Matthew C. Perry and his American Naval squadron (what the Japanese dubbed "the Black Ships"), sailed into the harbor at Edo (known since 1868 as Tokyo). Perry sought to open Japan up to international trade and showcased the modern cannons his fleet carried. For the first time in at least 250 years, the shogunate took the highly unusual step of consulting with the Imperial Court because of the crisis brought on by Perry's arrival. Emperor Kōmei's officials advised that they felt they should agree to trade with the Americans and asked that they be informed in advance of any steps to be taken upon Perry's return. The Japanese government decided that their military was no match for the American military and thus allowed trade and submitted to what it dubbed the "Unequal Treaties". "Unequal Treaties" meant giving up tariff authority and the right to try foreigners in its own courts. The shogunate's willingness to consult with the Court was short-lived: in 1858, word of a treaty arrived with a letter stating that due to shortness of time, it had not been possible to consult. Emperor Kōmei was so incensed that he threatened to abdicate—though even this action would have required the consent of the shōgun.

Much of the emperor's boyhood is known only through later accounts, which his biographer Donald Keene points out are often contradictory. One contemporary described Mutsuhito as healthy and strong, somewhat of a bully, and exceptionally talented at sumo. Another states that the prince was delicate and often ill. Some biographers state that he fainted when he first heard gunfire, while others deny this account. On 16 August 1860, Sachinomiya (Meiji's childhood name) was proclaimed prince of the blood and heir to the throne and was formally adopted by his father's consort. Later that year on 11 November, he was proclaimed as the crown prince and given an adult name, Mutsuhito. The prince began his education at the age of seven. He proved an indifferent student, and later in life wrote poems regretting that he had not applied himself more in writing practice.

== Reign ==
=== Unrest and accession ===
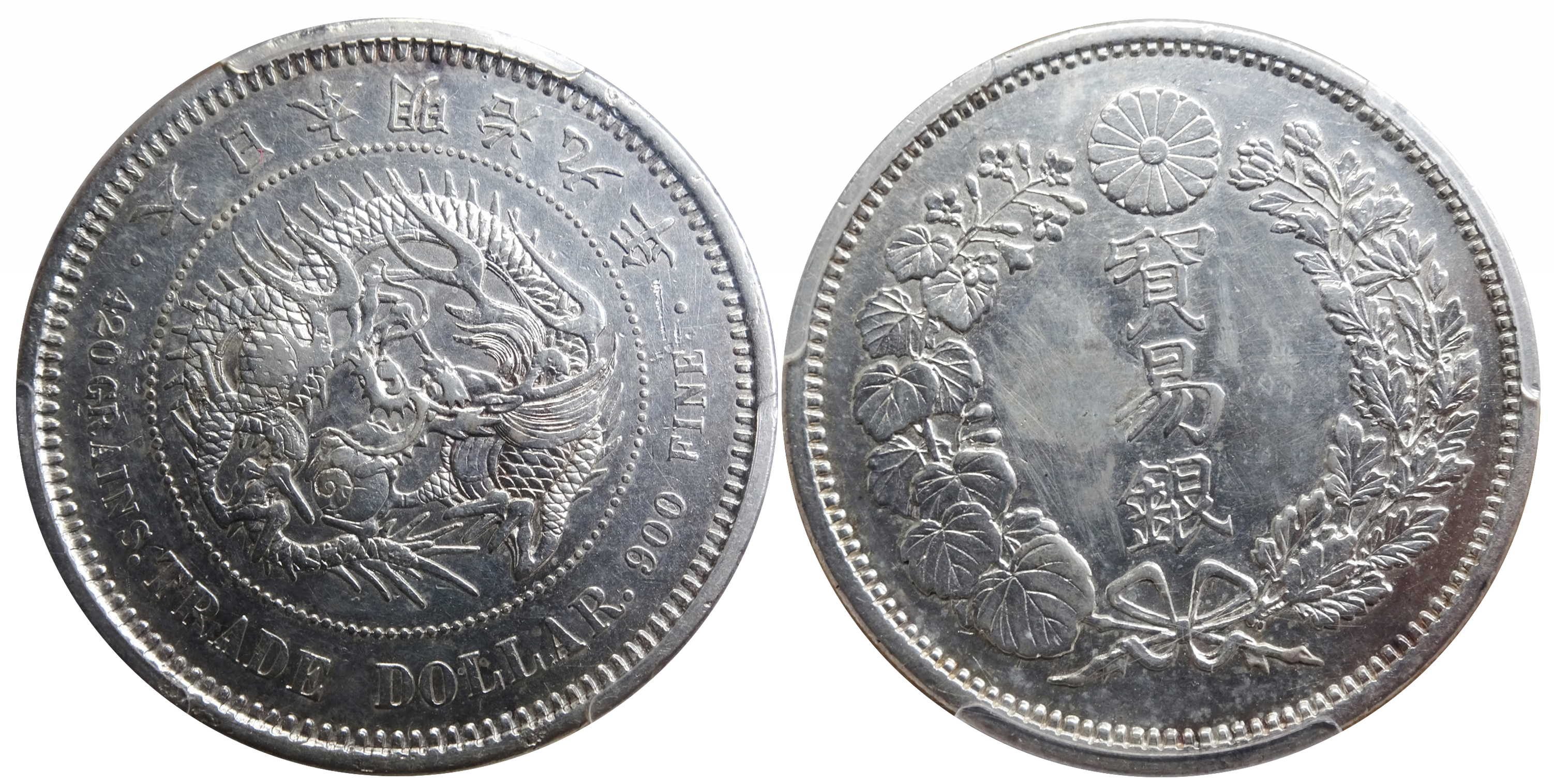
Silver coin: 1 Japanese Trade Dollar, Meiji 9 – 1876

By the early 1860s, the shogunate was under several threats. Representatives of foreign powers sought to increase their influence in Japan. Many daimyōs were increasingly dissatisfied with bakufu handling foreign affairs. Large numbers of young samurai, known as shishi or "men of high purpose", began to meet and speak against the shogunate. The shishi revered Emperor Kōmei and favored direct violent action to cure societal ills. While they initially desired the death or expulsion of all foreigners, the shishi would later begin to advocate the modernization of the country. The bakufu enacted several measures to appease the various groups in an effort to drive a wedge between the shishi and daimyōs.

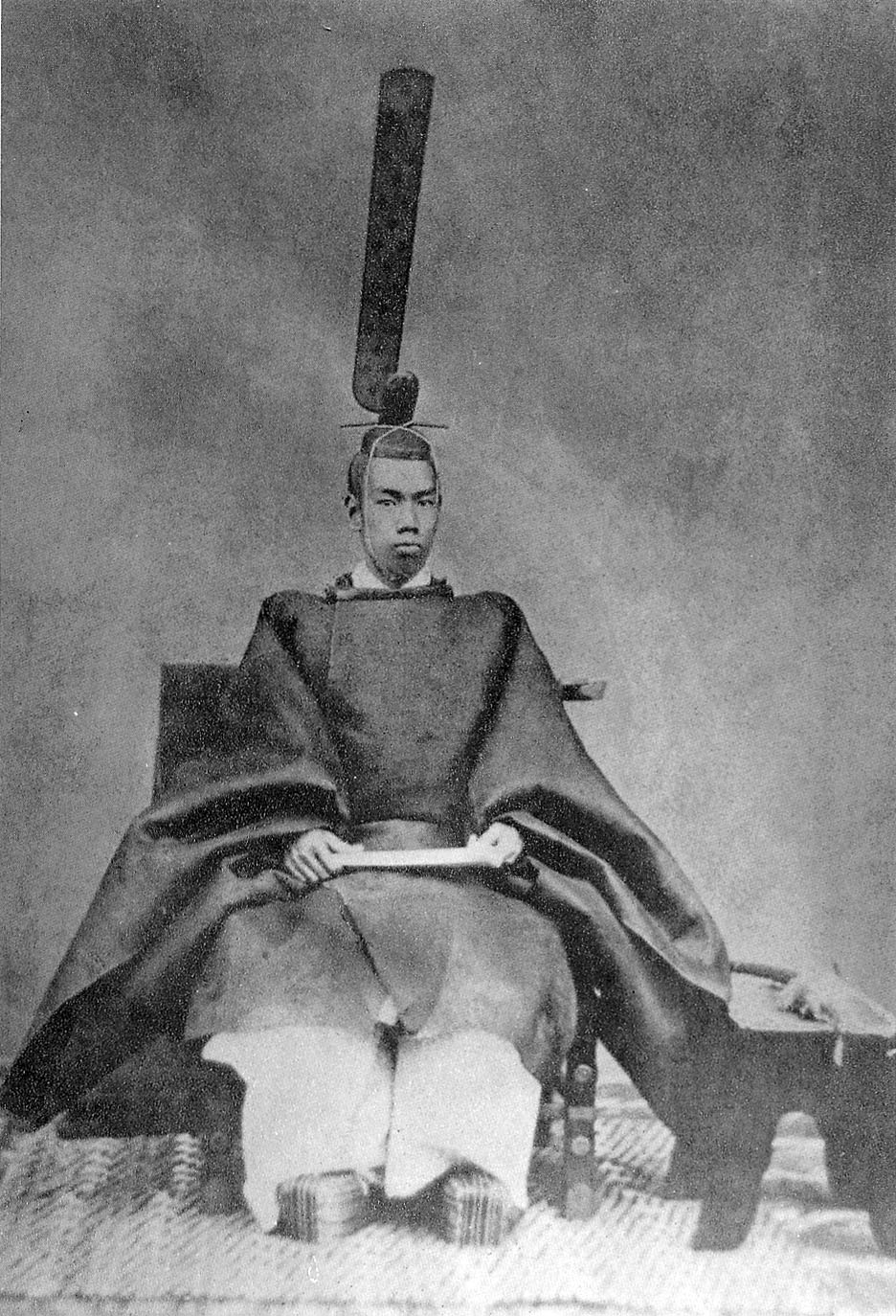
Emperor Meiji wearing the sokutai, 1872

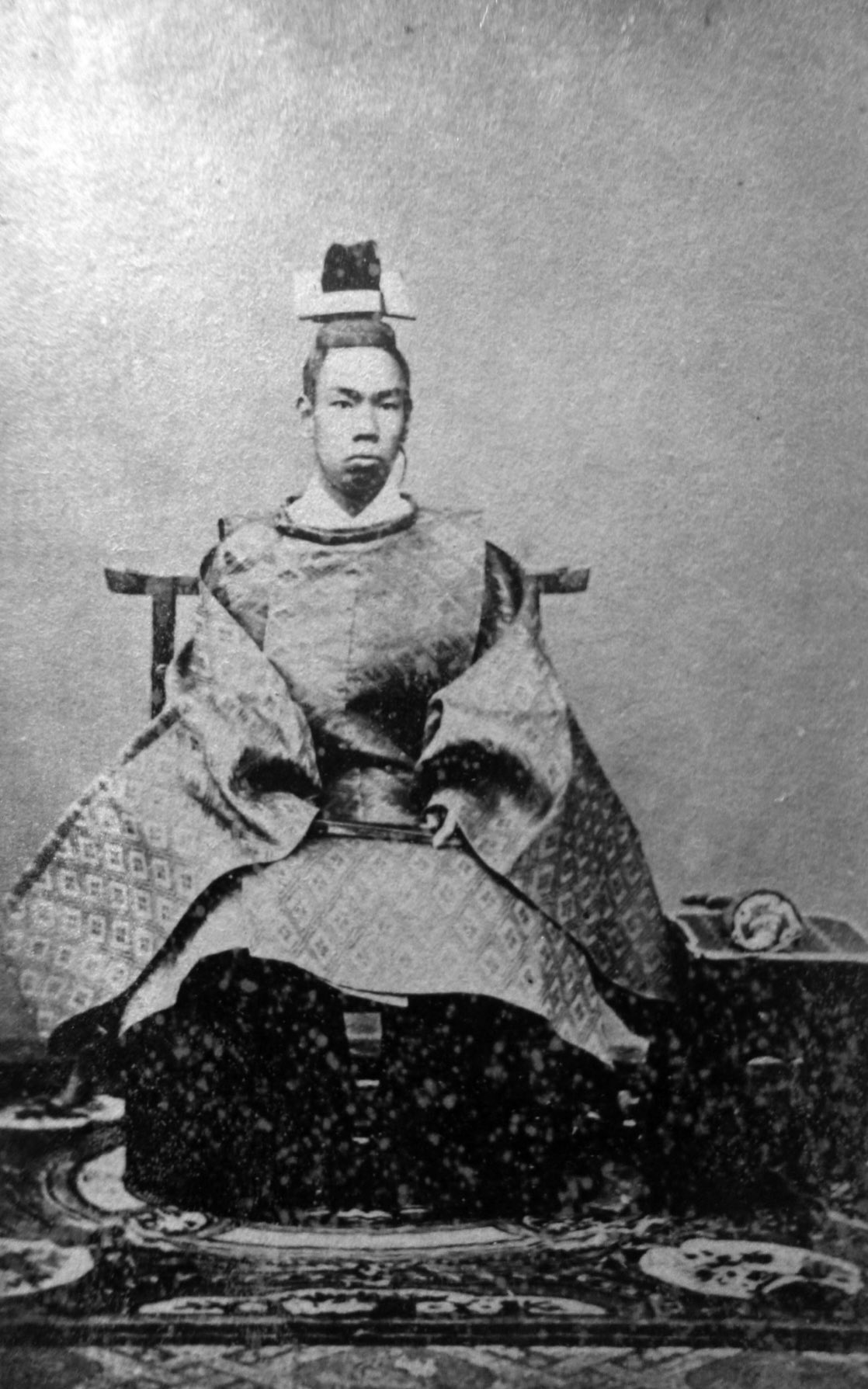
Emperor Meiji wearing konoshi (小直衣), 1872

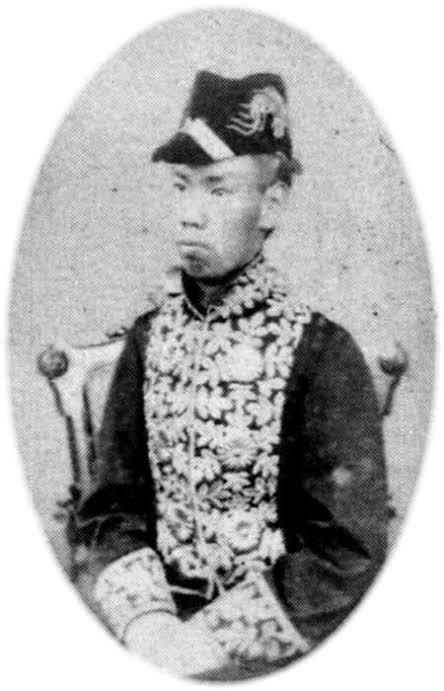
Emperor Meiji in western clothes, 1872

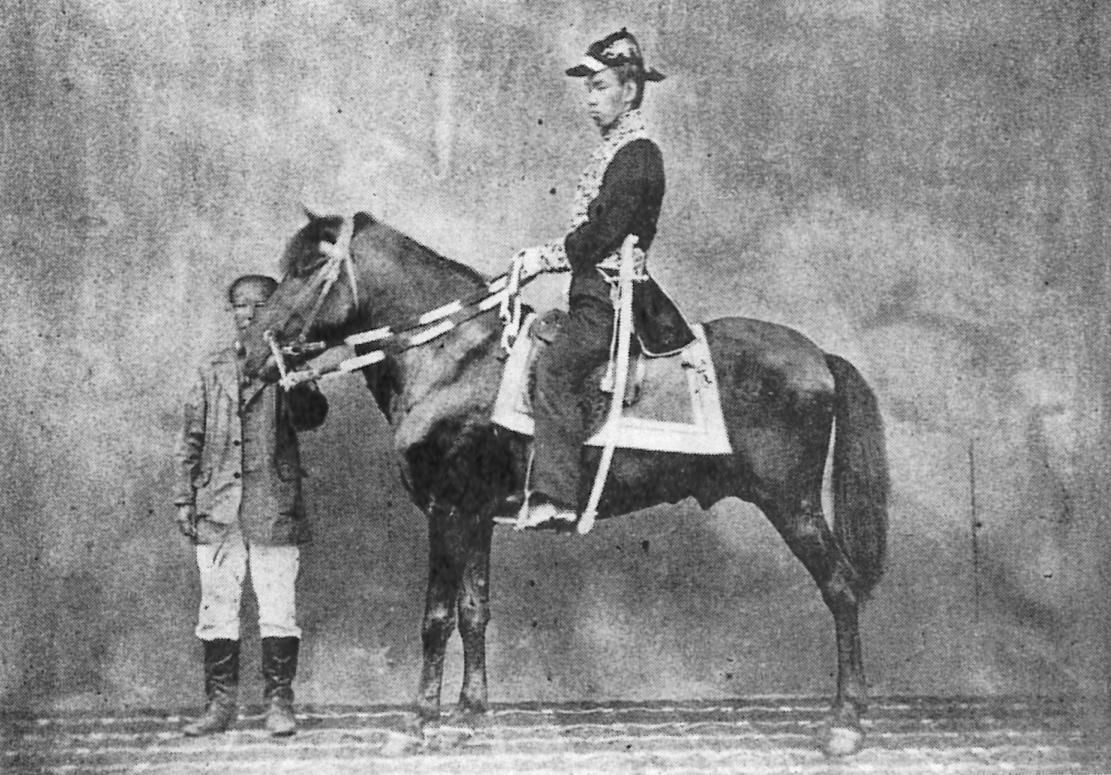
Emperor Meiji on horseback, 1872

Kyoto was a major center for the shishi and the shishi had influence over the Emperor Kōmei. In 1863, the shishi persuaded him to issue an "Order to expel barbarians". The Order placed the shogunate in a difficult position since they had no intention of enforcing the order because they did not have the power to carry it out. Several attacks were made on foreigners or their ships, and foreign forces retaliated. Bakufu forces were able to drive most of the shishi out of Kyoto, and an attempt by them to return in 1864 was driven back. Nevertheless, unrest continued throughout Japan.

The prince's awareness of the political turmoil is uncertain. During this time, he studied waka poetry, first with his father, then with the court poets. In 1866, a new shōgun, Tokugawa Yoshinobu, took office as the prince continued his classical education. Tokugawa Yoshinobu was a reformer who desired to transform Japan into a Western-style state. Yoshinobu was the final shōgun and met with resistance from among the bakufu, even as unrest and military actions continued. In mid-1866, a bakufu army set forth to punish rebels in southern Japan. The army was defeated.

Emperor Kōmei fell seriously ill at the age of 36 and died on 30 January 1867. British diplomat Sir Ernest Satow wrote, "it is impossible to deny that [Emperor Kōmei's] disappearance from the political scene, leaving as his successor a boy of fifteen or sixteen [actually fourteen], was most opportune".

In a brief ceremony in Kyoto, the crown prince formally ascended to the throne on 13 February 1867. The new emperor continued his classical education, which did not include matters of politics. In the meantime, the shōgun, Yoshinobu, struggled to maintain power. He repeatedly asked for the emperor's confirmation of his actions, which he eventually received, but there is no indication that the young emperor was himself involved in the decisions. The shishi and other rebels continued to shape their vision of the new Japan, and although they revered the emperor, they had no thought of having him play an active part in the political process.

The political struggle reached its climax in late 1867. An agreement was reached by which Yoshinobu would maintain his title and some of his power, but the lawmaking power would be vested in a bicameral legislature based on the British model. The agreement fell apart and on 9 November 1867, Yoshinobu officially tendered his resignation to the emperor and formally stepped down ten days later. The following month, the rebels marched on Kyoto, taking control of the Imperial Palace. On 4 January 1868, the emperor ceremoniously read out a document before the court proclaiming the "restoration" of Imperial rule, and the following month, documents were sent to foreign powers:

The Emperor of Japan announces to the sovereigns of all foreign countries and to their subjects that permission has been granted to the shōgun Tokugawa Yoshinobu to return the governing power in accordance with his own request. We shall henceforward exercise supreme authority in all the internal and external affairs of the country. Consequently, the title of Emperor must be substituted for that of Tycoon, in which the treaties have been made. Officers are being appointed by us to the conduct of foreign affairs. It is desirable that the representatives of the treaty powers recognize this announcement.

— Mutsuhito

On 23 October 1868 the era was changed from Keiō to Meiji ('enlightened rule'), which was later used for the emperor's posthumous name. This marked the beginning of the custom of posthumously naming the emperor after the era during which he ruled.

In a conflict known as the Boshin War, Yoshinobu's followers briefly resisted and bakufu holdouts were finally defeated in late 1869.

=== Consolidation of power ===
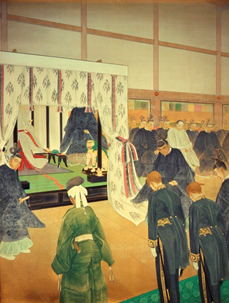
Emperor Meiji receives Dutch Minister-Resident Dirk de Graeff van Polsbroek in 1868

Despite the ouster of the bakufu, no effective central government had been put in place by the rebels. On 23 March the Dutch Minister-Resident Dirk de Graeff van Polsbroek and the French Minister-Resident Léon Roches were the first European envoys ever to receive a personal audience with the new Emperor Meiji in Edo (Tokyo). This audience laid the foundation for (modern) Dutch diplomacy in Japan. Subsequently, De Graeff van Polsbroek assisted the emperor and the government in their negotiations with representatives of the major European powers. On 7 April 1868, the emperor was presented with the Charter Oath, a five-point statement of the nature of the new government. The statement was designed to win over those who had not yet committed themselves to the new regime. This document, which the emperor then formally promoted, abolished feudalism and proclaimed a modern democratic government for Japan. The Charter Oath would later be cited by Emperor Shōwa in the Humanity Declaration as support for the imposed changes in Japanese government following World War II. For the first time since early childhood, the emperor left the Imperial precincts in Kyoto in mid-May to take command of the forces pursuing the remnants of the bakufu armies. Traveling in slow stages due to through roads being lined with crowds, he took three days to travel from Kyoto to Osaka. There was no conflict in Osaka; the new leaders wanted the emperor to be more visible to his people and to foreign envoys. At the end of May, after two weeks in Osaka (in a much less formal atmosphere than in Kyoto), the emperor returned to his home. Shortly after his return, the emperor began to preside over all state business, reserving further literary study for his leisure time. Only from 1871 onward did the emperor's studies include materials on contemporary affairs.

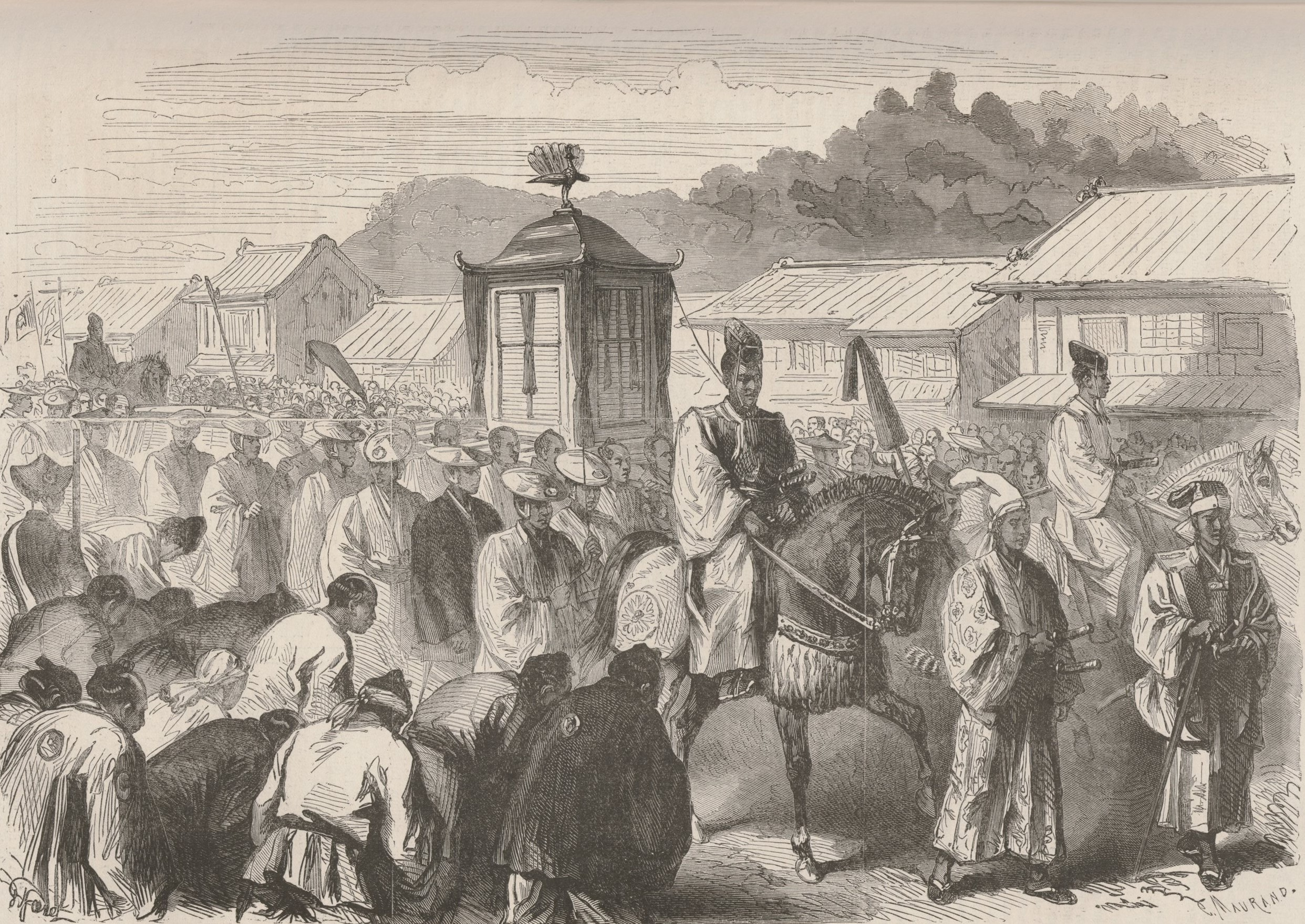
The sixteen-year-old emperor, traveling from Kyoto to Tokyo at the end of 1868

On 19 September 1868, Mutsuhito changed the name of the city of Edo to Tokyo, meaning "eastern capital". He was formally crowned in Kyoto on 15 October (a ceremony which had been postponed from the previous year due to the civil unrest). Shortly before the coronation, he introduced a new nengō (era) called Meiji ("enlightened rule"). Heretofore the nengō had often been changed multiple times in an emperor's reign; from now on there would only be one nengō per reign.

Soon after his coronation, the emperor journeyed to Tokyo by road, visiting it for the first time. He arrived in late November and began an extended stay by distributing sake among the population. The population of Tokyo was eager for an Imperial visit. Tokyo had been the site of the shōgun's court and the city's population feared that with the abolition of the shogunate, the city might fall into decline. It would not be until 1889 that a final decision was made to move the capital to Tokyo. While in Tokyo, the emperor boarded a Japanese naval vessel for the first time, and the following day gave instructions for studies to see how Japan's navy could be strengthened. Soon after his return to Kyoto, a rescript was issued in the emperor's name (but most likely written by court officials). It indicated his intent to be involved in government affairs. And indeed he attended cabinet meetings and innumerable other government functions, though rarely speaking, almost until the day of his death.

=== Political reform ===
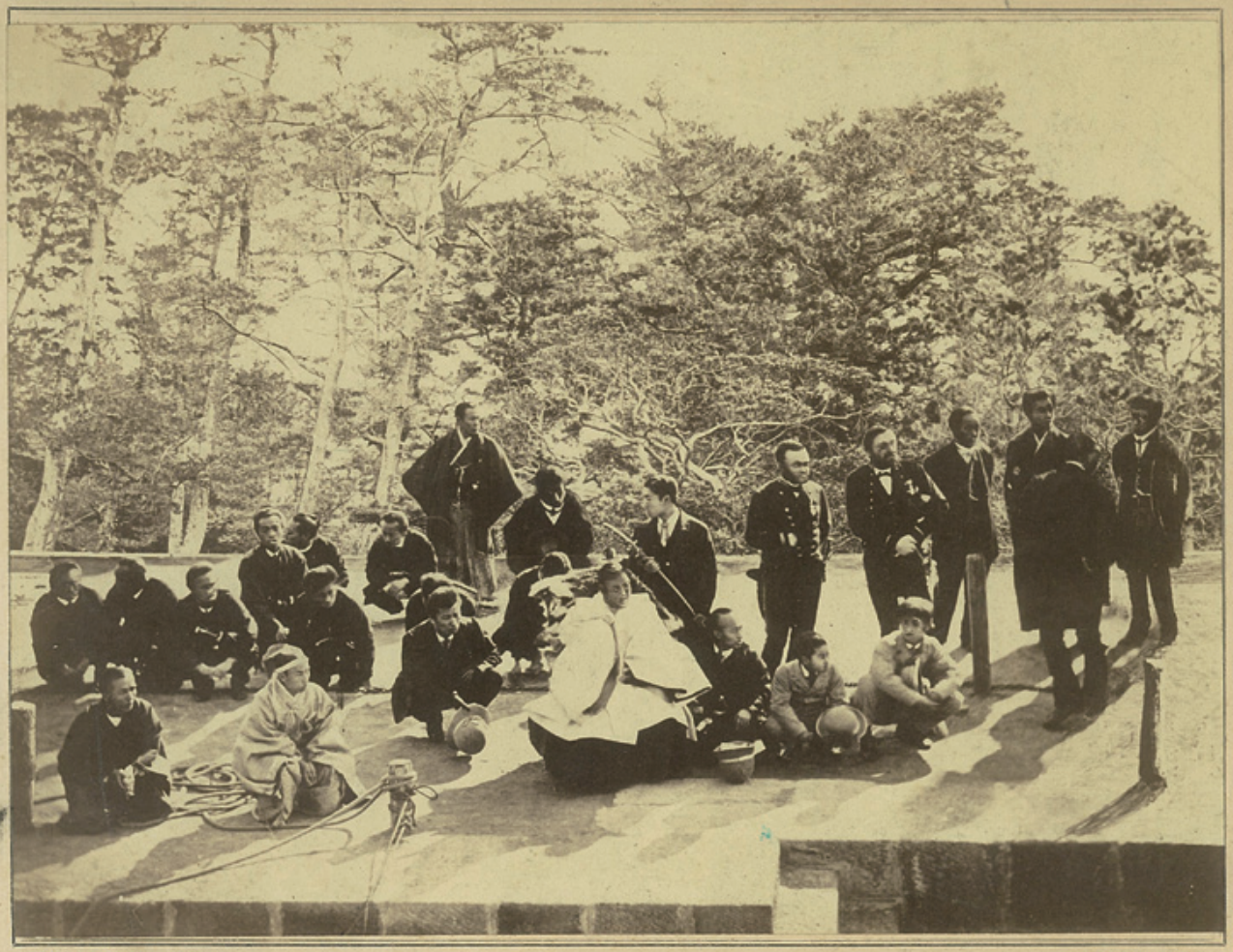
First-ever photograph of Emperor Meiji at the Yokosuka Naval Arsenal by Baron Raimund von Stillfried on 1 January 1872

The successful revolutionaries organized themselves into a Council of State, and subsequently into a system where three main ministers led the government. This structure would last until the establishment of a prime minister, who would lead a cabinet in a western fashion, in 1885. Initially, not even the retention of the emperor was certain; revolutionary leader Gotō Shōjirō later stated that some officials "were afraid the extremists might go further and abolish the Mikado". Japan's new leaders sought to reform the patchwork system of domains governed by the daimyōs. In 1869, several of the daimyōs who had supported the revolution gave their land property to the emperor and were reappointed as governors, with considerable salaries. By the following year, all other daimyōs had followed suit.

In 1871, as Japan was organized into 72 prefectures, the emperor abolished domains entirely. The daimyōs were compensated with annual salaries equal to ten percent of their former revenues (from which they now did not have to deduct the cost of governing), but were required to move to the new capital, Tokyo. Most daimyōs retired from politics.

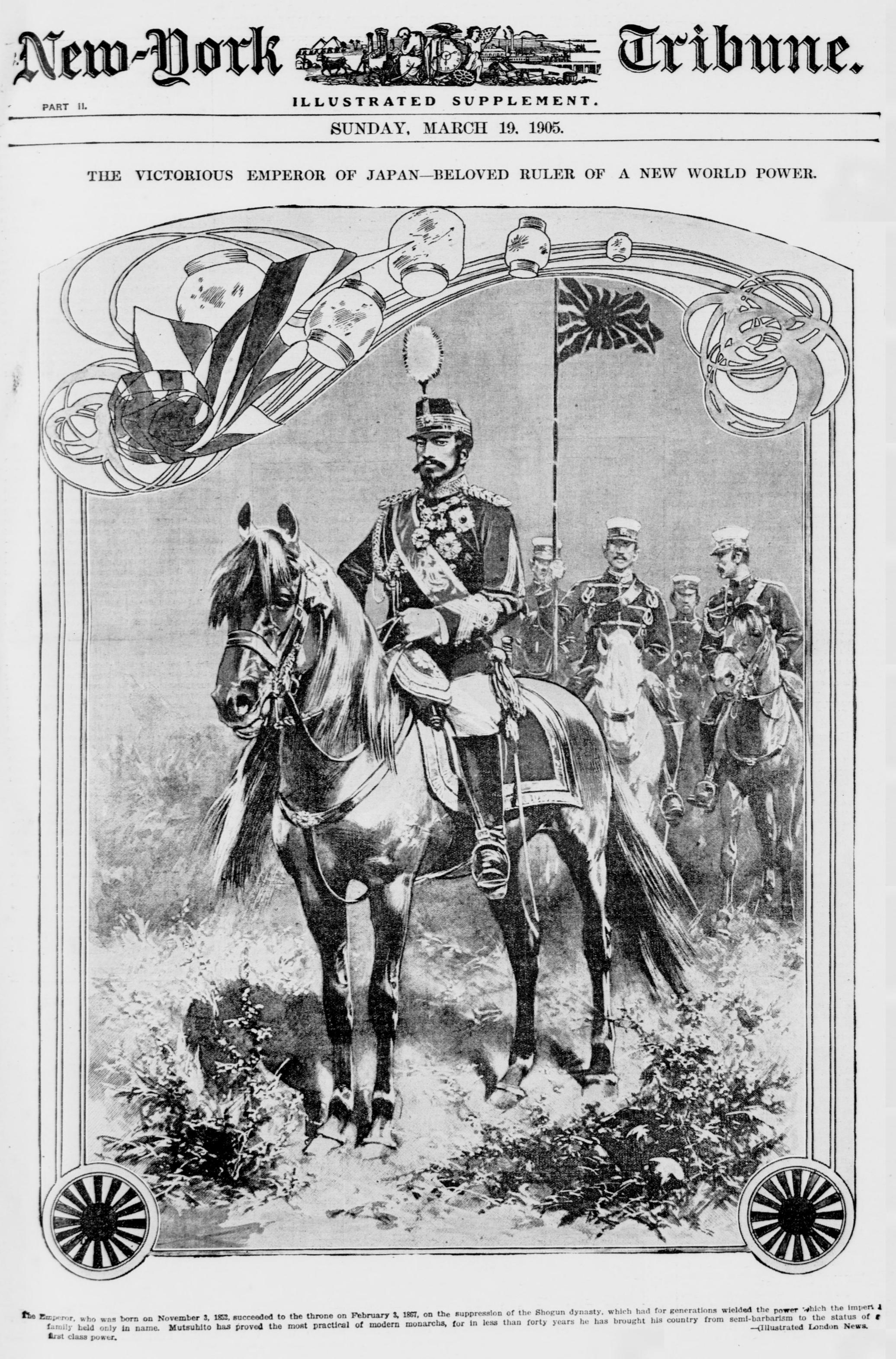
Illustration of Emperor Meiji by The Illustrated London News, published in the New-York Tribune (1905)

The new administration gradually abolished most privileges of the samurai, including their right to a stipend from the government. However, unlike the daimyōs, many samurai suffered financially from this change. Most other class-based distinctions were abolished. Legalized discrimination against the burakumin ended. However, these classes continue to suffer discrimination in Japan to the present time.

The 1889 constitution created a new parliament, although it had no real power. Power had passed from the Tokugawa into the hands of those daimyōs and other samurai who had led the Restoration. Japan was thus controlled by the Genrō, an oligarchy which comprised the most powerful men of the military, political and economic spheres. The emperor showed greater political longevity than his recent predecessors, as he was the first Japanese monarch to remain on the throne past the age of 50 since Emperor Ōgimachi's abdication from the throne in 1586.

The Japanese take pride in the Meiji Restoration, as it and the accompanying industrialization allowed Japan to become the preeminent power in the Pacific and a major player in the world within a generation. However, Emperor Meiji's role in the Restoration, as well as the amount of personal authority and influence he wielded during his reign, remains debatable. He kept no diary, wrote almost no letters (unlike his father) and left "no more than three or four" photographs. The accounts of people who had met or were close to him usually contain little substantial information or are mutually contradictory.

Due to the lack of reliable sources of the period, mysteries surrounding Emperor Meiji's personality and role in the Restoration remain a matter of historical dispute. James C. Baxter argues that the emperor was a figurehead without real power who rarely interfered with what had been agreed upon in advance by the Meiji oligarchy. Conversely, Herbert Bix describes Meiji as a powerful autocrat whom the Genrō struggled to restrain while accommodating his anti-democratic inclinations. Roy Starrs characterizes Meiji as a highly individualistic and forthright person who was no puppet to any group in his government, and although progressive, not 'liberal' or 'democratic'. Yet another group of historians contend he was never a full dictator, but remain divided on whether his personal power was "far closer to the absolutist end". or he merely played a mediating role in the Genrō's decision making.

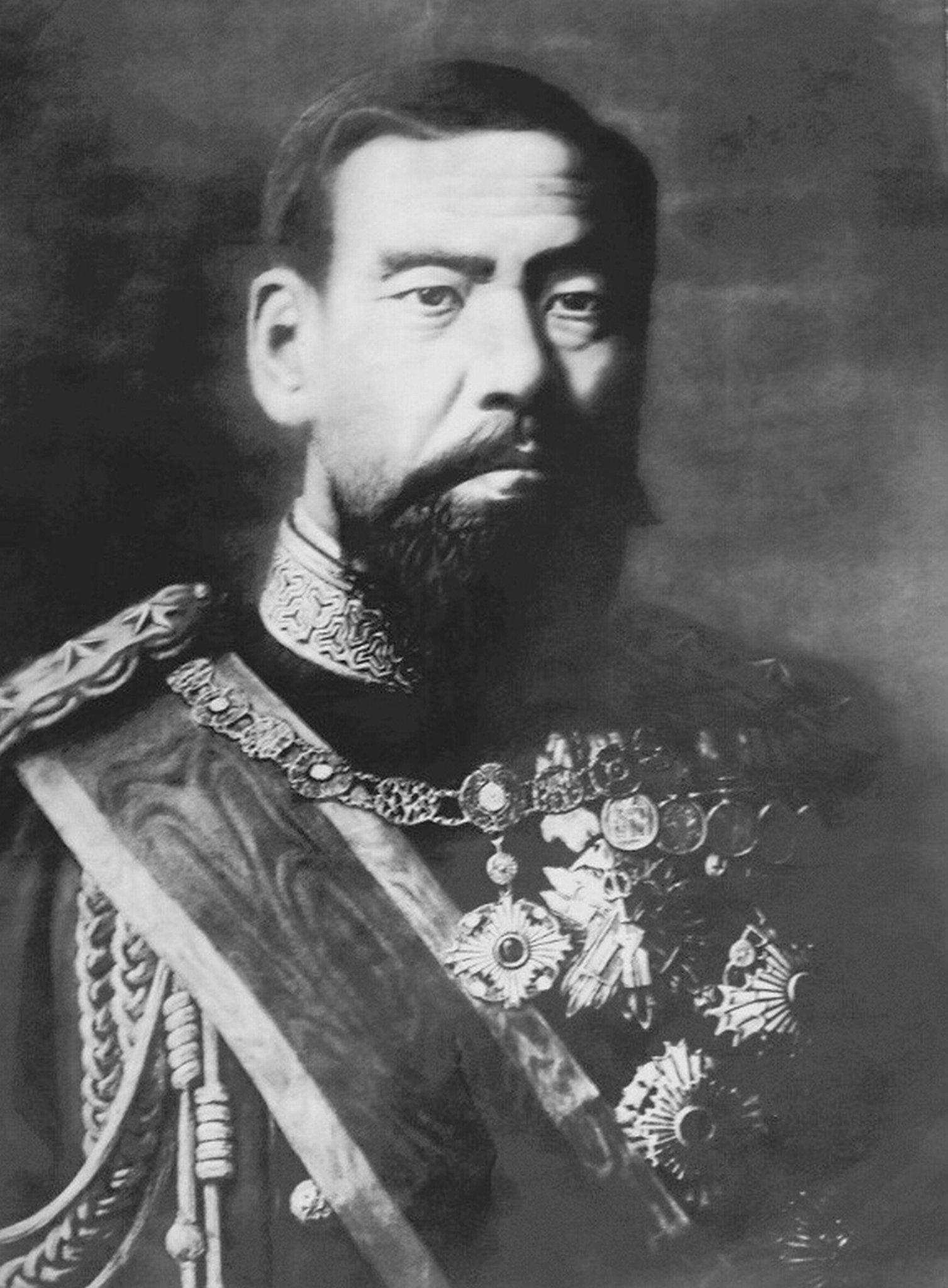
Emperor Meiji in later life. Emperor Meiji grew a large beard in his later years, which he became well-known for.

He composed the following poem in waka form:

よもの海
みなはらからと思ふ世に：
など、波風のたちさわぐらむ？

Yomo no umi
mina harakara to
omofu yo ni:
nado, namikaze no
tachi sawaguramu?

The seas of the four directions—
all are born of one womb:
why, then, do the wind and waves rise in discord?

This poem was later recited by his grandson, Emperor Shōwa in an Imperial Conference in September 1941 before the attack on Pearl Harbor to tell that he wanted to avoid the war.

The Illustrated London News published an article with a cover illustration of Emperor Meiji in the New-York Tribune on 19 March 1905. The description text said:

The victorious Emperor of Japan - beloved ruler of a new world power. The Emperor, who was born on 3 November 1852, succeeded to the throne on 3 February 1867, on the suppression of the Shogun dynasty, which had for generations wielded the power which the imperial family held only in name. Mutsuhito has proved the most practical of modern monarchs, for in less than forty years he has brought his country from semi-barbarism to the status of a first class power.

=== Senior life and death ===
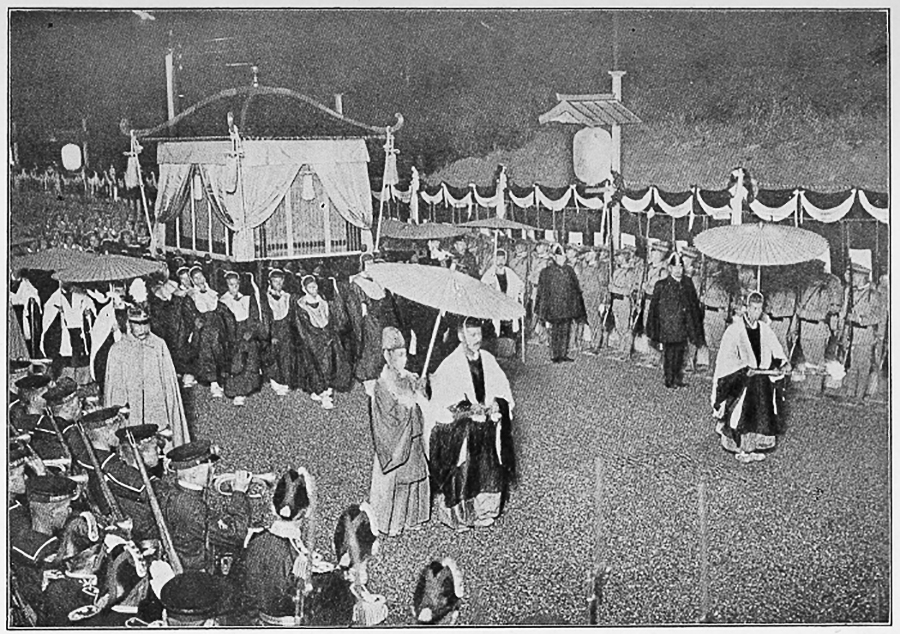
State funeral of Emperor Meiji

Portrait of Emperor in yellow Sokutai.

Near the end of his life several leftists, including Shūsui Kōtoku, were executed (1911) on charges of having conspired to murder the sovereign. This conspiracy was known as the High Treason Incident (1910).

Emperor Meiji, suffering from diabetes, nephritis, and gastroenteritis, died of uremia at 10:40 pm on 29 July 1912, aged 59. His eldest son, Crown Prince Yoshihito succeeded immediately as 123rd monarch (Emperor Taishō).

Emperor Meiji's state funeral was held at the Imperial Japanese Army's Aoyama Drill Court (present-day; Meiji Shrine Outer Garden) on 13 September, marking the first time a emperor's funeral service had been held at Tokyo.

By 1912, Japan had gone through a political, economic, and social revolution and emerged as one of the great powers in the world. The New York Times summed up this transformation at the emperor's funeral in 1912 as: "the contrast between that which preceded the funeral car and that which followed it was striking indeed. Before it went old Japan; after it came new Japan."

After the emperor's death in 1912, the Imperial Diet passed a resolution to commemorate his role in the Meiji Restoration. An iris garden in an area of Tokyo where Emperor Meiji and the Empress had been known to visit was chosen as the building's location for the Shinto shrine Meiji Jingū. The shrine does not contain the emperor's grave, which is at Fushimi-Momoyama Castle, located in Fushimi-ku, Kyoto.

== Family and issue ==
Soon after Meiji's ascension, the emperor's officials presented Ichijō Haruko to him as a possible bride. The future Empress was the daughter of an Imperial official, and was three years older than the groom, who would have to wait to wed until after his genpuku (manhood ceremony). The two married on 11 January 1869. Known posthumously as Empress Dowager Shōken, she was the first Imperial Consort in several centuries to receive the title of kōgō (literally, "emperor's wife", translated as Empress Consort). Although she was the first Japanese Empress Consort to play a public role, she bore no children. However, the Meiji Emperor had fifteen children by five official ladies-in-waiting. Only five of his children, a prince born to Lady Naruko (1855–1943), the daughter of Yanagiwara Mitsunaru, and four princesses born to Lady Sachiko (1867–1947), the eldest daughter of Count Sono Motosachi, lived to adulthood. Although Meiji was the last emperor to have concubines, this function was not officially abolished until 1924.

=== Spouse ===
Image	Position	Name	Birth	Death	Father	Issue
	Empress	Ichijō Haruko (一条美子) later Empress Dowager Shōken (昭憲皇太后)	9 May 1849	9 April 1914	Tadaka Ichijō	None

=== Concubines ===
Image	Name	Birth	Death	Father	Issue
—N/a	Hamuro Mitsuko (葉室光子)	3 February 1853	22 September 1873	Gon-Dainagon: Hamuro Nagamasa	• First Prince: Wakamitsuteru-hiko no Mikoto
	Hashimoto Natsuko (橋本夏子)	19 March 1856	14 November 1873	• Shōnagon: Higashibojo Natsunaga • Dainagon: Hashimoto Saneakira (maternal grandfather and foster father)	• First Princess: Wakatakayori-hime no Mikoto
	Yanagiwara Naruko (柳原愛子)	26 June 1859	16 October 1943	Gon-Chunagon: Yanagihara Mitsunaru	• Second Princess: Imperial Princess Ume-no-Miya Shigeko • Second Prince: Imperial Prince Take-no-Miya Yukihito • Third Prince: Imperial Prince Haru-no-Miya Yoshihito (later Emperor Taisho)
—N/a	Chigusa Kotoko (千種任子)	19 July 1855	1 February 1944	Sakon'e gon no shōshō : Chigusa Aritō	• Third Princess: Imperial Princess Shige-no-Miya Akiko • Fourth Princess: Imperial Princess Masu-no-Miya Fumiko
	Sono Sachiko (園祥子)	23 December 1867	7 July 1947	Ukon'e no gon no chūjō: Sono Motosachi	• Fifth Princess: Imperial Princess Hisa-no-Miya Shizuko • Fourth Prince: Imperial Prince Aki-no-Miya Michihito • Sixth Princess: Imperial Princess Tsune-no-miya Masako • Seventh Princess: Imperial Princess Kane-no-miya Fusako • Eighth Princess: Imperial Princess Fumi-no-miya Nobuko • Fifth Prince: Imperial Prince Mitsu-no-miya Teruhito • Ninth Princess: Imperial Princess Yasu-no-miya Toshiko • Tenth Princess: Imperial Princess Sada-no-miya Tokiko

=== Issue ===
Emperor Meiji had thirteen children (four of them were sons and nine were daughters), five of them (a son and four daughters) reached adulthood.

He had eighteen grandchildren (eleven grandsons and seven granddaughters).

Image	Status	Name	Birth	Death	Mother	Marriage		Issue
—N/a	(Male stillborn)		18 September 1873	18 September 1873	Hamuro Mitsuko	—N/a	—N/a	—N/a
—N/a	(Female stillborn)		13 November 1873	13 November 1873	Hashimoto Natsuko	—N/a	—N/a	—N/a
—N/a	First Princess	Ume-no-Miya Shigeko (梅宮薫子内親王)	25 January 1875	8 June 1876	Yanagiwara Naruko	—N/a	—N/a	—N/a
—N/a	First Prince	Take-no-Miya Yukihito (建宮敬仁親王)	23 September 1877	26 July 1878	Yanagiwara Naruko	—N/a	—N/a	—N/a
	Second Prince	Haru-no-Miya Yoshihito (明宮嘉仁親王) (later Emperor Taishō)	31 August 1879	25 December 1926	Yanagiwara Naruko	10 May 1900	Sadako Kujō	• Hirohito, Emperor Shōwa • Yasuhito, Prince Chichibu • Nobuhito, Prince Takamatsu • Takahito, Prince Mikasa
—N/a	Second Princess	Shige-no-Miya Akiko (滋宮韶子内親王)	3 August 1881	6 September 1883	Chigusa Kotoko	—N/a	—N/a	—N/a
—N/a	Third Princess	Masu-no-Miya Fumiko (増宮章子内親王)	26 January 1883	8 September 1883	Chigusa Kotoko	—N/a	—N/a	—N/a
—N/a	Fourth Princess	Hisa-no-Miya Shizuko (久宮静子内親王)	10 February 1886	4 April 1887	Sono Sachiko	—N/a	—N/a	—N/a
—N/a	Third Prince	Aki-no-Miya Michihito (昭宮猷仁親王)	22 August 1887	12 November 1888	Sono Sachiko	—N/a	—N/a	—N/a
	Fifth Princess	Tsune-no-miya Masako (常宮昌子内親王)	30 September 1888	8 March 1940	Sono Sachiko	30 April 1908	Prince Tsunehisa Takeda	• Prince Tsuneyoshi Takeda • Princess Ayako Takeda
	Sixth Princess	Kane-no-miya Fusako (周宮房子内親王)	28 January 1890	11 August 1974	Sono Sachiko	29 April 1909	Prince Naruhisa Kitashirakawa	• Prince Nagahisa Kitashirakawa • Princess Mineko Kitashirakawa • Princess Sawako Kitashirakawa • Princess Taeko Kitashirakawa
	Seventh Princess	Fumi-no-miya Nobuko (富美宮允子内親王)	7 August 1891	3 November 1933	Sono Sachiko	6 May 1909	Prince Yasuhiko Asaka	• Princess Kikuko Asaka • Princess Takahiko Asaka • Prince Tadahito Asaka • Princess Kiyoko Asaka
—N/a	Fourth Prince	Mitsu-no-miya Teruhito (満宮輝仁親王)	30 November 1893	17 August 1894	Sono Sachiko	—N/a	—N/a	—N/a
	Eighth Princess	Yasu-no-miya Toshiko (泰宮聡子内親王)	11 May 1896	5 March 1978	Sono Sachiko	18 May 1915	Prince Naruhiko Higashikuni	• Prince Morihiro Higashikuni • Prince Moromasa Higashikuni • Prince Akitsune Higashikuni • Prince Toshihiko Higashikuni
—N/a	Ninth Princess	Sada-no-miya Tokiko (貞宮多喜子内親王)	24 September 1897	11 January 1899	Sono Sachiko	—N/a	—N/a	—N/a

== Honours ==
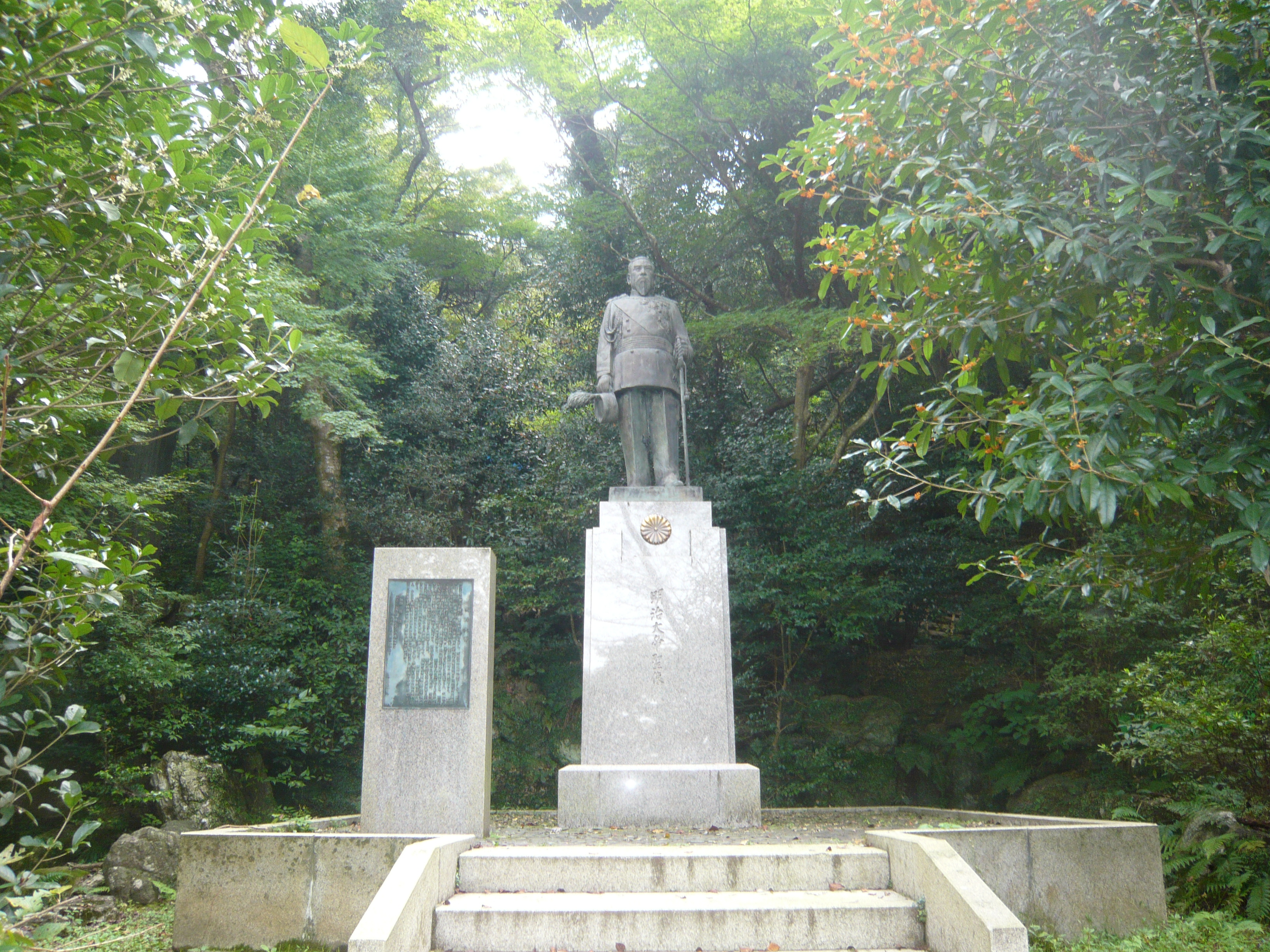
A bronze statue of Emperor Meiji

=== National honours ===
- Founder and Sovereign of the Order of the Rising Sun, 10 April 1875
- Founder and Sovereign of the Order of the Chrysanthemum, 27 December 1876
- Founder and Sovereign of the Order of Meiji, 4 January 1888
- Founder and Sovereign of the Order of the Paulownia Flowers, 4 January 1888
- Founder and Sovereign of the Order of the Precious Crown, 4 January 1888
- Founder and Sovereign of the Order of the Golden Kite, 12 February 1890

=== Foreign honours ===
He received the following orders and decorations:

- (Austrian Empire) (Kingdom of Hungary) Austria-Hungary: Grand Cross of the Royal Hungarian Order of St. Stephen, 16 May 1881
- Belgium: Grand Cordon of the Order of Leopold, 20 November 1880
- Denmark: Knight of the Order of the Elephant, 18 May 1887
- French Third Republic: Grand Cross of the National Order of the Legion of Honour, 20 March 1883
- German Empire: Knight of the Order of the Black Eagle, 29 May 1879; with Collar, 10 June 1895
  - Kingdom of Bavaria: Knight of the Royal Order of St. Hubert, 1894
  - Brunswick: Grand Cross of the Order of Henry the Lion, 18 June 1907
  - (Saxe-Coburg and Gotha) (Duchy of Saxe-Altenburg) (Saxe-Meiningen) Ernestine duchies: Grand Cross of the Saxe-Ernestine House Order, 1873
  - Mecklenburg: Grand Cross of the House Order of the Wendish Crown, with Crown in Ore and Collar, 2 February 1885
  - Saxe-Weimar-Eisenach: Grand Cross of the Order of the White Falcon, 27 December 1882
  - Württemberg: Grand Cross of the Order of the Württemberg Crown, 23 December 1896
- Kingdom of Greece: Knight Grand Cross of the Order of the Redeemer, 13 May 1891
- Kingdom of Hawaii: Knight Grand Cross with Collar of the Order of Kamehameha I, 15 March 1881
- Kingdom of Italy:
  - Knight of the Supreme Order of the Most Holy Annunciation, 26 July 1879
  - Knight Grand Cross of the Order of Saints Maurice and Lazarus, 26 July 1879
  - Knight Grand Cross of the Order of the Crown of Italy, 26 July 1879
- Korean Empire: Recipient of the Order of the Golden Ruler, 5 September 1900
- Principality of Montenegro: Grand Cross of the Order of Prince Danilo I, 18 February 1885
- Netherlands: Knight Grand Cross of the Order of the Netherlands Lion, 26 July 1881
- Ottoman Empire: Recipient of the Order of Distinction, 13 June 1890
- Kingdom of Portugal: Grand Cross of the Sash of the Three Orders, 16 April 1904
- Qing dynasty: Member 1st Class, 1st Grade of the Order of the Double Dragon, 20 December 1898
- Russian Empire: Knight of the Order of Saint Andrew the Apostle the First-called, 5 September 1879
- Restoration (Spain): Knight of the Order of the Golden Fleece, 14 November 1883
- Siam: Knight of the Order of the Royal House of Chakri, 22 December 1887
- Sweden-Norway: Knight of the Royal Order of the Seraphim, 11 December 1881
- United Kingdom of Great Britain and Ireland: Stranger Knight Companion of the Most Noble Order of the Garter, 15 May 1906

== Timeline and gallery ==
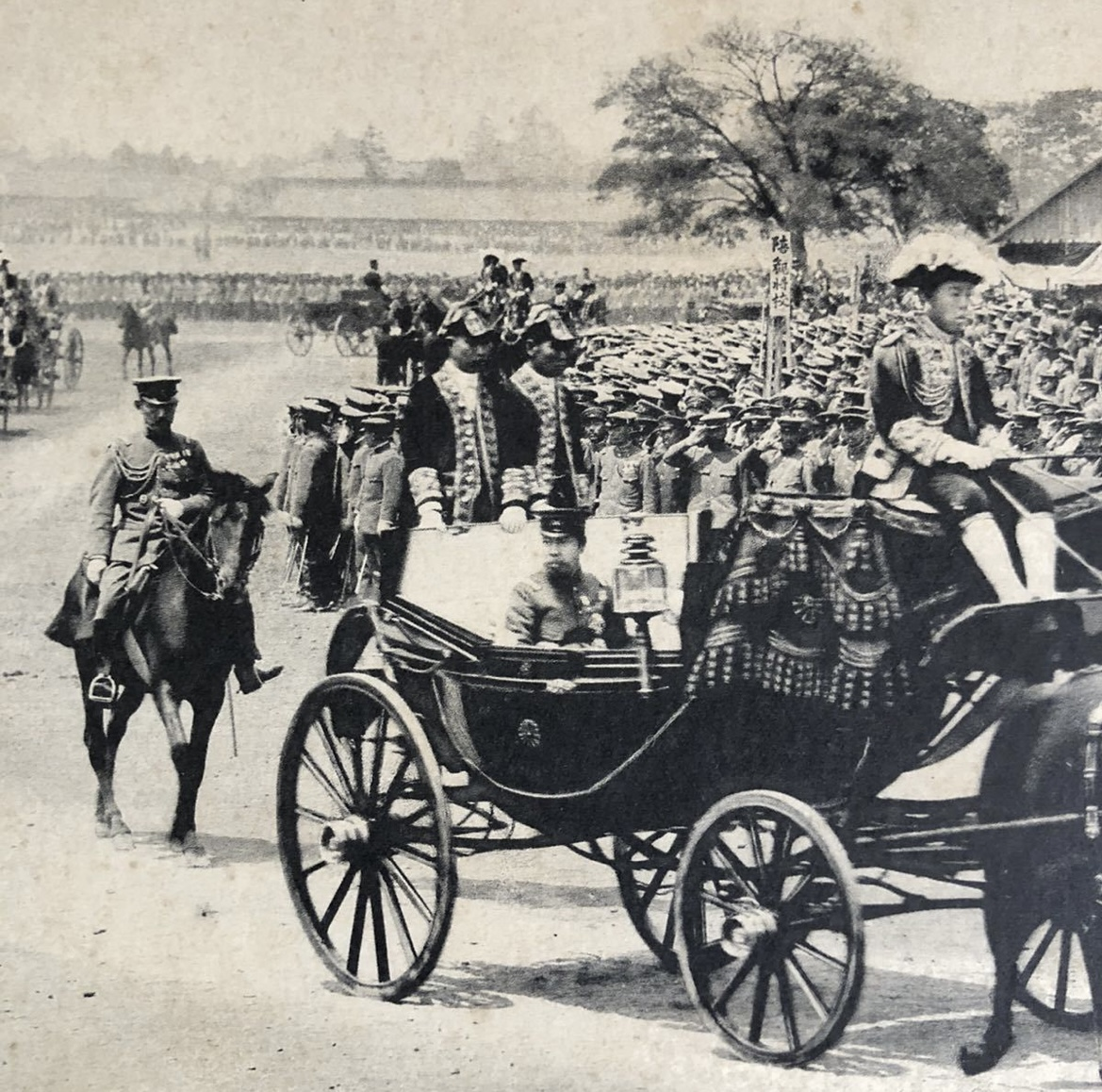
Emperor Meiji reviewing the military at the Russo-Japanese War victory parade held on 30 April 1906, in Tokyo

The Meiji era ushered in many far-reaching changes to the ancient feudal society of Japan. A timeline of major events might include:

- 3 November 1852: Emperor Meiji (then known as the Prince Mutsuhito Sachinomiya) is born to the imperial concubine Nakayama Yoshiko and Emperor Kōmei.
- 1853: A fleet of ships headed by Commodore Matthew Perry arrives in Japan on 8 July. Death of the shōgun Tokugawa Ieyoshi; appointment of Tokugawa Iesada as shōgun.
- 1854–55: Treaties are signed with the United States by the shogunate.
- Late 1850s–1860s: The "Sonnō jōi" movement is in full force.
- 1858: The shogunate signs treaties with the Netherlands, Imperial Russia, and Great Britain. Death of the shōgun Tokugawa Iesada; appointment of Tokugawa Iemochi as shōgun.
- March 1860: The Tairō, Ii Naosuke, is assassinated in the Sakuradamon incident.
- 11 November: Sachinomiya is formally proclaimed Crown Prince and given the personal name Mutsuhito.
- 1862: Namamugi Incident.
- 1864–65: Bombardment of Shimonoseki by British, American, French, and Dutch ships; fighting ensues between the shogunate and Chōshū.
- 1866: Death of the shōgun Tokugawa Iemochi; appointment of Tokugawa Yoshinobu as shōgun.
- 31 January 1867: Death of Emperor Kōmei from hemorrhagic smallpox, accession of Mutsuhito to the throne.
- 4 January 1868: Formal restoration of imperial rule; end of 265 years of rule by the Tokugawa shogunate.
- 12 September: Formal enthronement of the emperor.
- 23 October: The era name is changed to Meiji.
- 6 November: The capital is moved from Kyoto Prefecture to Edo, renamed Tokyo.
- 5 November 1872: The emperor receives the Grand Duke Alexei Alexandrovich of Russia.
- Late 1860s–1881: Period of rebellion and assassination in Japan.
- 11 January 1869: Marriage of the emperor to Ichijo Haruko, thenceforth the Empress Dowager Shōken.
- 4 September: The emperor receives The Duke of Edinburgh.
- 1871: The abolition of the han system is proclaimed.
- 1873: Edo Castle is destroyed in a conflagration; the emperor moves to the Akasaka Palace. His first children are born, but die at birth.
- 1877: The Satsuma Rebellion.
- 1878: Assassination of Ōkubo Toshimichi.
- 31 August 1879: Prince Yoshihito, the future Emperor Taishō and the emperor's only surviving son, is born.
- 1881: Receives the first state visit of a foreign monarch, King Kalākaua of Hawaii.
- 1889: Meiji Constitution promulgated; Itō Hirobumi becomes first Prime Minister of Japan.
- 1894: Sino-Japanese War; Japanese victory establishes Japan as a regional power.
- 29 April 1901: Became grandfather when Emperor Taishō's first son, the Prince Hirohito Michi-no-miya, future Emperor Shōwa was born.
- 1904–1905: Russo-Japanese War; Japanese victory earns Japan the status of a great power.
- 1910: The Annexation of Korea by the Empire of Japan: Korea under Japanese rule (-1945).
- 29 July 1912: The emperor dies (aged 59).

== Film depictions ==
Emperor Meiji is portrayed by Toshirō Mifune in the 1980 Japanese war drama film The Battle of Port Arthur (sometimes referred as 203 Kochi). Directed by Toshio Masuda, the film depicted the Siege of Port Arthur during the Russo-Japanese War, and also starred Tatsuya Nakadai (as General Nogi Maresuke), and Tetsurō Tamba (as General Kodama Gentarō).

Emperor Meiji also appears in the 2003 film The Last Samurai, played by Nakamura Shichinosuke II. In the film, the emperor is portrayed as a weak, inexperienced leader under the firm control of his councilors, who intend to have him sign a treaty that would give the United States special trading rights that would enrich them, but also cement foreign domination of Japan. The emperor's determination is only shown at the end of the movie, when he is inspired by a visit from Capt. Nathan Algren (played by Tom Cruise), who fought alongside the rebel samurai, to reject the treaty and dismiss his advisors, declaring that Japan will modernize, but not at the cost of its traditions and history. His appearance bears a strong resemblance to Emperor Meiji during the 1860s (when his authority as emperor was not yet firmly established) rather than during the 1870s, when the film is set.

== Bibliography ==
- Gordon, Andrew (2009), A Modern History of Japan: From Tokugawa Times to the Present (2nd ed.), Oxford University Press, ISBN 978-0-19-533922-2
- Jansen, Marius (1994), Sakamoto Ryoma and the Meiji Restoration, Columbia University Press, ISBN 978-0-231-10173-8
- — (1995), The Emergence of Meiji Japan, Cambridge University Press, ISBN 978-0-521-48405-3
- Keene, Donald (2002), Emperor of Japan: Meiji and His World, 1852–1912, Columbia University Press, ISBN 978-0231123402, OCLC 46731178
- Wilson, George M. (1992), Patriots and Redeemers: Motives in the Meiji Restoration, University of Chicago Press, ISBN 978-0226900919, OCLC 23869701

Emperor Meiji Imperial House of Japan Born: 3 November 1852 Died: 30 July 1912
Regnal titles
Preceded by Kōmei	Emperor of Japan; 3 February 1867 – 30 July 1912	Succeeded by Taishō
