= Matsuura =

Japanese surname

Matsuura (written: 松浦) is a Japanese surname. Notable people with the surname include:

- Akiko Matsuura, Japanese drummer
- Anne Matsuura, American physicist
- Atsushi Matsuura (footballer born 1982), former Japanese football player
- Atsushi Matsuura (musician) (born 1968), Japanese guitarist
- Aya Matsuura (born 1986), Japanese singer and actress
- Daigo Matsuura (born 1969), Japanese politician
- David Matsuura (1963–2020), American politician
- Eleanor Matsuura, actress
- Frank S. Matsura (1873–1913), early twentieth-century Japanese photographer (birth name Sakae Matsuura)
- Hiroko Matsuura (born 1990), Japanese volleyball player
- Hiromi Matsuura (born 1984), Japanese singer and AV idol
- Hiroshi Matsuura (松浦 浩史; born 1968), Japanese ice hockey player
- Hiroyuki Matsuura (松浦 弘幸; born 1937), Japanese ice hockey player
- Junrokurō Matsuura (1884–1944), lieutenant general in the Imperial Japanese Army in the Second Sino-Japanese War
- Kōichirō Matsuura (born 1937), Japanese public servant and current Director-General of UNESCO
- Kosuke Matsuura (born 1979), Japanese race car driver
- Masataka Matsuura (born 1948), Japanese politician
- Masaya Matsuura (born 1961), Japanese video game designer and musician
- Max Matsuura (born 1964), Japanese record producer and president of Avex Trax
- Richard Matsuura (1933 – 1997), American politician
- Shinji Matsuura, a Japanese badminton player
- Tadashi Matsuura (松浦忠史; born 1976), Japanese musician and record producer better known as "Kisaki"
- Matsuura Takeshirō (松浦 武四郎; 1818–1888), Japanese explorer, cartographer, writer, painter, priest and antiquarian
- Takuya Matsuura (born 1988), Japanese football player
- Tokihiko Matsuura (born 1968), Japanese manga artist
- Toshio Matsuura (born 1955), former Japanese football player and manager
- Ushitaro Matsuura (1865 – 1937), Japanese dermatologist

== Fictional characters ==
- Yuu Matsuura, protagonist and title character of the Marmalade Boy manga and anime series
- Kanan Matsuura, a character from Love Live! Sunshine!!

== Other ==
- Matsuura Railway, a railway company on the west side of Kyushu Island.

== See also ==
- Matsura clan

Hereditary lords of the Matsura clan of Hirado

- Matsura Akira (1840–1908), the 12th and final daimyō of the Hirado Domain in Hizen Province, Kyūshū, Japan
- Matsura Hisanobu (1571–1602), daimyō of the late Azuchi-Momoyama period through early Edo period
- Matsura Seizan (1760–1841), daimyō and famed swordsman during the late Edo period of Japan
- Matsura Takanobu (1529–1599), 16th-century Japanese samurai and 25th hereditary lord of the Matsuura clan of Hirado
- Matsura Takanobu (1592–1637), daimyō of the Hirado Domain
