= List of cultural properties of Japan – paintings (Nagasaki) =

This list is of the cultural properties of Japan designated in the category of paintings (絵画, kaiga) for the Prefecture of Nagasaki.

== National Cultural Properties ==
As of 1 July 2019, five Important Cultural Properties have been designated, being of national significance.

Property	Date	Municipality	Ownership	Comments	Image	Dimensions	Coordinates	Ref.
Fudō Myōō with Three Attendants, colour on silk 絹本著色不動明王三童子像 kenpon chakushoku Fudō Myōō san-dōji zō	Kamakura period	Nagasaki	Kiyomizu-dera (清水寺)			278.9 centimetres (109.8 in) by 129.1 centimetres (50.8 in)	32°44′28″N 129°53′03″E	
Nirvana painting, colour on silk 絹本著色仏涅槃図 kenpon chakushoku Butsu nehan zu	Goryeo	Hirado	Saikyō-ji (最教寺)	Goryeo Buddhist painting; alternatively identified as a C16 Joseon work			33°21′47″N 129°33′12″E	
Nirvana painting, colour on silk, by Wu Pin 絹本著色仏涅槃図〈呉彬筆／〉 kenpon chakushoku Butsu nehan zu (Gohin hitsu)	1610	Nagasaki	Sōfuku-ji			400.2 centimetres (157.6 in) by 208.4 centimetres (82.0 in)	32°44′32″N 129°53′01″E	
European Kings and Knights, colour on paper with gold ground, six-panel byōbu 紙本金地著色泰西王侯図〈／六曲屏風〉 shihon kinji chakushoku taisei ōkō zu (rokkyoku byōbu)	Momoyama period	Nagasaki	Nagasaki Museum of History and Culture	pair of screens; see Namban art		123.8 centimetres (48.7 in) by 51.4 centimetres (20.2 in)	32°45′10″N 129°52′46″E	
Carp Leaping the Dragon Gate, by Yūhi 絹本著色鯉魚跳龍門図 熊斐筆 kenpon chakushoku rigyo-chō Ryūmon zu Yūhi hitsu	Edo period (C18)	Nagasaki	Nagasaki Museum of History and Culture			129.6 centimetres (51.0 in) by 53.1 centimetres (20.9 in)	32°45′10″N 129°52′46″E	

== Prefectural Cultural Properties ==
As of 1 May 2019, nineteen properties have been designated at a prefectural level.

Property	Date	Municipality	Ownership	Comments	Image	Dimensions	Coordinates	Ref.
Sacrifice for the Souls in Purgatory, woodblock print with colour applied by brush 木版画筆彩「煉獄の霊魂の救い」 mokuhanga hissai rengoku no reikon no sukui	c.1877	Nagasaki	Shitsu Church (出津教会堂) (kept at the Father de Rotz Memorial Museum (ド・ロ神父記念館))	commissioned from a local artist for missionary use by Father Marc Marie de Rotz (マルク・マリー・ド・ロ)		128 centimetres (4 ft 2 in) by 63 centimetres (2 ft 1 in)	32°50′38″N 129°42′03″E	
Pictorial Biography of Hōnen Shōnin, by Reizei Tamechika 冷泉為恭筆 法然上人行状絵; Reizei Tamechika hitsu Hōnen Shōnin gyōshō-e	Kaei era	Nagasaki	Daion-ji (大音寺)	twelve scrolls with 238 scenes; copy of Pictorial Biography of Enkō Daishi (円光大師行状図), originally commissioned by Emperor Tsuchimikado			32°44′40″N 129°52′57″E	
Portrait of Nagashima Kiku 永島キク刀自絵像; Nagashima Kiku toji ezō	1860	Nagasaki	Nagasaki Museum of History and Culture	colours on silk; by Kawahara Keiga		97.5 centimetres (3 ft 2.4 in) by 37.3 centimetres (1 ft 2.7 in)	32°45′10″N 129°52′46″E	
Our Lady of Seville, copperplate print 銅版画「セビリアの聖母」 dōhanga Sebiria no seibo	1597	Nagasaki	Catholic Archdiocese of Nagasaki	based on a copperplate print by Hieronymus Wierix of a mural in Seville Cathedral; found in Manila by Bernard Petitjean in 1869		21 centimetres (8.3 in) by 13.8 centimetres (5.4 in)	32°46′38″N 129°52′05″E	
Holy Family, copperplate print 銅版画「聖家族」 dōhanga sei-kazoku	1596	Nagasaki	Catholic Archdiocese of Nagasaki	based on an engraving by Rafael Sadeler of a 1584 work by Maerten de Vos, thus enabling identification of the figure in the lacuna; found in Manila by Bernard Petitjean in 1869, presented to the Pope, and transferred to Ōura Church			32°46′38″N 129°52′05″E	
Ceiling paintings 天井絵 tenjō-e	late Edo period	Nagasaki	Kannon-ji (観音寺)	in the Hondō; 150 panels with paintings of flowers; by several hands, including Kawahara Keiga and Ishizaki Yūshi (石崎融思)			32°35′02″N 129°46′30″E	
Buddha's Parinirvana, from Shōfuku-ji 聖福寺の涅槃図; Shōfukuji no nehan zu	early Qing	Nagasaki	Shōfuku-ji				32°45′11″N 129°52′37″E	
Buddha's Parinirvana, from Shuntokuji 春徳寺の涅槃図; Shuntokuji no nehan zu	early Qing	Nagasaki	Shuntoku-ji (春徳寺)				32°45′17″N 129°53′21″E	
Map of Integrated Lands and Regions of Historical Countries and Capitals 混一疆理歴代国都地図; Konitsu kyōri rekidai kokuto chizu	C16	Shimabara	Honkō-ji (本光寺)			219.0 centimetres (7 ft 2.2 in) by 276.8 centimetres (9 ft 1.0 in)	32°47′29″N 130°21′08″E	
Monju Bosatsu 文珠菩薩絵像一幅; Monju Bosatsu ezō ippuku	late Kamakura period	Hirado	Matsura Historical Museum				33°22′23″N 129°33′09″E	
Hara Castle Siege Camps and Castle Interior 原城攻囲陣営並城中図一幅; Hara-jō kōi jinei narabini jōchū no zu ippuku	1637	Hirado	Matsura Historical Museum			186 centimetres (6 ft 1 in) by 195 centimetres (6 ft 5 in)	33°22′23″N 129°33′09″E	
Japanese-Qing Trade at Nagasaki, emaki 長崎日清貿易絵巻三巻; Nagasaki Nisshin bōeki emaki sankan	c. 1800	Hirado	Matsura Historical Museum	three scrolls			33°22′23″N 129°33′09″E	
Japanese-Dutch Trade at Nagasaki, emaki 長崎日蘭貿易絵巻一巻; Nagasaki Nichiran bōeki emaki ikkan	late C18	Hirado	Matsura Historical Museum	one scroll; by Hirowatari Koshū (広渡湖秀); commissioned by Matsura Kiyoshi			33°22′23″N 129°33′09″E	
Portrait of Matsura Yoroshi, colours on silk 絹本著色松浦義像 kenpon chakushoku Matsura Yoroshi zō	C15 (first half)	Hirado	Matsura Historical Museum	the oldest portrait of a samurai in Kyūshū			33°22′23″N 129°33′09″E	
Ships from Foreign Countries, emaki 異国船絵巻一巻 ikoku-sen emaki ikkan	early C17	Hirado	Matsura Historical Museum	one scroll			33°22′23″N 129°33′09″E	
Religious woodblock prints, with colour applied by brush, from Uragashira Church 浦頭教会聖教木版画（筆彩三幅） Uragashira kyōkai seikyō mokuhanga (hissai sanpuku)	c. 1877	Gotō	Uragashira Catholic Church (kept in Dōzaki Church (堂崎教会))	three prints; commissioned from a local artist for missionary use by Father Marc Marie de Rotz (マルク・マリー・ド・ロ); discovered in a house in Gotō in 1973		169 centimetres (5 ft 7 in) by 76.8 centimetres (2 ft 6.2 in)	32°45′21″N 128°50′14″E	
Buddha's Parinirvana, from Reisen-in 醴泉院の涅槃図; Reisen-in no nehan zu	c. 1530	Tsushima	Reisen-in (醴泉院) (kept at Nagasaki Prefectural Tsushima Museum of History and Folk Customs (長崎県立対馬歴史民俗資料館))				34°12′13″N 129°17′15″E	
Shaka and the Sixteen Benevolent Deities, from Reisen-in 醴泉院の釈迦十六善神図; Reisen-in no Shaka jūroku zenjin zu	Nanboku-chō period	Tsushima	Reisen-in (醴泉院) (kept at Nagasaki Prefectural Tsushima Museum of History and Folk Customs (長崎県立対馬歴史民俗資料館))				34°12′13″N 129°17′15″E	
Four Deities of Mount Kōya, colours on silk 絹本着色高野四社明神像 kenpon chakushoku Kōya shisha myōjin zu	mid-Muromachi period	Iki	Sumiyoshi Jinja (住吉神社)	dedicated to the shrine by a resident of Ōsaka in 1894			33°47′18″N 129°42′23″E	

== See also ==
- Cultural Properties of Japan
- List of National Treasures of Japan (paintings)
- Japanese painting
- List of Historic Sites of Japan (Nagasaki)
- Nagasaki Prefectural Art Museum
