= Ishiguro Tadanori =

Japanese Army surgeon inspector general

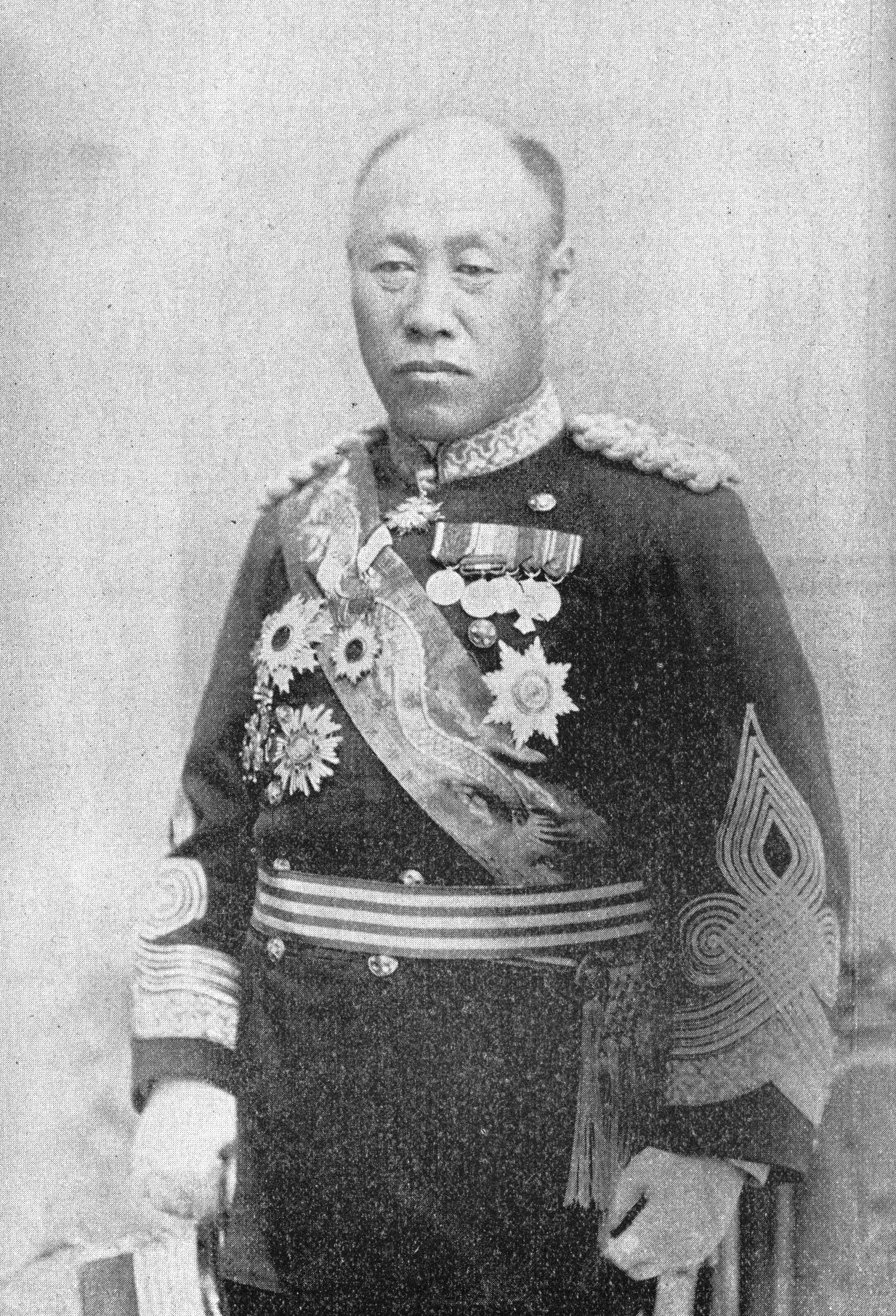
Ishiguro Tadanori

Ishiguro Tadanori (石黒 忠悳; March 18, 1845 [February 11, Kōka 2] – April 26, 1941 [Shōwa 16]) was a Japanese Imperial Army surgeon general during the Meiji period and served as president of the Japanese Red Cross Society. He was also a practitioner of the Japanese tea ceremony. He played a central role in establishing Japan's military medical system in its formative years. His noble title was that of viscount.

== Biography ==
His childhood name was Tsunetarō (written 庸太郎). His father, Hirano Junsaku Yoshitada, served as a clerk (tedai) to a shogunate magistrate, and Tsunetarō was born while his father was stationed at the Yanagawa jin’ya (the former Yanagawa Castle from the Warring States period) in Ōshū (present-day Fukushima Prefecture). In February 1856, he underwent his coming-of-age ceremony and took the name Tadanori (忠恕), calling himself Hirano Tsunetarō Tadanori; he later changed his name to Tadatoku (忠徳), and later again to Tadatoshi (忠悳), using an older form of the character for “virtue” (悳 is an archaic form of 徳). His parents died early, leaving him utterly alone in the world. At the age of sixteen, he was adopted into the Ishiguro family in Katakai Village, Mishima District, Echigo Province (now Ojiya City, Niigata Prefecture), where his father's elder sister had married. He opened a private academy called “Ishiguro Juku” and, after meeting Sakuma Shōzan of Matsushiro, was deeply impressed. At Oiwake-juku on the Nakasendō, he met the Shishi, loyalist activist Ōshima Seifu and formed a close friendship with him. He then went to Edo, graduated from the shogunate's Medical Institute, and became a kudoku-shi (lecturer in reading and interpretation) there.

After the fall of the shogunate and the dissolution of the Medical Institute, he temporarily returned home. During a period when he lived in hiding, he once again opened the private school “Ishiguro Juku,” where he taught Chinese studies and arithmetic to local children (one of his students at the time was Inoue Enryō). He later returned to Tokyo and took a position at the Daigaku Tōkō, the successor to the Medical Institute (and the predecessor of the University of Tokyo Faculty of Medicine). In 1871 (Meiji 4), on the recommendation of Matsumoto Ryōjun, he entered the Ministry of Military Affairs and became one of the pioneering military physicians.

He served in the Saga Rebellion and the Satsuma Rebellion. In September 1887 (Meiji 20), he attended the Fourth International Red Cross Conference held in Karlsruhe, the capital of Baden, Germany, as a government delegate, where he met Kitasato Shibasaburō, Mori Rintarō (Ōgai), Ozawa Shuichi, and others. In 1890 (Meiji 23), he was promoted to Surgeon General of the Army and simultaneously appointed Director of the Medical Affairs Bureau of the Army Ministry—the top position controlling personnel affairs for army medical officers. During the First Sino-Japanese War, he served as Chief of Field Medical and Sanitary Services for the Army Department of the Imperial General Headquarters. During that war, he was held responsible for the widespread devastation caused by beriberi (see “The Large-Scale Beriberi Epidemic in the Army during the Sino-Japanese War” for details). After the war, when Takashima Tomonosuke—who was aware of the beriberi disaster in Taiwan—became Minister of the Army, Hirano resigned as Director of the Medical Affairs Bureau in 1897 (Meiji 30), effectively taking responsibility, despite being a key figure in establishing the military medical system.

He maintained close relations with leading figures of the Chōshū faction such as Yamagata Aritomo, leaders of the Satsuma faction such as Ōyama Iwao, as well as Kodama Gentarō, and continued to exert a quiet but significant influence over the Army Medical Corps (later renamed the Army Medical Service). On April 17, 1901 (Meiji 34), he was transferred to the reserve, then to the second reserve on April 1, 1907 (Meiji 40), and retired from service in 1912.

He was also well known as a Japanese tea ceremony tea master, using the tea names Kyōsai and Kyōō. In 1898 (Meiji 31), he became a member of the rotating tea gathering group “Wakeikai,” founded by Matsuura Akira (Shingetsu-an) together with nobles and prominent figures residing in Tokyo. The sixteen original members—Aochi Ikijirō (Tankai), Itō Shunkichi (Sōyū), Itō Sukemaro (Gen’en), Iwami Kanzō (Rissō), Okazaki Iso (Enchū), Kanazawa Sanemon (Sōfu), Totsuka Bunka (Shiin), Azuma Tanenari (Soun), Higashikuze Michiyoshi (Kohan), Hisamatsu Katsushige (Ninsō), Matsuura Hisashi (Mujin), Mita Yasumitsu (Rien), Mitsui Takahiro (Shōrai), and Yasuda Zenjirō (Shōō)—were collectively known to the public as the “Sixteen Arhats.” (Later, Masuda Takashi [Don’ō] and Takahashi Yoshio [Hōan] joined the group.)

He later served as a member the House of Peers by appointment by the Emperor Meiji and as the fourth president of the Japanese Red Cross Society. In 1895 (Meiji 28), he was granted the title of baron (danshaku), and in 1920 (Taishō 9) he was elevated to the rank of viscount (shishaku). He died of old age in 1941 (Shōwa 16). After his death, the Ishiguro family did not carry out the procedures for succession to the peerage, and in October of the same year lost its noble status.

== Personal life ==
His wife, Kugako, was born in March 1846 (Kōka 3) as the daughter of Adachi Sukeemon and his wife Nuiko, a family of long standing in Yashima, Katakai Village. In 1862, at the age of sixteen, she married Ishiguro. Owing to the devoted support of his wife, he rose steadily through the ranks. She died in March 1925.

Their eldest son, Ishiguro Tadaatsu, graduated from Tokyo Imperial University and then entered the Ministry of Agriculture and Commerce. He married Mitsuko, the second daughter of Hozumi Nobushige. He later served as Minister of Agriculture and Commerce at the time of Japan's surrender at the end of the Pacific War.

He designed a traditional tea house, Shusei-an in Katakai and it is now registered as cultural heritage of Japan.

== Honours ==
- Virtus et Fraternitas Medal, Poland (2026)
