= Matsuura (disambiguation) =

Matsuura is a Japanese surname.

Matsuura may also refer to:

== Places ==
- Matsuura, Nagasaki, a city in Japan
- Matsuura River, a 46 km river in Saga Prefecture, Japan
- Mount Midori, also known as Mount Matsuura, a mountain located in the Daisetsuzan Volcanic Group of the Ishikari Mountains, Hokkaidō, Japan

== Other uses ==
- Matsuura Machinery, an international heavy machinery manufacturing company in Fukui, Fukui Prefecture, Japan
- Matsuura Railway, a railway company in Nagasaki and Saga Prefecture in Japan
- 18903 Matsuura, a main-belt asteroid
