= Ishiguro =

Ishiguro (written: 石黒 lit. "black stone") is a Japanese surname. Notable people with the surname include:

- Aya Ishiguro (石黒彩) (born 1978), a.k.a. Ayappe, singer
- Hidé Ishiguro, Japanese analytic philosopher and academic
- Hideo Ishiguro (石黒英雄), Japanese actor
- Hiroshi Ishiguro (石黒浩), professor at Osaka University who works in robotics
- Kazuo Ishiguro (石黒一雄), Japanese-born British author and Nobel Prize winner
- Keishichi Ishiguro (石黒敬七), Japanese judoka
- Keisho Ishiguro (石黒敬章), Japanese photo collector
- Ken Ishiguro (石黒賢), Japanese actor
- Kenji Ishiguro (石黒健治), Japanese photographer
- Kyōhei Ishiguro (イシグロキョウヘイ) (born 1980), Japanese director
- Masakazu Ishiguro (石黒正数), Japanese manga artist
- Masayuki Ishiguro (石黒将之), Japanese handball player who plays in German
- Naomi Ishiguro (born 1992), British author
- Noboru Ishiguro (石黒昇), Japanese animator and anime series director
- Osamu Ishiguro (石黒修), Japanese tennis player
- Shuichi Ishiguro (石黒 修一; born 1945), Japanese sport wrestler
- Shizuo Ishiguro (1920–2007), Japanese oceanographer
- Tatsuya Ishiguro (石黒竜也), Japanese kickboxer
- Yumiko Ishiguro (石黒由美子), Japanese synchronized swimmer
- Ishiguro Tadanori (石黒忠悳) (1845–1941), Japanese Army physician

== See also ==
- 7354 Ishiguro, a main-belt asteroid
