= Matsura Takanobu (1592–1637) =

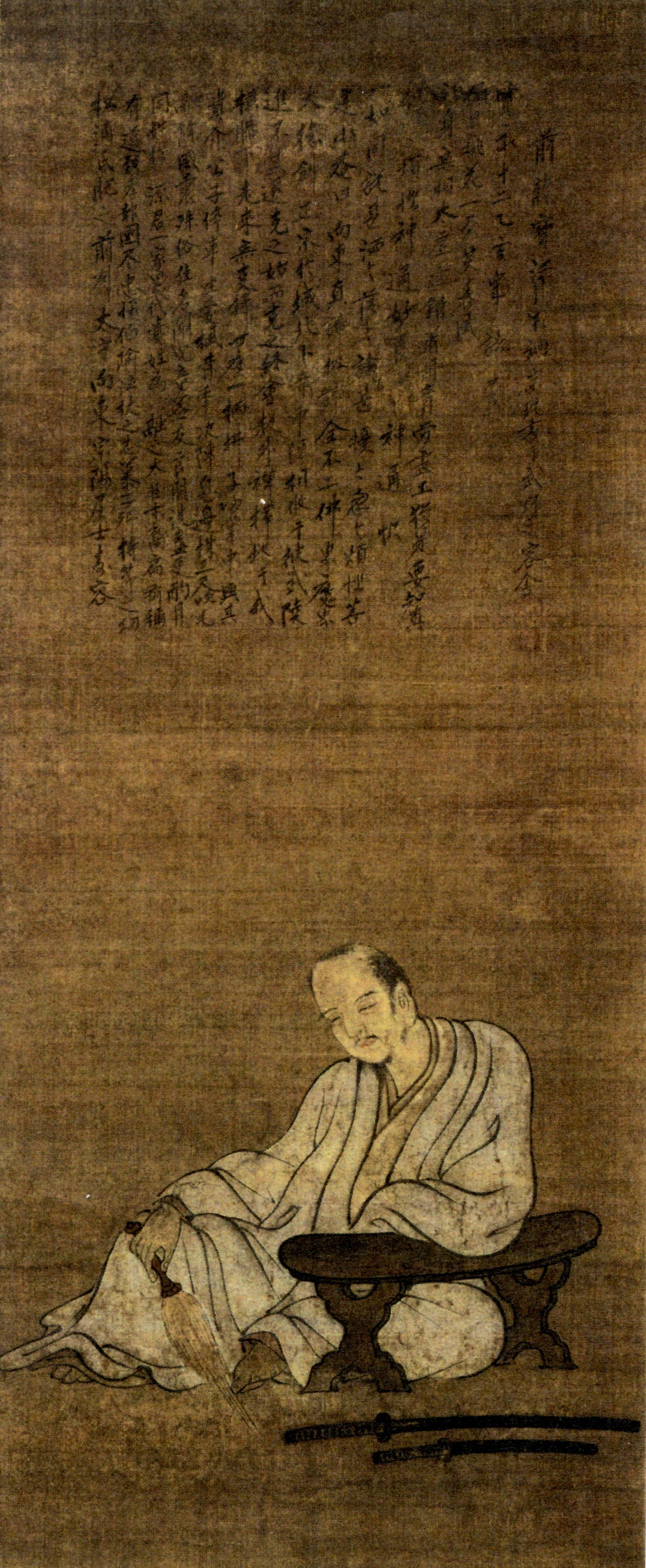
- 1653 portrait of Takanobu by Kanō Yasunobu, with added text by Kōgetsu Sōkan (江月宗玩) (Matsura Historical Museum)

Daimyō of Hirado
- In office 1603–1637
- Preceded by: Matsura Hisanobu
- Succeeded by: Matsura Shigenobu

Personal details
- Parents: Matsura Hisanobu (father); Ōmura Sono (mother)

Matsura Takanobu (松浦 隆信; January 13, 1592 – July 16, 1637) was the 3rd daimyō of Hirado Domain in Hizen Province, Kyūshū, Japan. He was also the 28th hereditary head of the Matsura clan.

Takanobu was the eldest son of Matsura Hisanobu, 2nd daimyo of the domain, and Sono. When his father died suddenly at the age of 32, he became lord of the domain at the age of 12, under the guardianship of his grandfather.

Foreign trade was important to the domain, and Takanobu sought exchanges with Dutch and English merchants.

Takanobu had the Dharma name Shōjū-in (正宗院)) and was also baptised.

== Notes ==
Preceded by Matsura Hisanobu	3rd Daimyō of Hirado; 1603–1637	Succeeded by Matsura Shigenobu
