= Matsura Seizan =

Japanese daimyō (1760–1841)

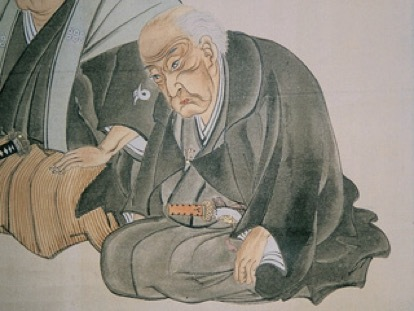
Seizan in 1840 (Matsura Historical Museum)

Matsura Seizan (松浦 静山), born Matsura Kiyoshi (松浦 清, March 7, 1760 – August 15, 1841), was a daimyō, essayist, and famed swordsman during the Edo period of Japan. Seizan was a practitioner of Iba Hideaki's Shingyōtō-ryū school of swordsmanship, in which Seizan was considered as an adept. Seizan adopted the name Joseishi after receiving the final transmission of the Shingyōtō ryu school.

== Lord of Hirado ==
Seizan was born in Edo, at the Hirado-han (Hirado domain) residence, as the oldest son of Matsura Masanobu (1735–1771), the heir apparent of the domain. When his father died before assuming leadership of the clan, Seizan was adopted by his grandfather Matsura Sanenobu. Following the retirement of his grandfather, Seizan became Lord of Hirado at the age of sixteen. (Seizan himself later retired in favor of his son Matsura Hiromu). He applied himself seriously to his official duties, encouraging farming and fishing in his domain and making financial reforms. He also realized the importance of education and founded the Ishinkan, a school promoting both academic and martial studies. Within the school, a variety of different styles were studied, including Shingyōtō-ryū kenjutsu, Enmei-ryū kenjutsu, Ittō-ryū kenjutsu and several schools of sōjutsu.

== Essayist ==
After retiring in 1806, Seizan devoted himself to writing. In 1821, he began writing his Kasshi Yawa (甲子夜話), a collection of essays that eventually grew to 278 volumes. These essays have been republished in 40 volumes by Heibonsha and are regarded as an invaluable reference by historians of the period. Topics range from the politics of the late 18th and early 19th centuries through the mores and customs of daimyo, samurai, and commoners of the time.

Seizan was acquainted with Matsudaira Sadanobu, chief councilor to the Tokugawa shogunate from 1787 to 1793, who initiated the Kansei Reforms. He was also interested in the Western learning that entered Japan via trading contacts with Dutch merchants (a globe that he owned is still preserved in the Matsura Historical Museum), and a collector of popular novels and paintings by masters of ukiyo-e art.

== Writings on swordsmanship ==
Seizan wrote many essays on the art of the sword, including Joseishi Kendan and Kenkō. Seizan's works are considered as important documents in the history of Japanese swordsmanship. In Josieshi Kendan he mentions Miyamoto Musashi's Enmei ryū, but denies personal knowledge of the style.

Seizan himself studied a number of styles of martial arts during his life as well as the Shingyōtō ryu, including Heki ryu archery, Tamiya ryu iaijutsu, Koshin ryu sojutsu, Sekiguchi ryu jujutsu, as well as horsemanship and gunnery. He did not confine his studies to the martial side, however. He was a student of the noted eclectic Neo-Confucian scholar, Minagawa Kien, and had many contacts in the artistic and literary worlds. His first meeting with Kien, the man who would become his teacher in philosophy, was less than auspicious: he overheard Kien talking about swordsmanship, interrupted, and questioned whether Kien was even capable of using the swords he carried at his waist. Kien replied that if Seizan had any doubts on the matter, he should draw his sword and attack him right there and then; if not he should keep quiet, going on to say that whenever he took up his swords, it was always with the determination to use them should it prove necessary. Seizan was impressed, writing that this attitude was at the heart of swordsmanship.

Seizan's writings on the sword show a pronounced Neo-Confucian influence, yet they are not purely academic; they also reflect his profound practical experience in swordsmanship. While his texts demonstrate the disciplined and scholarly aspects of his personality, various anecdotes, found both in his writings and elsewhere, illuminate other dimensions of his character.

== Later life ==
During the Tenpō era of the 1830s, there were reports of an old man traveling around the outskirts of Edo, using a broken bow stave as a cane. He successfully fought all challengers, giving the losers a sound thrashing and confiscating their swords. These incidents ran into the dozens, and the losers included several men who were later to become famous swordsmen.

Seizan's daughter Matsura Aiko (1818–1906) married Nakayama Tadayasu, a courtier and later peer at the imperial court. Their daughter Nakayama Yoshiko (1836–1907) was the mother of the Emperor Meiji.

== Ancestry ==
Ancestors of Matsura Seizan

16. Matsura Shigenobu, 4th Lord of Hirado (1622–1703)
8.Matsura Atsunobu, 6th Lord of Hirado (1684–1757)
17. Oka
4. Matsura Sanenobu, 8th Lord of Hirado (1712–1779)
9. Ikeuchi
2. Matsura Masanobu (1735–1771)
5. Miyagawa
1. Matsura Seizan, 9th Lord of Hirado
3. Motai Tomoko

== Works ==
- Matsura, Seizan. Kasshi Yawa (甲子夜話). 40 volumes (1977–1983). Edited by Mitsutoshi Nakano and Yukihiko Namamura. 東洋文庫. Heibonsha.
