= Hisanobu =

- Gender: Male

Origin
- Origin: Japanese
- Meaning: Different meanings depending on the kanji used

Hisanobu (written: 久信) is a masculine Japanese given name. Notable people with the name include:

- Matsura Hisanobu (松浦 久信) (1571–1602), Japanese daimyō
- Hisanobu Watanabe (渡辺 久信) (born 1965), Japanese baseball player and manager
