= List of Intangible Cultural Properties of Japan (Mie) =

This list is of the Intangible Cultural Properties of Japan in the Prefecture of Mie.

== National Cultural Properties ==
As of 1 February 2015, one Important Intangible Cultural Property has been designated, being of national significance.

=== Craft Techniques ===
Property	Holder	Comments	Image	Ref.
Ise-katagami 伊勢型紙; Ise-katagami	Ise-katagami Technique Preservation Society (伊勢型紙技術保存会)			

== Prefectural Cultural Properties ==
As of 1 May 2014, two properties have been designated at a prefectural level.

=== Performing Arts ===
Property	Holder	Comments	Image	Ref.
Kameyama Domain Shingyōtō-ryū Martial Art 亀山藩御流儀心形刀流武芸形; Kameyama-han onryūgi shingyōtō-ryū bugei-gata	Shingyōtō-ryū Preservation Society (心形刀流保存赤心会)			

=== Craft Techniques ===
Property	Holder	Comments	Image	Ref.
Kuwana Banko (red painted) 桑名萬古（赤絵） Kuwana banko (aka-e)	Kaga Zuisan (加賀瑞山)	ceramics		

== Municipal Cultural Properties ==
As of 1 May 2014, eleven properties have been designated at a municipal level.

== See also ==
- Cultural Properties of Japan
