= Shōtō-in =

Early Christian in Japan

- 松東院
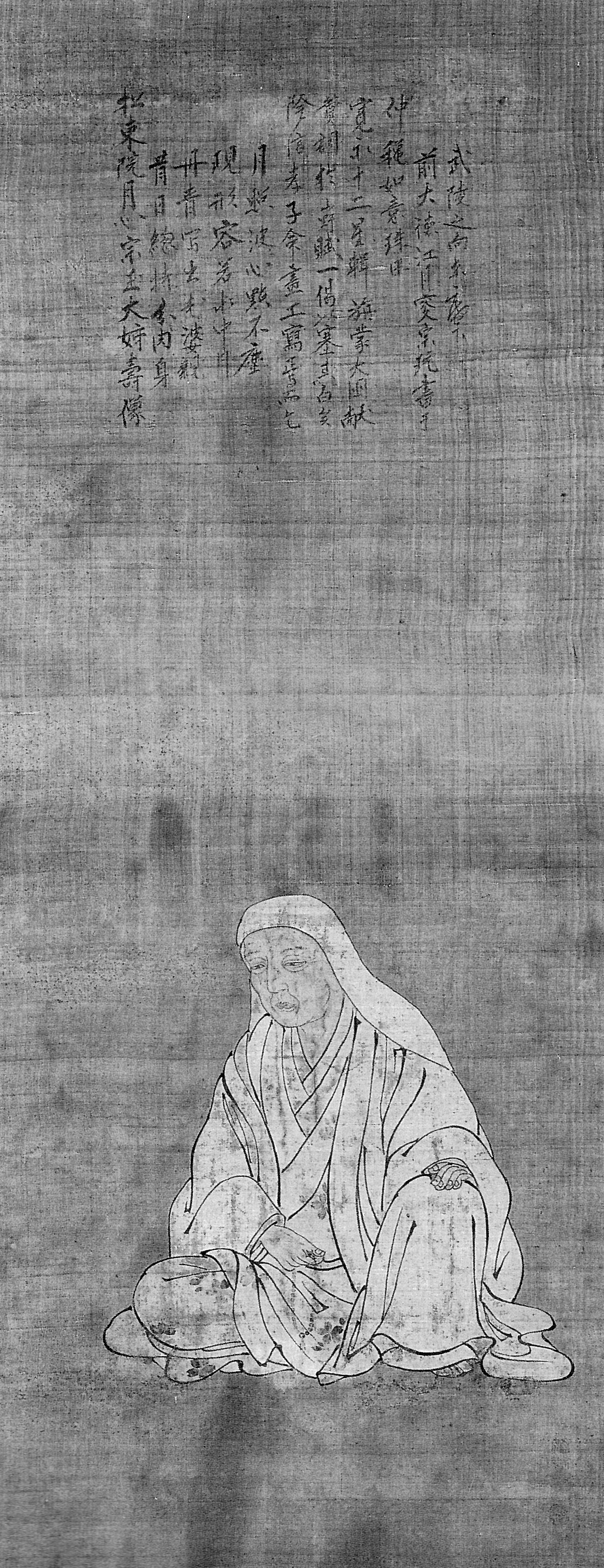
- Portrait of Shōtō-in in 1653 by Kanō Yasunobu, with added text by Kōgetsu Sōkan (江月宗玩) (Matsura Historical Museum)
- Born: Sono (その); 1571?
- Died: 1656
- Other names: Mencia
- Spouse: Matsura Hisanobu,
- Children: Takanobu, Seijō-in (Koto)
- Father: Ōmura Sumitada

Shōtō-in (松東院) (1571? – 1656) was an early Christian in Japan. By birth Ōmura Sono, she took the Christian name Mencia (メンシア). The fifth daughter of Christian daimyō Ōmura Sumitada, she was the wife of Matsura Hisanobu and the mother of Matsura Takanobu.

Portraits dating to 1653 by Kanō Yasunobu of Shōtō-in, of her son Shōjū-in (正宗院) (the Dharma name of Takanobu), and of her second daughter Seijō-in (清浄院) are preserved in the Matsura Historical Museum in Hirado.

== See also ==
- Hirado Domain
- Ōmura Domain
- Kakure kirishitan
