= Itō Sukemaro =

Viscount Itō Sukemaro
- 伊東 祐麿
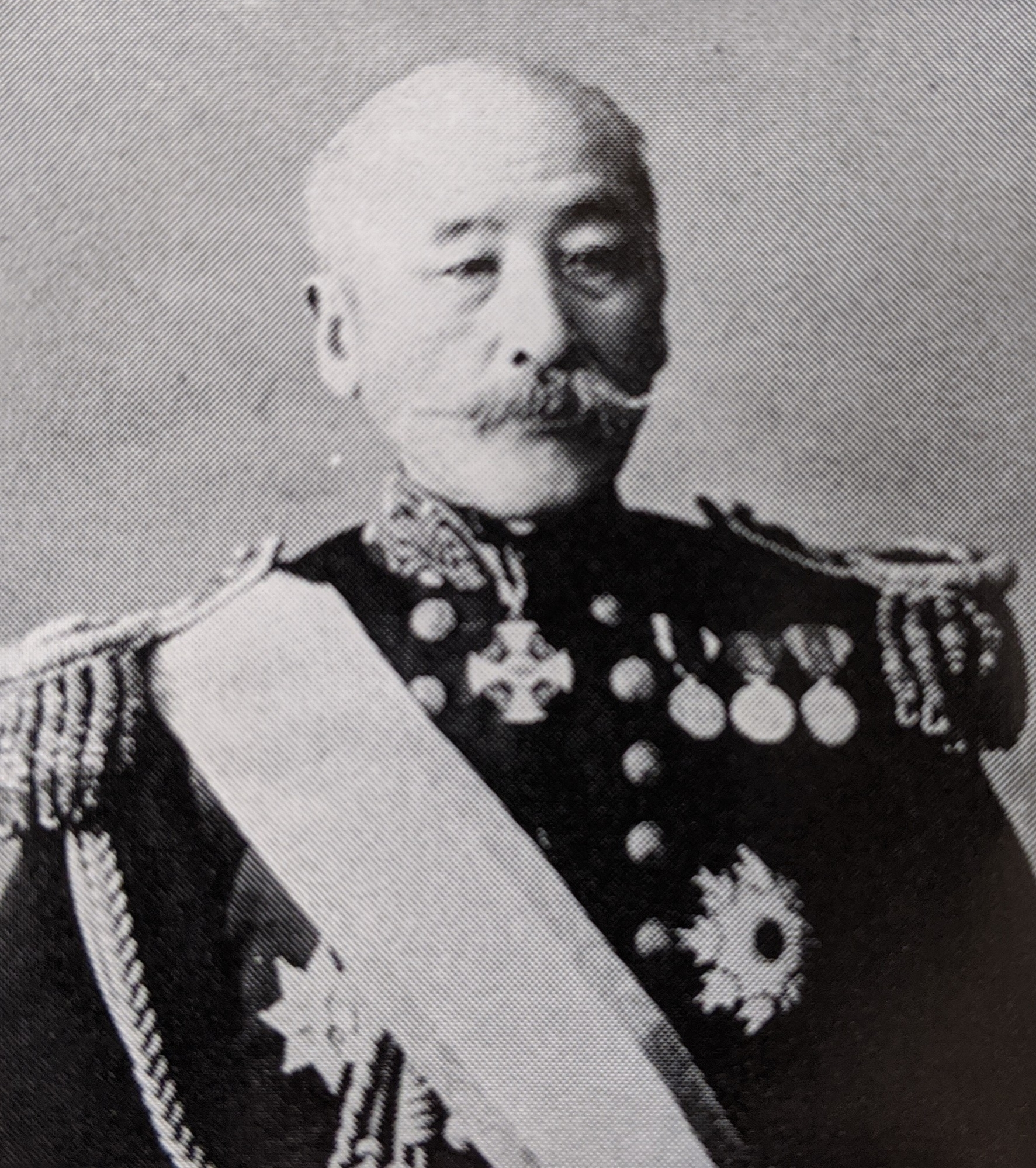
- Born: September 19, 1832
- Died: February 26, 1906 (aged 73)
- Military career
- Allegiance: Empire of Japan
- Branch: Imperial Japanese Navy
- Service years: 1870–1899
- Rank: Vice Admiral
- Conflicts: First Sino-Japanese War; Russo-Japanese War

Viscount Itō Sukemaro (伊東 祐麿, Sukemaro Itō; September 19, 1832 – February 26, 1906) was a vice admiral of the Imperial Japanese Navy, member of the Genrōin and House of Peers, and tea master.

== Biography ==
He was born on September 19, 1832, as the second son of Yusuke Itō, a samurai of the Satsuma domain. After serving as a captain of the Satsuma domain's artillery, he became the second-in-command of the Kasuga in 1868, and then the captain of the Inuikō Maru.

In 1870, he served in the Meiji government and was commissioned as a lieutenant commander in the Navy. After serving as the captain of the Ryūjō, In 1872, he was promoted to the rank of Rear Admiral. On the same year, he served in the Saga Rebellion as a member of the expeditionary force. He served as Commander of the Eastern Command and Commander-in-Chief of the Yokosuka Naval District. During the Civil War, he was sent as the commander of the naval fleet and became a vice admiral in November 1878. He served as Director General of the Military Affairs Bureau of the Ministry of the Navy, Director of the Naval Academy, and was transferred to the rear guard in April 1899. He retired on October 19, 1905.

In 1898, he became a member of the Wakeikai, a group of tea masters established by Matsura Akira in Tokyo with other members of the nobility and well-known personalities at the time. The members of this group included: Ikujiro Aochi, Ishiguro Tadanori, Itō Toshiyoshi, Kanzo Iwami, Koremoto Okazaki, San'emon Kanazawa, Bunkai Totsuka, Endō Taneki, Higashikuze Michitomi, Katsunari Hisamatsu, Tsune Matsuura, Sumiko Mita, Takahiro Mitsui, and Yasuda Zenjirō. (Note: Later, Masuda Takashi and Yoshio Takahashi also joined the group.) The group were known as the "Sixteen Arhats" internationally.

He was appointed as a member of the House of Peers on July 10, 1890, and was knighted a viscount in July 1884, making him a member of the Kazoku.

== Awards ==
- July 7, 1884 – Knighted as Viscount
- November 2, 1887 – Grand Cordon of the Order of the Rising Sun
- November 25, 1889 – Order of the Preparation of the Constitution of the Empire of Japan

== Bibliography ==
- Hata, Ikuhiko, ed. (2005). Japanese Army and Navy Comprehensive Encyclopedia (2 ed.). Tokyo: University of Tokyo Press.
- Toyama, Misao, ed. (1981). Rikkai-gun Shogun Jinrankan Soran Kaigun Hen. Fuyoshobo Shuppan.
- Fukukawa, Hideki, ed. (1981). Dictionary of Japanese Navy Generals. Fuyoshobo Shuppan.
