= Barbara Tabachnick =

American psychologist

Barbara G. Tabachnick
- Known for: Multivariate statistics; statistical methods in behavioral research
- Notable work: Using Multivariate Statistics
- Scientific career
- Fields: Psychology

Barbara G. Tabachnick is an American psychologist, researcher, author, and visual artist. She is professor emerita of psychology at California State University, Northridge (CSUN), where she taught from 1971 until her retirement in 1996. She is best known as co-author of the widely used textbook Using Multivariate Statistics with Linda S. Fidell. Her research has covered multivariate analysis, psychophysics, ethics in psychology, environmental noise, and fetal alcohol spectrum disorders. Since the early 2000s she has also worked as an exhibiting visual artist, with work held in permanent museum collections.

== Early life and education ==
Tabachnick earned a B.A. in psychology from the University of California, Los Angeles (UCLA) in 1964, graduating with honors. She completed an M.A. in 1968 and a Ph.D. in psychology in 1971 at UCLA. Her doctoral dissertation was titled Contextual Effects in Discriminability Scaling.

== Academic career ==
In 1971, Tabachnick joined the Department of Psychology at CSUN as a lecturer. She was promoted to assistant professor in 1972, associate professor in 1975, and full professor in 1979, before retiring in 1996 with the title of professor emerita.

At CSUN, she taught courses in statistics, experimental psychology, sensation and perception, stress, and research methodology at both undergraduate and graduate levels. She also presented workshops and short courses on advanced data analysis and multivariate methods at professional meetings such as the Western Psychological Association.

Outside CSUN, Tabachnick consulted for hospitals, universities, nonprofit organizations, and research centers, including Boston Children’s Hospital/Harvard Medical School, the University of New Mexico, and the University of North Carolina at Chapel Hill. She remained active in research after her retirement, contributing as a statistician to peer-reviewed studies of fetal alcohol spectrum disorders and environmental noise into the 2020s.

== Research and publications ==
Tabachnick's methodological works, particularly Using Multivariate Statistics, have become standard references in the behavioral and social sciences. She has written more than 80 articles and technical reports and given more than 60 professional presentations, and has consulted across research areas including professional ethics, the effects of age and substances on driving and performance, educational computer games, noise-induced annoyance and sleep disturbance, and fetal alcohol syndrome.

Using Multivariate Statistics expanded through successive editions from about 500 pages and six technique chapters to about 1,000 pages and twelve chapters by its sixth edition in 2012. It added methods including as logistic regression, survival analysis, structural equation modeling, multilevel modeling, multiway frequency analysis, and time-series analysis. The book is widely cited in the behavioral, social, and health sciences as a practical reference. Tabachnick also co-authored Experimental Designs Using ANOVA (2007) and Computer-Assisted Research Design and Analysis (2000) with Linda S. Fidell.

Much of her applied research has concerned the epidemiology and neuropsychological outcomes of fetal alcohol spectrum disorders, including a series of population-based studies in South Africa and the United States carried out with Philip A. May and colleagues. She studied human responses to aircraft noise, including sleep disturbance and other environmental impacts with Sanford Fidell.

Tabachnick also published on stress and coping mechanisms among college students, and on professional ethics in psychology and higher education, the latter including national surveys of psychologists' beliefs and practices. More recently, she contributed to the measurement and assessment of learning in educational video games, including work on the CyGaMEs approach to embedded assessment.

== Art career ==
Tabachnick is a visual artist. She studied art at CSUN and UCLA and, since the early 2000s, has worked in media including acrylics, encaustic, watercolor, mixed media, digital images, and welded sculpture. Her work is held in the permanent collections of the Museum of Encaustic Art in Cerrillos, New Mexico, and the Nagasaki Prefectural Art Museum in Japan.

She has shown in solo, shared, and juried group exhibitions, predominantly in the Los Angeles area as well as internationally, including in Japan, Armenia, China, and the Philippines. Her work has appeared at venues such as LAAA/Gallery 825, the San Fernando Valley Arts and Cultural Center, TAG Gallery and the Encaustic Art Institute, and she has received numerous juried awards, including several "Best in Show" honors. She is an exhibiting member of the California Art League and has served on the boards of Collage Artists of America and LELA International; her other affiliations include the Women's Caucus for Art, the Los Angeles County Museum of Art, the Museum of Contemporary Art, Los Angeles, and the National Museum of Women in the Arts. She was profiled by VoyageLA in 2024.

== Awards and recognition ==
- National Science Foundation Fellowship (1969–1971).
- CSUN Meritorious Performance and Professional Promise Award (1988).
- Western Psychological Association Lifetime Achievement Award (2012).
- Honorable mention (tied for highest award), NSF and Science International Science & Engineering Visualization Challenge, games and apps category (2013).
- Western Psychological Association Presidential Citation (2015).

== Selected works ==
- Tabachnick, Barbara G.; Fidell, Linda S. (2019). Using Multivariate Statistics (7th ed.). Pearson. ISBN 9780134790541.
- Tabachnick, Barbara G.; Fidell, Linda S. (2007). Experimental Designs Using ANOVA. Duxbury. ISBN 9780534405144.
- Tabachnick, Barbara G.; Fidell, Linda S. (2000). Computer-Assisted Research Design and Analysis. Allyn & Bacon.
- Tabachnick, Barbara G.; Fidell, Linda S. (1983). Using Multivariate Statistics. Harper & Row.

== See also ==
- Multivariate statistics
- Experimental psychology
- Psychometrics
