= Matsura clan =

Japanese samurai family

- The Matsura mon
- Home province: Hizen Province
- Final ruler: Matsura Akira
- Founding year: 1000s
- Dissolution: 1871

The Matsura clan, also spelled Matsuura, was a medieval and early modern Japanese samurai family who ruled Hirado Domain in Hizen Province on the island of Kyushu. They started as a group of military families under the name Matsura-to. They were involved in Toyotomi Hideyoshi's Kyushu campaign and the Japanese invasions of Korea. Around 1590, they built their seat, Hirado Castle. In 1871, the Meiji Restoration dissolved Japan's feudal lords, and the clan's final daimyo, Matsura Akira, was put into the kazoku class.

== History ==
A map of Japan's former provinces, with Hizen highlighted

The Matsura-to, or the Matsuura-to, was a group of petty military families that had roots in the 11th century in Hizen Province on the island of Kyushu. In the 1220s, they were known as pirate bands who sailed to Korea to "destroy people's dwellings and plunder their property." From the 13th century onwards, they ran Hirado Domain in Hizen. By 1371, the Matsura became allied with the shugo of Totomi Province, Imagawa Sadayo, along with the Shimazu and the Ouchi clans. By the 1400s, the group's leadership was mainly made up of petty barons. In the 1440s and 1450s, Korea attempted to make peace with the Matsura by issuing them ceremonial copper seals, given to those in maritime affairs that the Koreans had a "favored status" for. Eventually, the group's leaders became samurai and daimyo.

=== Matsura Takanobu ===
Matsura Takanobu was born in 1529, and would become a daimyo. He established good relations with the Chinese sea king, Wang Zhi. From the 1550s to 1562, Portuguese traders stayed at Hirado Castle, as well as other locations. Takanobu's wish to please the Portuguese Christian missionaries influenced him to warmly receive Christian missionary, Francis Xavier. This was only at first. By 1557, after Padre Gaspar Vilela baptized multiple people in the Hirado domain of Takanobu's vassal, Dom Antonio Koteda Yatsutsune. His method of evangelization involved burning and destroying Buddhist images. Because of this, in 1558, Takunobe expelled the padre from the clan's territory, and it was ruled no missionary would be allowed to stay there for five years. Jesuits warned Portuguese traders not to go to Hirado, but they disregarded the advice and went in 1562. They lost most of their goods in a fire, which was acknowledged or ordered by Takanobu. In 1565, the Portuguese listened when the Jesuits warned Captain-Major Dom João Pereira, with his Great Ship and his companion galiot, to steer over to the domain of the Christian daimyo Omura Sumitada in Fukuda. Takanobu conspired with Sakai merchants to mobilize a fleet of eighty vessels with the goal of seizing the Portuguese ships and goods. In the Battle of Fukuda Bay, the galiot's artillery drove Takanobu's forces off, "inflicting severe casualties on the attackers and demonstrating the superiority of Western weapons."

In the late 1560s, the Ouchi in northern Kyushu fell, and their territory was fought for by the rivaling forces of Otomo Sorin and Mori Motonari. The Otomo took control of most of northern Kyushu by autumn 1569. Takanobu retired in 1568 and was succeeded by his son, Matsura Shigenobu.

=== Matsura Shigenobu ===
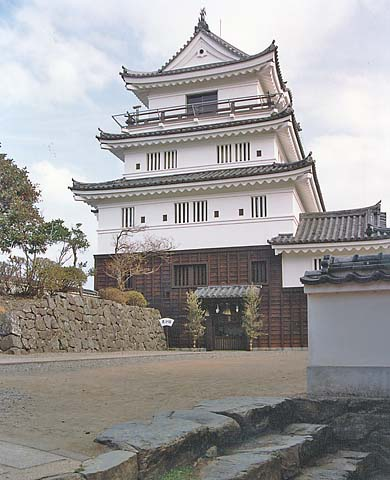
Hirado Castle, the clan's seat in Hizen Province

In 1570, the Otomo sent an invasion force to capture Saga Fortress in northeastern Hizen, ran by Motonari's ally and Matsura Takanobu's captain, Ryuzoji Takanobu. Ryuzoji won the fight and eventually conquered Hizen in the 1570s, including Matsura territory. In 1587, Toyotomi Hideyoshi invaded the territory as a part of his Kyushu campaign against the Shimazu, and the Matsura allied with him. Toyotomi was ultimately victorious, and the different clans, Matsura included, were given their own territories. Despite Toyotomi's anti-Christian edict, Shigenobu allowed Christianity into his family, when he arranged the marriage between his son Hisanobu, and the daughter of Omura Sumitada. Shigenobu's grandson, Takanobu II, was baptised in 1591. The Matsura built their seat, Hirado Castle, around 1590, though a fort had been there since around 1260.

Shigenobu served in both invasions of Korea in Konishi Yukinaga's division. He was in various battles, including the landing at Pusan on 23 May 1592, the Siege of Tongnae, the battle at Pyongyang, and the siege at Namwon. He fought with Hisanobu.

When Shigenobu returned from Korea, he was ordered to extend the anti-Christian edict into his territory. Takanobu I died in 1599, which turned Shigenobu from "tolerant overlord to persecutor". He wrote to Hisanobu that everyone in the family must attend Takanobu's funeral, or else they would be expelled from Hirado. The Christians, Shigenobu's daughter-in-law included, believed that entering a Buddhist temple and taking part in a pagan funeral would compromise their beliefs. Allied families of the Matsura, the Koteda and Ichibu (from Tachiura and Yamada domains), planned to leave the territory. As they left, 600 people joined them. Shigenobu was angry and appointed new rulers of Tachiura and Yamada. The new rulers destroyed the Koteda and Ichibu headquarters, burned down churches, and built a Buddhist temple, Shuzen-ji, on the site of one of the former churches.

=== Matsura Hisanobu and Takanobu II ===
The clan survived the Battle of Sekigahara in 1600, and when Tokugawa Ieyasu established the Tokugawa shogunate, the clan retained their former territories and rulers. In 1601, Hisanobu became daimyo, and ruled for only a year before dying in 1602. Takanobu II succeeded. He renounced his baptism, and continued the persecution of Christians. When the Dutch arrived in Hizen in the 1600s, they paid rent to the Matsura to build a series of houses there. In 1614, Ieyasu issued an edict expelling all foreign priests and closing churches. Takanobu II died in 1637.

=== Matsura Masashi ===
In the late 17th century, the daimyo Matsura Masashi ruled.

=== Matsura Akira ===
During the Meiji Restoration of the 1860s, Japan's feudal lords were merged into one artistocratic kazoku class. The last daimyo of the clan, Matsura Akira, was deprived of his lordly privileges in 1871. He and his family were moved to Tokyo, and he became kazoku. He would be summoned by Chancellor of State Sanjo Sanetomi to "visit the Imperial Palace, listen to imperial ordinances, to offer congratulations to the Meiji emperor on occasions such as his birthday, or simply to visit the palace for social functions."

== Notable people ==
- Matsura Takanobu (1529–1599)
- Matsura Shigenobu (1549–1614)
- Matsura Hisanobu (1571–1602)
- Matsura Takanobu II (1591–1637)
- Matsura Masashi
- Matsura Akira

== Works cited ==
- Boxer, C. R. (1948). Fidalgos in the Far East, 1550–1770. The Hague: Martinus Nijhoff.
- Gunn, Geoffrey C. (2017). World Trade Systems of the East and West, Brill. ISBN 978-90-04-35856-0.
- Hall, John Whitney; McClain, James L. (1993). The Cambridge History of Japan: Volume 4, Cambridge University. ISBN 978-0-521-22355-3.
- Oshikiri, Taka (2018). Gathering for Tea in Modern Japan, Bloomsbury Publishing. ISBN 978-1-350-01400-8.
- Schmorleitz, Morton S. (2011). Castles in Japan, Tuttle Publishing. ISBN 978-1-4629-1217-9.
- Turnbull, Stephen (1998). The Kakure Kirishitan of Japan, Taylor & Francis. ISBN 978-1-136-75160-8.
- Turnbull, Stephen (2001). The Samurai Sourcebook, Cassell. ISBN 978-1-85409-523-7.
- Yamamura, Kozo (1990). The Cambridge History of Japan: Volume 3, Cambridge University. ISBN 978-0-521-22354-6.
