= Nagasaki Prefectural Art Museum =

Art museum in Nagasaki, Nagasaki Prefecture, Japan

- 長崎県美術館
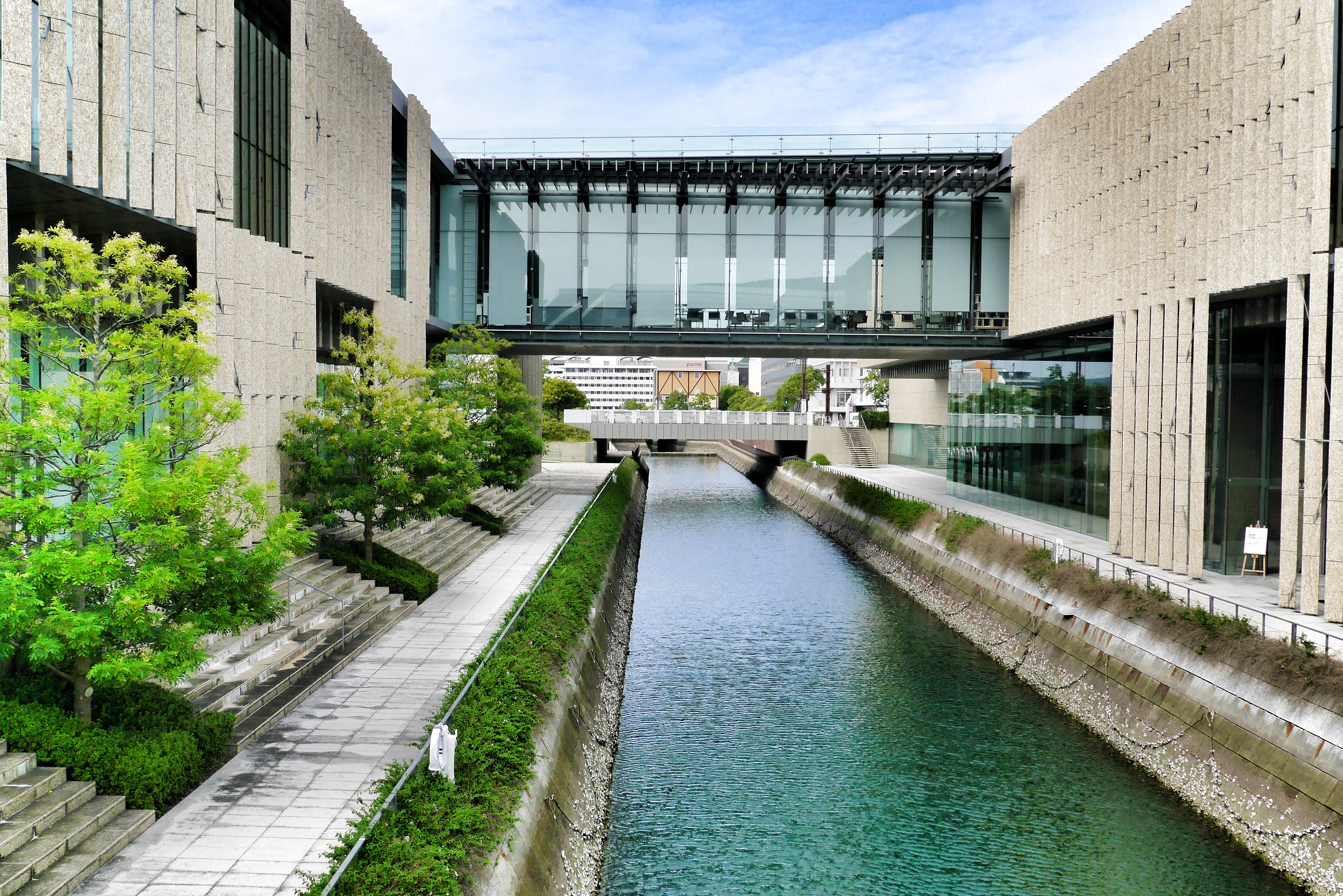
- Interactive map of the Nagasaki Prefectural Art Museum area

General information
- Location: 2-1, Dejima-machi, Nagasaki, Nagasaki Prefecture, Japan
- Coordinates: 32°44′31″N 129°52′13″E
- Opened: April 2005

Design and construction
- Architect: Kengo Kuma

Website
- Official website

Nagasaki Prefectural Art Museum (長崎県美術館, Nagasaki-ken Bijutsukan) opened in Nagasaki, Nagasaki Prefecture, Japan, in 2005. The collection comprises artworks relating to Nagasaki as well as works of Spanish art collected by Suma Yakichiro (須磨弥吉郎), special envoy to Spain during the Second World War. Alongside the Nagasaki Museum of History and Culture, which opened the same year, it supersedes and replaces the former Nagasaki Prefectural Museum and Art Museum (長崎県立美術博物館), which closed at the end of 2002.

== See also ==
- List of Cultural Properties of Japan - paintings (Nagasaki)
