= Shōfuku-ji (Nagasaki) =

Buddhist temple in Nagasaki Prefecture, Japan

Shōfuku-ji 聖福寺
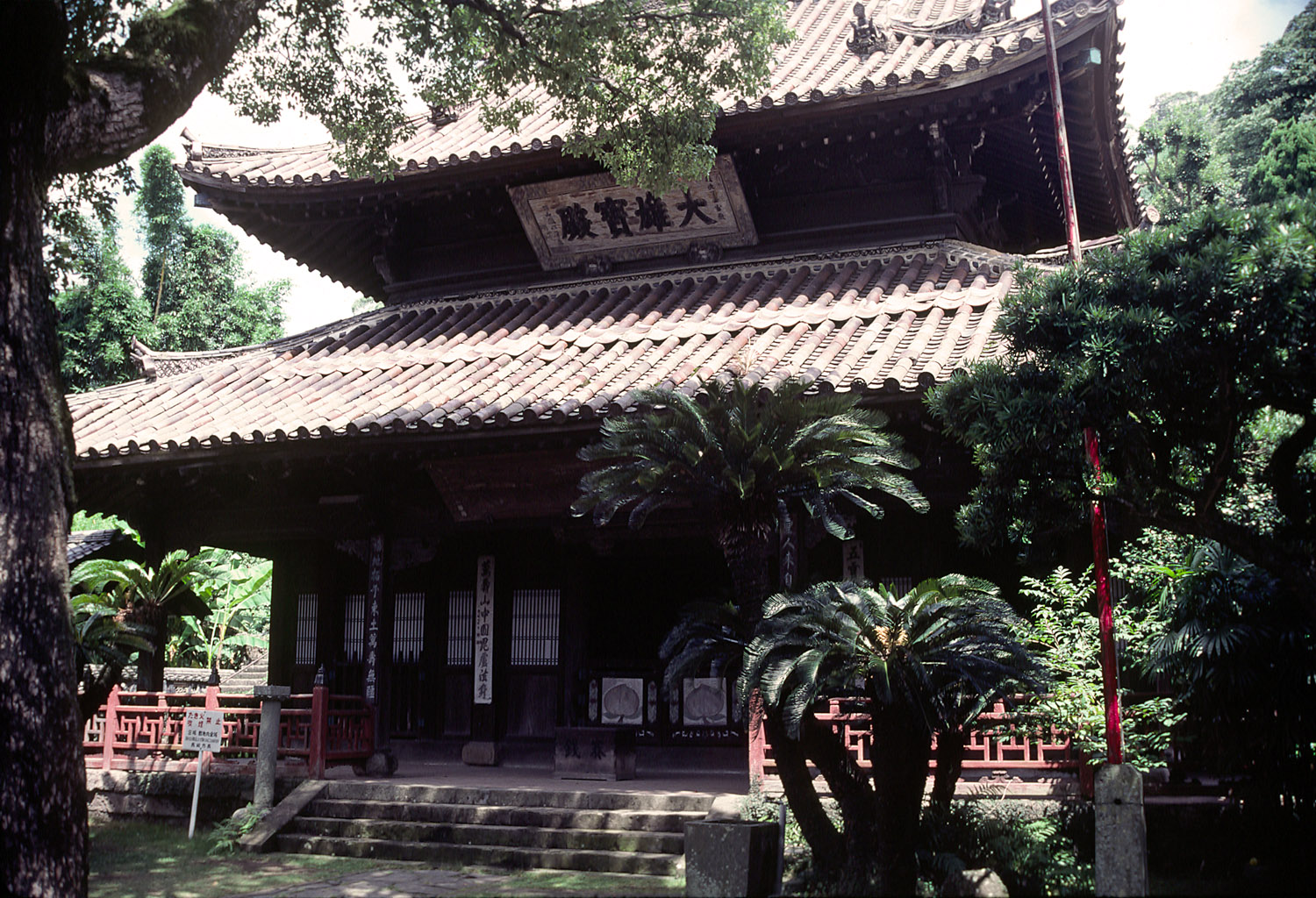
- Main Hall

Religion
- Affiliation: Ōbaku

Location
- Location: 3-77 Tamazono-machi, Nagasaki, Nagasaki Prefecture
- Country: Japan
- Interactive map of Shōfuku-ji 聖福寺
- Coordinates: 32°45′11″N 129°52′37″E

Architecture
- Founder: Tetsushin Dōhan
- Completed: 1677

Website
- Facebook

Shōfuku-ji (聖福寺) is an Ōbaku Zen temple in Nagasaki, Nagasaki, Japan. Its honorary sangō prefix is Manjusan (万寿山).

Shōfuku-ji was the fourth of a series of temples built in the 17th century by the Chinese community of Nagasaki. Its construction was completed in 1677 by Chinese merchants from the Canton region. However Shōfuku-ji is not always included with the other Chinese temples (Fukusai-ji, Sōfuku-ji, and Kofukuji) as the earlier temples did not initially belong to the Ōbaku sect, whereas Shōfuku-ji was founded by a disciple of Ingen, his grandson Tetsushin Douhan.
