= Matsura Historical Museum =

- 松浦史料博物館
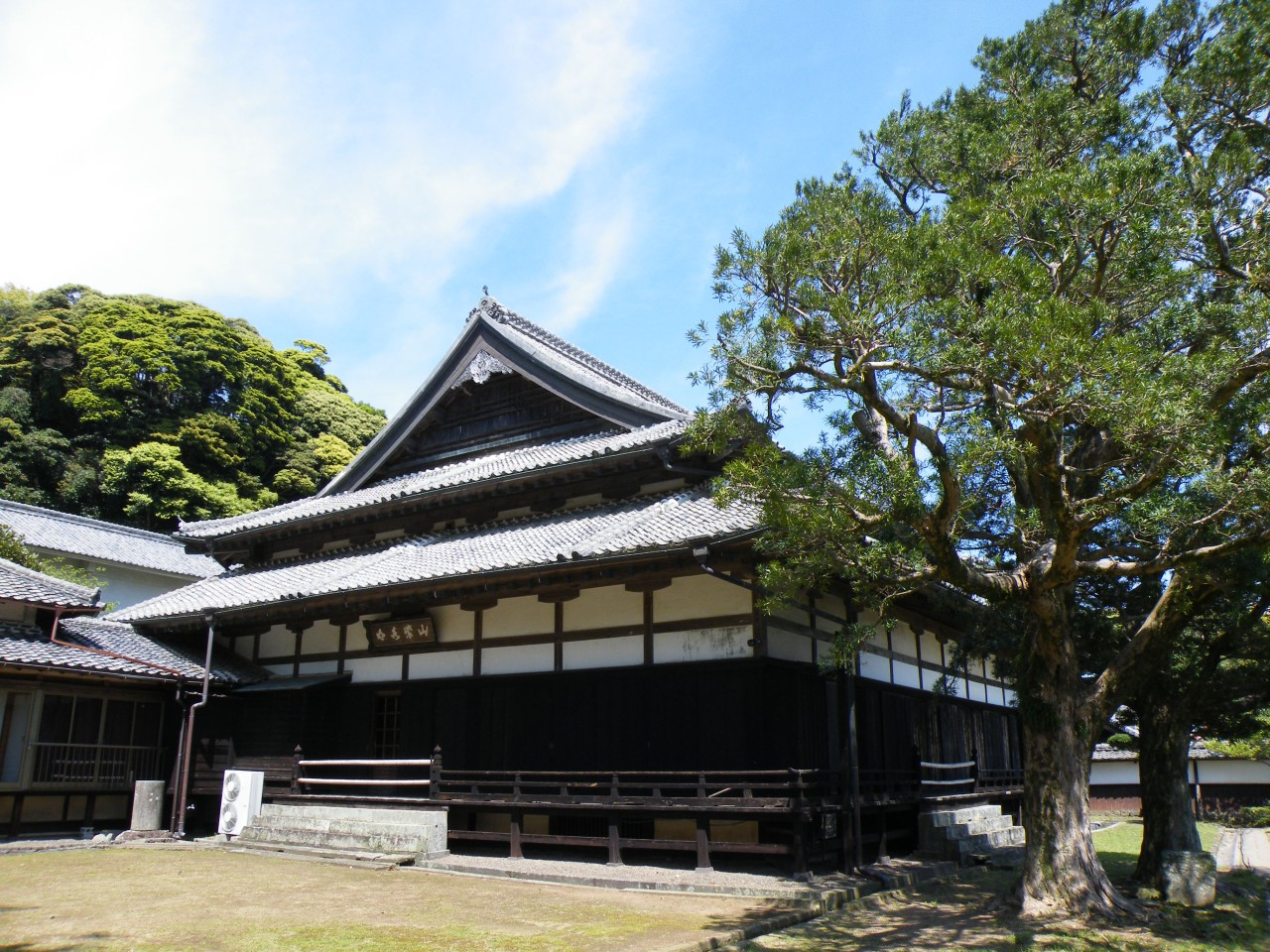
- Interactive map of the Matsura Historical Museum area

General information
- Location: 12 Kagamigawa-chō, Hirado, Nagasaki Prefecture, Japan
- Coordinates: 33°22′23″N 129°33′09″E
- Opened: 1955

Website
- Official website

Matsura Historical Museum (松浦史料博物館, Matsura Shiryō Hakubutsukan) opened in Hirado, Nagasaki Prefecture, Japan, in 1955. The museum is housed in the 1893 Tsurugamine Mansion of the Matsura family, former daimyō of the Hirado Domain.

== See also ==
- List of Cultural Properties of Japan - paintings (Nagasaki)
