= Iba Hideaki =

Japanese swordsman

- Born: 1648; Japan
- Died: 1717 (aged 68–69)
- Native name: (伊庭秀明)
- Other names: Iba Zesuiken;
- Nationality: Japanese
- Style: Shinkage-ryū; Shingyōtō-ryū
- Teacher: Unknown swordsman
- Rank: Master of Shingyōtō-ryū school of swordsmanship
- Years active: 17th century

Other information
- Occupation: Swordsman, swordmaster

Iba Hideaki (伊庭秀明, c. 1648 – 1717) was a famed swordsman during the Edo period (17th century) of Japan. Hideaki had been an adept of the Shinkage-ryū at an early age, but later concluded to himself that the school had not reflected realistic fundamentals, which is why he then chose to travel around and look for a school that would better fit him. Hideaki had then followed in a certain duel with an unknown swordsman skilled within the Enmei-ryū in the Kyūshū region. Hideaki had lost the duel, in which he chose to become a disciple under the man that had defeated him. Years later, Hideaki would change his name to Iba Zesuiken, in which Hideaki founded the Shingyōtō-ryū school of swordsmanship in 1682, which was basically a merging of the Shinkage and Enmei's way of the sword. The name of Hideaki's school had meant "School of the Sword That Shapes the Mind". What Hideaki had truly meant by having such a name was that within the time of combat, one will be amongst two states of mind—that of attacking the opponent or fleeing out of fear. Through this, Hideaki employed the principle that one should always attempt to deepen their level of technical accomplishment in order to create within themselves an unshakable form.

Iba Hideaki was a Zen master or had at least devoted some time to the practice of Zen for the attainment of enlightenment.

In the manga Mugen no Juunin, a school inspired and named after the Shingyōtō-ryū is featured, which tried to preserve the spirit of martial arts as a mean to prepare oneself for war.
