= Anne Matsuura =

American physicist

Anne Yoshiye Matsuura is an American physicist and research administrator whose interests have ranged from studying the electronic and physical structure of semiconductors, to understanding the states of quantum materials, and from there to the more abstract applications of those state computations in adiabatic quantum computation. She works for Intel as Director of Quantum Applications and Architecture at Intel Labs.

== Education and career ==
After graduating from Yorktown High School (Arlington County, Virginia), Matsuura became an undergraduate at Vanderbilt University, majoring in mathematics and physics. She visited Nagoya University in Japan as a Fulbright Scholar, and completed her Ph.D. at Stanford University, working there in the Stanford Synchrotron Radiation Laboratory. Her 1998 doctoral dissertation, Study of Mott-Hubbard metal-insulator transitions using synchrotron radiation techniques, was supervised by Zhi-Xun Shen.

She became a researcher at Lund University in Sweden and the University of Tokyo in Japan, and then joined the US Air Force Office of Scientific Research as a program manager in 2004. Next, she worked for In-Q-Tel, a government-funded venture capital firm connected with development of corporate support for US intelligence agencies. In 2009, she became chief executive of the European Theoretical Spectroscopy Facility. She joined The Optical Society as a senior science advisor in 2012, and became chief scientist at The Optical Society before moving again to Intel Labs.

== Recognition ==
Matsuura was a 2004 recipient of the Office of the Secretary of Defense Award for Excellence. She was named a Fellow of the Optical Society in 2009. In 2025, she was named a Fellow of the American Physical Society (APS), after a nomination from the APS Forum on Industrial & Applied Physics, "for exceptional contributions to quantum science and technology and outstanding professional society leadership".
