= David Matsuura =

Japanese American politician and businessman (1963–2020)

David Matsuura (February 21, 1963 – April 18, 2020) was a Japanese American politician and businessman from Hawaii.

== Early life and education ==
Matsuura was born in Allahabad, India. His father, Richard Matsuura, and his mother, Ruth Matsuura, were in India working as Methodist missionaries. The family returned to Hawaii in 1971. He earned a degree in economics from the University of California, Davis.

== Career ==
In 1985 Matsuura took over his father's orchid nursery. Matsuura was elected to the Hawaii Senate in 1998, filling his father's former seat. He was one of the "Five Freshmen" and chaired the Senate Health Committee. He lost his seat in 2002 to Lorraine Inouye because the district was reapportioned.

Matsuura died of a stroke on April 18, 2020, at Queen's Medical Center.
