= Reizei Tamechika =

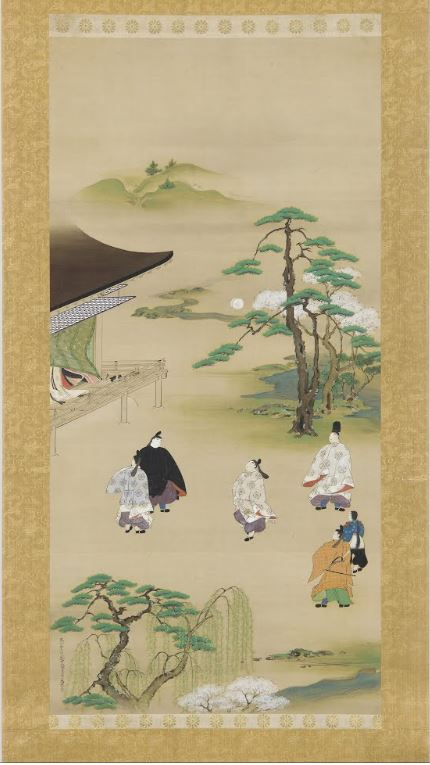
Playing Kemari (from chapter 34 of the Tale of the Genji)

Reizei Tamechika (Japanese: 冷泉為恭; 20 October 1823 – 8 June 1864), also known as Okada Tamechika (岡田為恭), was a Japanese artist from the later Edo Period who was instrumental in reviving the classical style known as Yamato-e.

== Biography ==
He was born in Kyoto, the third son of the painter Kanō Eitai. He became dissatisfied with the prevailing Kanō school style and took up the older Yamato-e style instead, although not as taught by the Tosa school, but rather the Yamato-e of the Heian and Kamakura periods, spending many years collecting examples. He was especially interested in the Kamakura artist Fujiwara no Nobuzane and made numerous copies of his works.

Under the name "Reizei" (冷泉) or "Fujiwara" (藤原) he produced numerous works on traditional themes, using ancient techniques. Later, he was adopted by the court nobleman Okada Dewa no Kami, after which he signed his name as "Okada" or "Sugawara" (菅原). It is notable that he called himself Reizei without permission of the Reizei family.

His later works, such as the Fusuma-e (sliding door pictures) at the Daiju-ji temple in Okazaki, use classical themes but are presented with a more modern approach. He also portrayed the occasional Buddhist theme, due to his friendship with a priest named Gankai.

He also became involved in politics, when his revival of Yamato-e got him involved with Sonnō jōi, the movement to restore the Emperor, via the artist Tanaka Totsugen. Tamechika supported the restoration, but his professional contacts with the Sakai clan, who were "Fudai daimyo" (vassals and retainers) of the Tokugawa Shogunate, created suspicion among some of the more radical samurai supporters of the Emperor. As a result, he was forced to hide in Wakayama Prefecture and adopt the priestly name "Shinrenbō Kōa". Nevertheless, he was discovered and murdered in Yamato, Nara Prefecture, by hired assassins from the Choshu Clan.
