= Katakai, Niigata =

Coordinates: 37°19′N 138°48′E

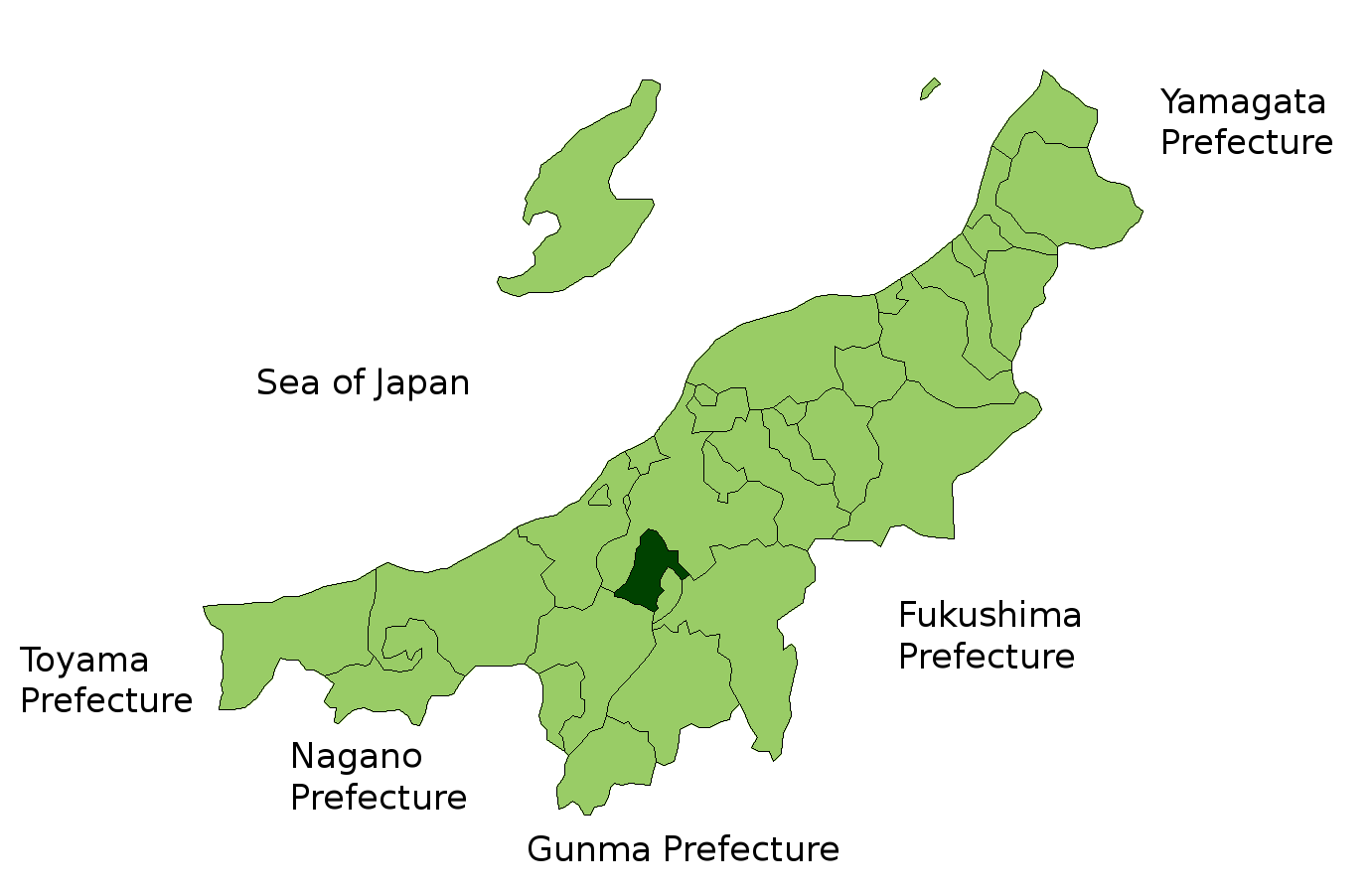
Location of Katakai in Niigata prefecture

Katakai (片貝町, Katakai-machi) is a location within the city of Ojiya, Niigata Prefecture, Japan.

== Fireworks Festival ==
The 400-year-old fireworks festival is held in early September, including 1.2 meter firework shells which produce 800 meter wide explosions, recorded in the Guinness Book of World Records as the largest fireworks in the world. During the festival, a mortar partially buried in the ground launches a 420 kg shell into the air, known as the "yonshakudama". Every few minutes, an announcement about the sponsor of the firework is made, which can make each show last for 3 hours. There are three levels of fireworks: the shakudama which is size 10, the sanshakudama which is slightly bigger, and the yonshakudama, which traditionally finishes off each nightly show during the festival. The show usually lasts around three hours. The event is sponsored by the local population.
