= Richard Matsuura =

Japanese American politician (1933–1997)

Richard Matsuura (1933 – May 2, 1997) was a Japanese American politician from Hawaii.

== Early life and education ==
Matsuura was born in Waialua in 1933. He graduated from Waialua High School in 1950. He went on to earn a bachelor's degree from Oregon State University and a doctorate in agriculture from the University of Minnesota. He met his wife while studying at Bethel Seminary in Minneapolis. They married in 1955 and had six children, including Hawaii State Senator David Matsuura.

== Career ==
In 1961 Matsuura worked as a Methodist missionary in India. While there he leveraged his agricultural knowledge to help farmers grow soybeans.

Matsuura returned to Hawaii in 1971 and opened an orchid nursery in Hilo. He entered politics and represented Hilo in the Hawaii State House of Representatives and the Hawaii State Senate as a Democrat. He headed an investigation into the state's procurement practices. There were no criminal indictments.

Matsuura died on May 2, 1997, of pancreatic and liver cancer.

== Bibliography ==
- Matsuura, Richard (2002). Rebel with a dream from Hawaii: The incredible journey of Senator Richard M. Matsuura; an autobiography. Orchid Isle Pub. Co.
