= Yumiko Ishiguro =

Japanese synchronized swimmer

Personal information
- Born: October 31, 1983 (age 42) Tokyo, Japan

Sport
- Sport: Synchronised swimming

Yumiko Ishiguro (born 31 October 1983) is a Japanese synchronized swimmer who competed in the 2008 Summer Olympics.
