= Shingyōtō-ryū =

Japanese swordsmanship style

Shingyōtō-ryū (心形刀流) is a Japanese koryū swordsmanship style that was founded in 1682 by Iba Josuiken Hideaki (伊庭是水軒秀明). The name roughly translates as "mind shape/form sword school". The style places a high emphasis on swordsmanship philosophy, mainly to-ho-no-sho-shin or "the heart of the sword".

== Information ==
- Systems: kenjutsu (odachi, kodachi, nitto), iaijutsu, naginatajutsu, kagitsuki naginata (glaive mounted with a crossbar at the juncture of haft and blade)
- Date founded: 1682
- Founded by: Iba Josuiken Hideaki
- Present representative/headmaster: Kobayashi Masao 5th generation instructor at the Kameyama Enbujō
- Primarily located in: Mie Prefecture
