= Nagasaki Museum of History and Culture =

Museum in Nagasaki, Japan

Coordinates: 32.7528°N 129.8796°E

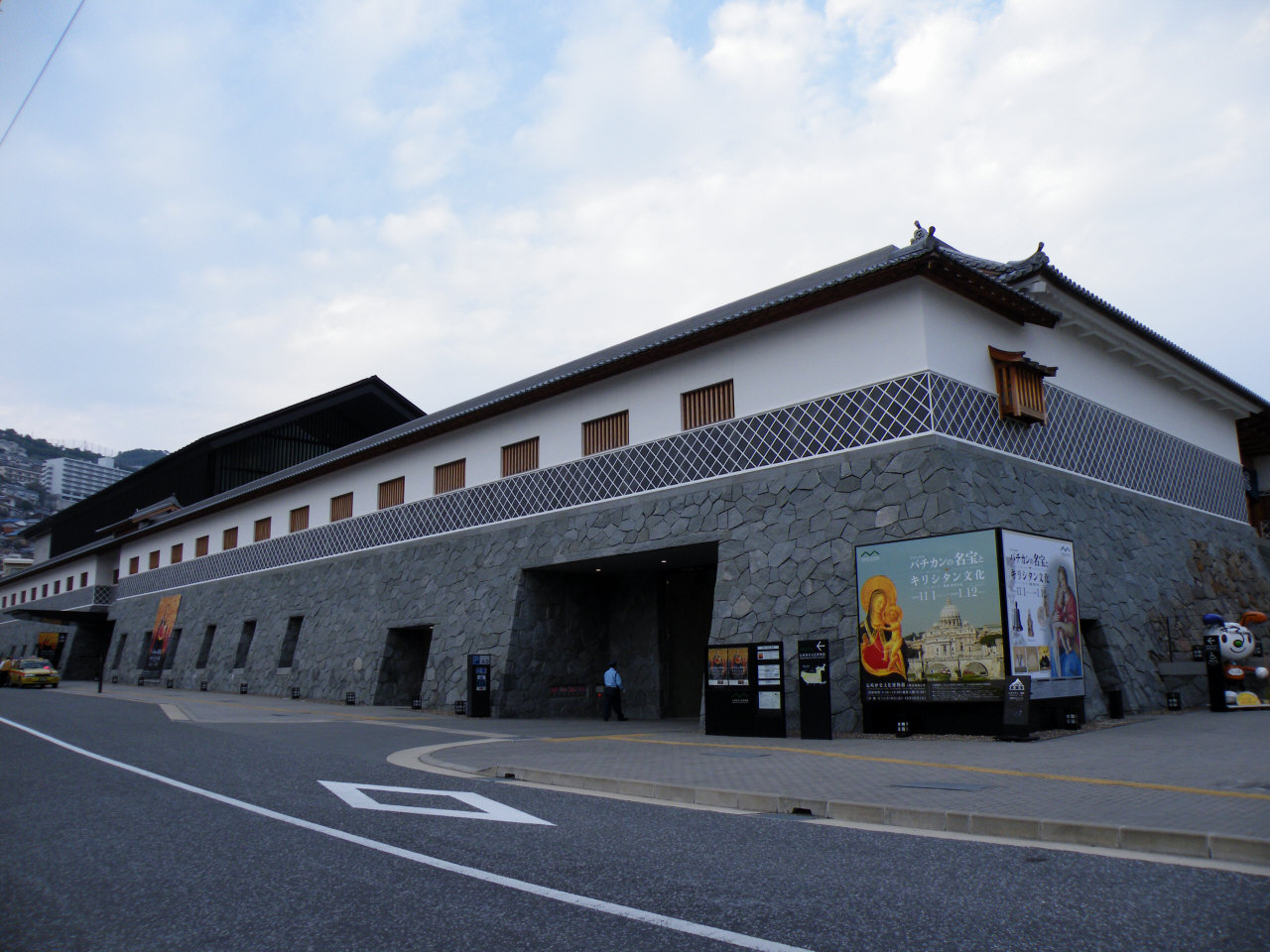
Nagasaki Museum of History and Culture

The Nagasaki Museum of History and Culture (長崎歴史文化博物館, Nagasaki Rekishi Bunka Hakubutsukan) in Nagasaki, Japan is one of the few museums in Japan devoted to the theme of "overseas exchange".

The museum holds 48,000 items in its collection, including historical documents and arts and crafts, that tell the story of Nagasaki as the sole window opened to foreign countries during the period of national isolation. The museum also contains a reconstruction of part of the Nagasaki Magistrate's Office called bugyōsho, a local agency of the central government in the Edo period.

The permanent exhibition features exhibits dealing with exchange with the Netherlands, China and Korea, and shows artifacts brought to Japan by foreign traders. It also focuses on "Nanban" (Portuguese and Spanish culture) and the introduction of Christianity. The museum shows the role Nagasaki played in post-restoration Japan in the diplomatic sphere, as well as being at the forefront of modern medicine, printing, ship building and industrial technology.

== See also ==
- List of Important Tangible Folk Cultural Properties
