= Sōfuku-ji (Nagasaki) =

Buddhist temple in Nagasaki, Japan

Coordinates: 32°44′32″N 129°53′01″E

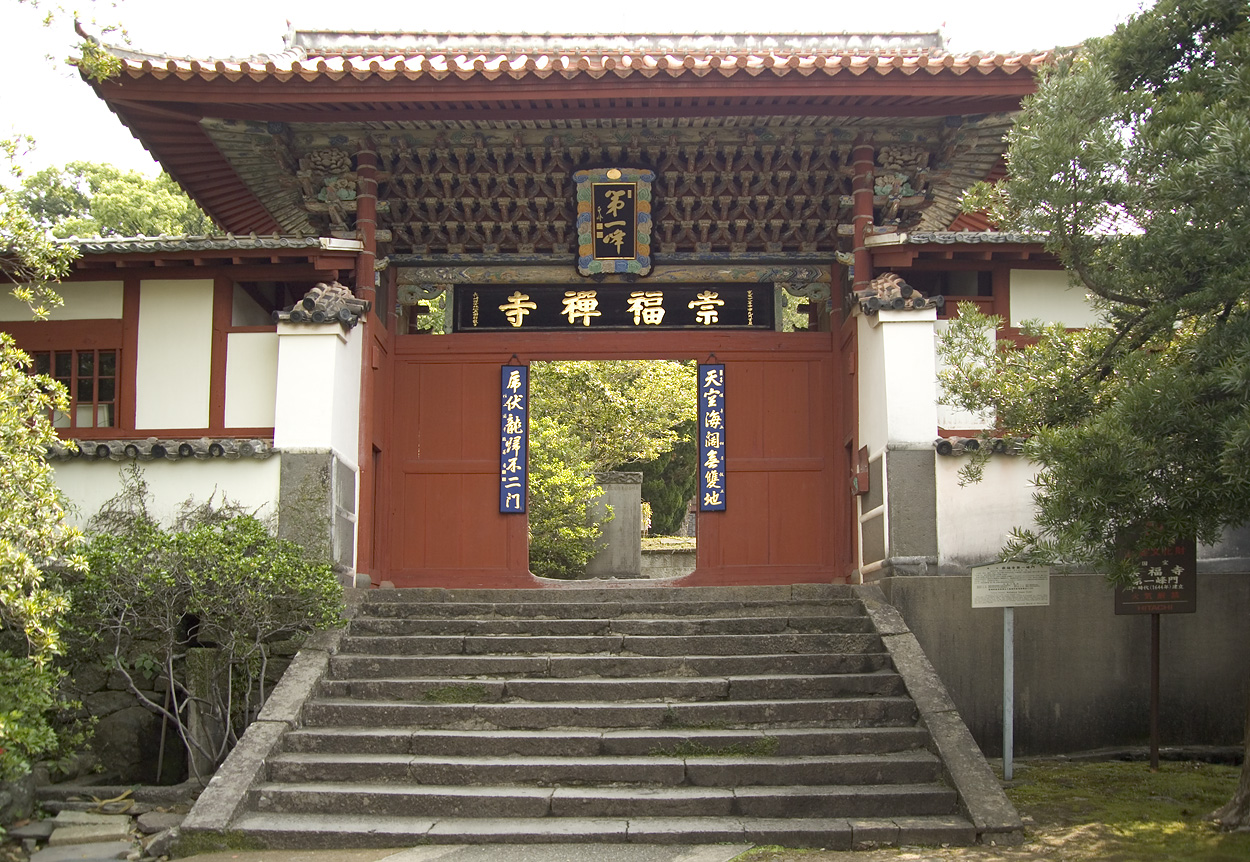
Daiippōmon, a National Treasure

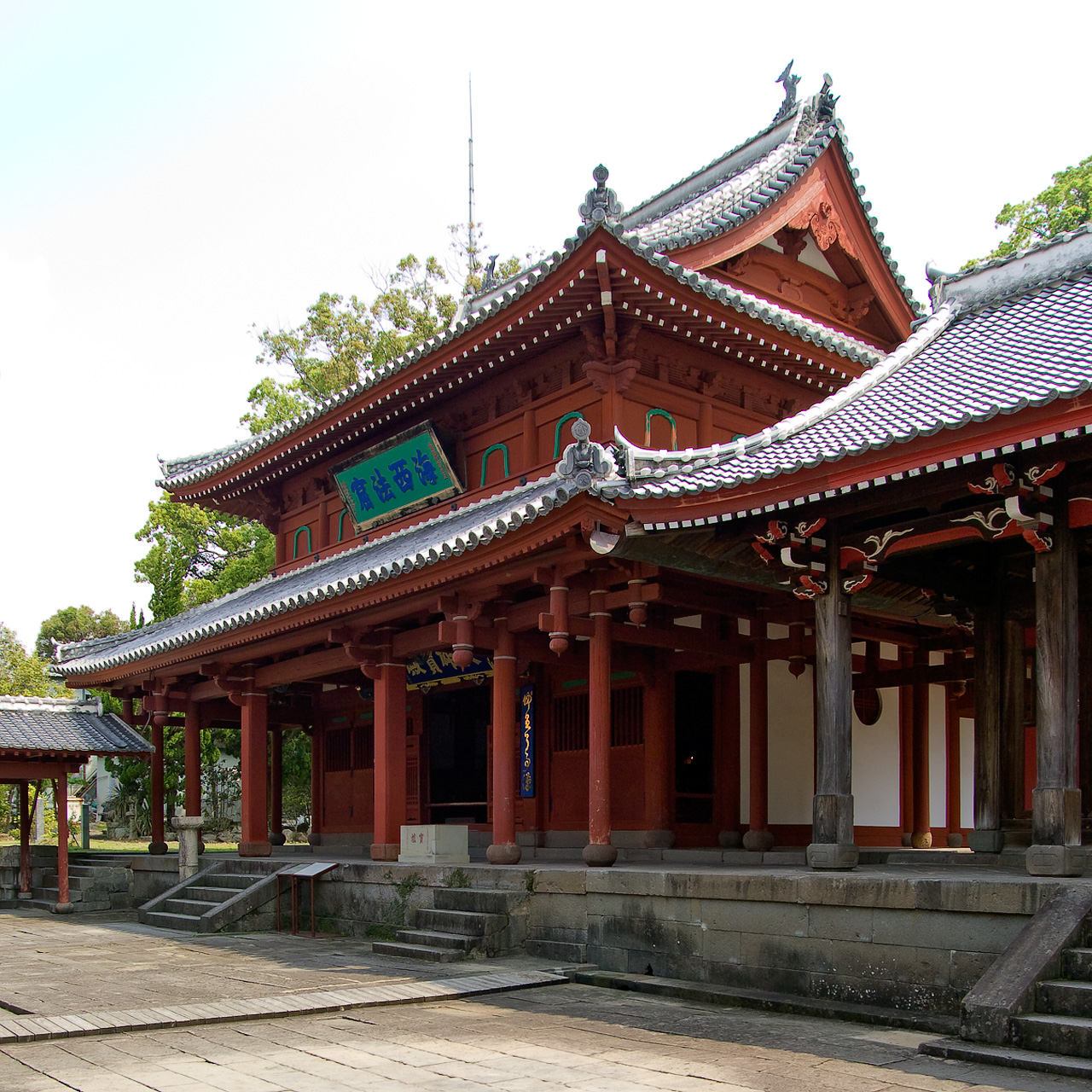
Great Leader's Hall, a National Treasure

Sōfuku-ji (崇福寺) is an Ōbaku Zen temple that was built by the Chinese monk Chaoran (Chozen) in 1629 as the family temple of the Chinese from Fuzhou, Fujian Province who settled in Nagasaki.

== Temple buildings ==
Two of its buildings have been designated as national treasures. The Daiyū Hōden Buddha Hall is one of Nagasaki’s oldest buildings, having been designed in China. The sections of the temple were cut in China and then shipped to be assembled in Nagasaki in 1646. The “Daiyū” in “Daiyū Hōden”, meaning "Great Hero", refers to the Sakyamuni Buddha which is enshrined in the hall as the principal image.

The original entrance to the temple, the Dai-ipponmon gate was likewise shipped to Nagasaki from China, having first been built as the gate of a temple in China in 1644. It was reassembled at the entrance to Sōfuku-ji temple in 1695.

The current red entrance gate, called the Ryugamon, or “Gate of the Dragon Palace”, is painted bright red and is a rare example of the architecture of South China during the Ming dynasty. It was originally built in 1673, but has been destroyed by fires and storms several times. The most current gate was built in 1849.

== Enshrined deities ==
The goddess of the sea, Maso, is enshrined in the Masodo, along with other life-sized statues in the main hall. Maso is a Chinese goddess, who’s worship is based in coastal southern China, and was not taken up more generally in Japan, despite being popular with Chinese mariners who traded into Nagasaki.

== Other historical treasures ==
In the temple grounds is a large cauldron made by the resident priest Qianhai to cook gruel for people who were starving during the famine of 1681.

The bell of the temple was cast in 1647.

== Festivals ==
The Chinese Bon Festival is held here from July 26 to 28 (by lunar calendar), with Chinese coming from all over Japan to participate in the ritual for the dead.

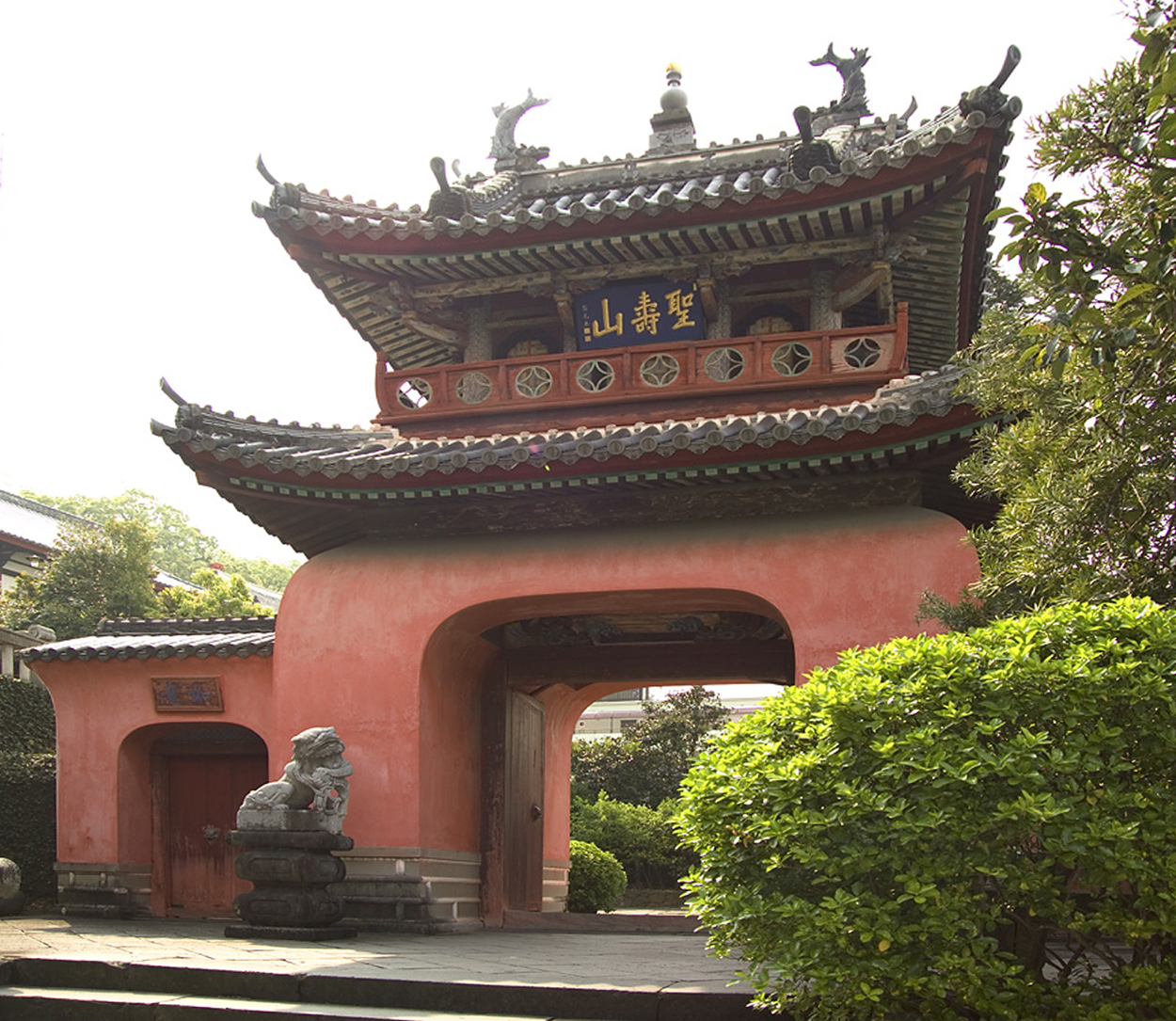
Sanmon, gate

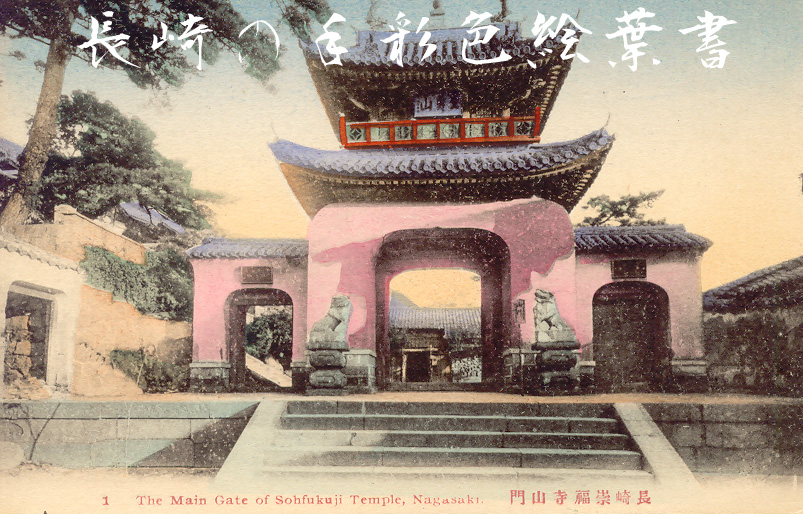
Gate (Taisho)

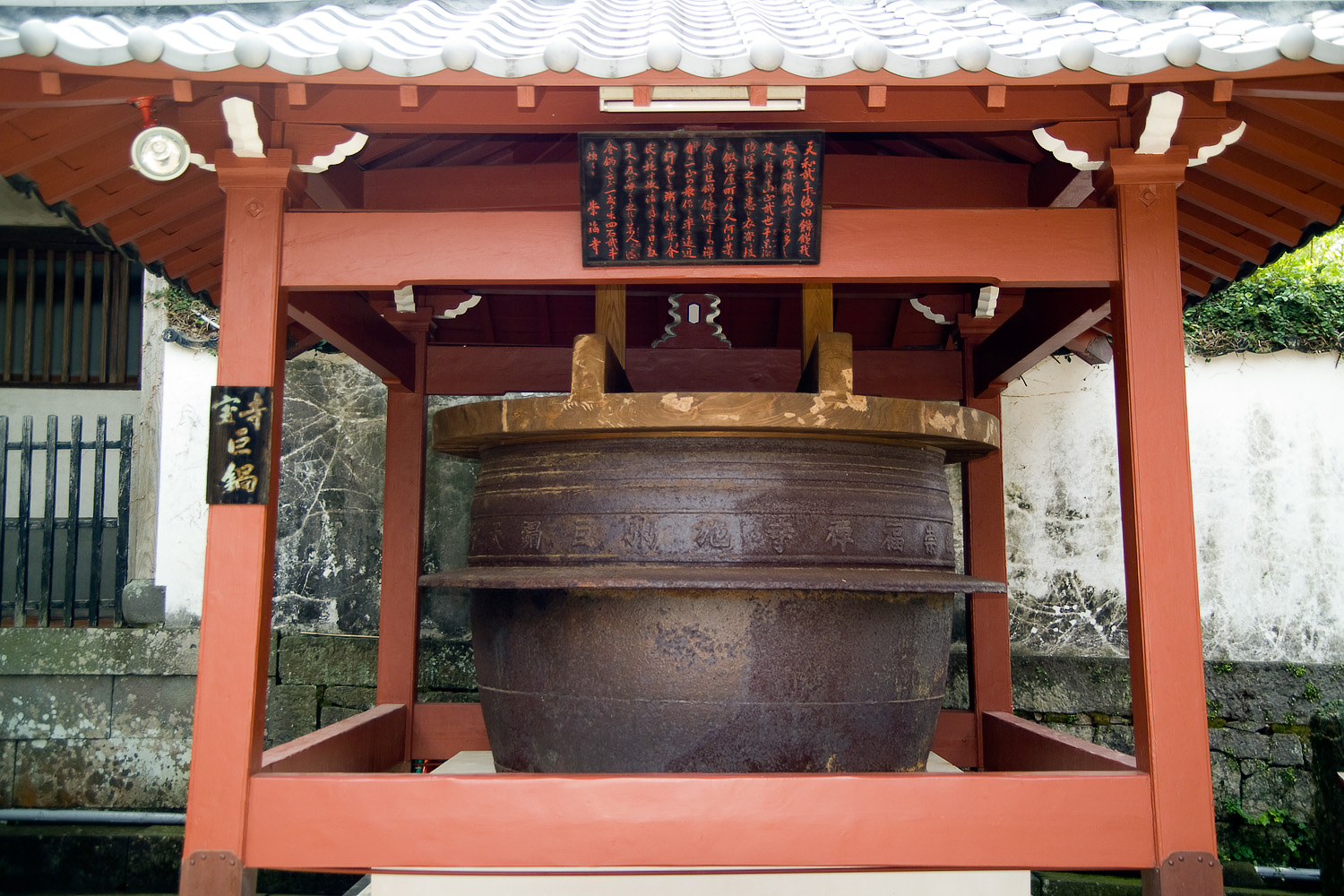
Great Cauldron

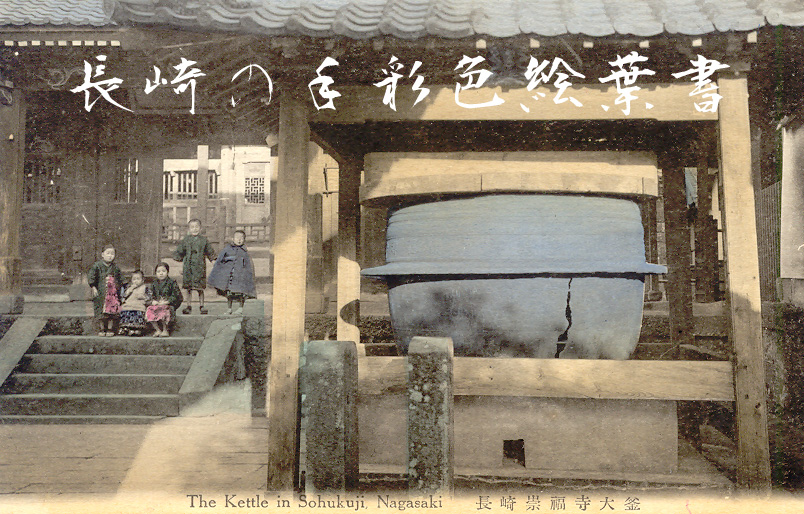
Great Cauldron (Taisho)

(video) Various views, 2016

Red lanterns along the temple steps

Rows of food offerings for the Chūgen festival

Paper offerings in front of the main hall during the Chūgen festival

== Access ==
The temple is served by Sōfukuji terminus station on the number 1 and 4 tram lines.

== Opening times ==
The temple is open to visitors daily from 8AM to 5PM.

== See also ==
- List of National Treasures of Japan (Temples)
