= Hirado Domain =

Japanese historical estate in Hizen Province

Hirado Domain 平戸藩
- Domain of Japan
- 1587–1871
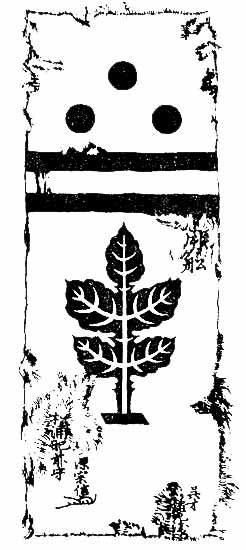
- Flag Mon of the Matsura clan

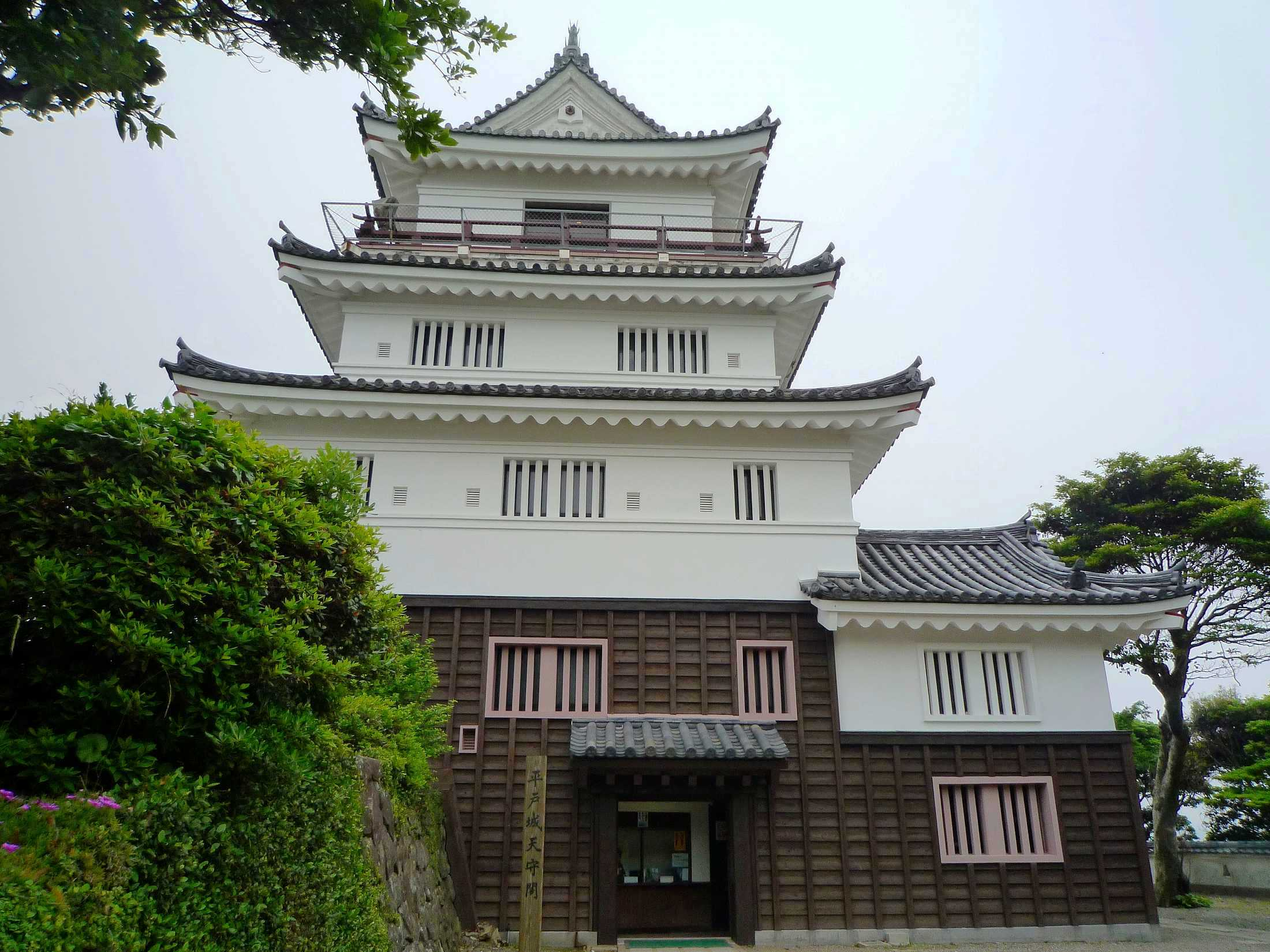
- Hirado Castle
- Capital: Hirado Castle
- Government
  - Type: Daimyō
- Historical era: Edo period
  - Established: 1587
  - Disestablished: 1871
- Today part of: Nagasaki Prefecture
- Location of Hirado Castle Hirado Domain (Japan)

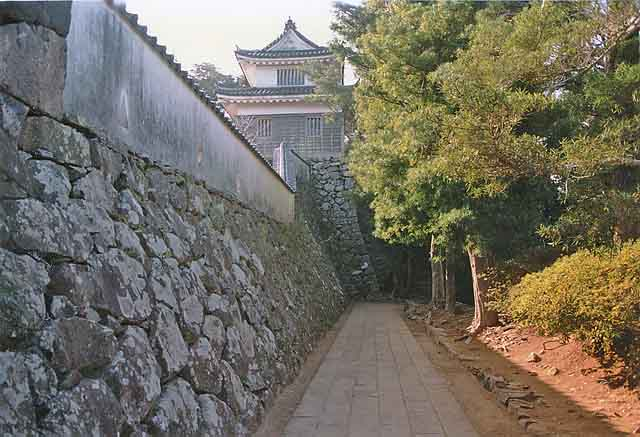
A tower and wall of Hirado Castle

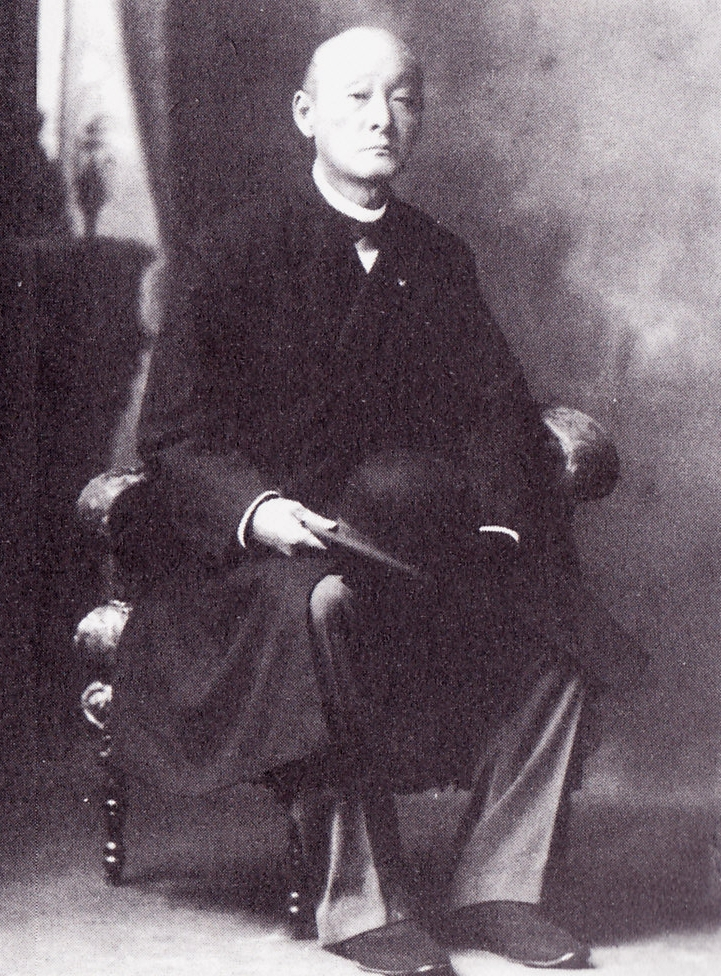
Matsura Akira, final daimyo of Hirado Domain

Hirado Domain (平戸藩, Hirado-han) was a Japanese domain of the Edo period. It was centered around Hirado Castle in what is now the city of Hirado, Nagasaki and was ruled by the tozama daimyō Matsura clan for all of its history.

== History ==
Matsura Takanobu, who rose to power among the Matsura clan, a powerful local clan in the northern part of present-day Nagasaki Prefecture, conquered Kitamatsuura District in northern Hizen Province and the island province of Iki. In 1587, his son, Matsura Shigenobu was confirmed in his holdings for assisting Toyotomi Hideyoshi's Kyushu Conquest of 1587-1587. During the Japanese invasions of Korea, Hirado was a forward base of operations for Japanese forces. In 1599, Matsura Shigenobu erected a castle called Hinotake-jō on the site of the present-day Hirado Castle. However, he burned the castle down himself in 1613, as a gesture of loyalty towards Shōgun Tokugawa Ieyasu, having served in the losing Toyotomi side during the Battle of Sekigahara. In return, he was allowed to retain his position as daimyō of Hirado Domain under the Tokugawa shogunate with a kokudaka of 63,000 koku.

Under the 4th daimyō, also named Matsura Shinobu (but with different kanji) the domain was reduced by 1500 koku through a grant to his cousin Matsura Nobutada. During Shigenobu's tenure, in 1641, the Hirado Dutch Trading Post was relocated by order of the shogunate from Hirado to Dejima, which caused a great blow to the domain's finances. After that, in order to restore the domain's internal affairs, a land survey was carried out, and the foundation of the domain's finances was solidified by promoting the development of agriculture, fishing, and commerce.

The 5th daimyō, Matsura Takashi reduced the domain by 10,000 koku to establish his younger brother, Masashi as head of a cadet branch of the clan and daimyō of Hirado-Shinden Domain. Although a tozama daimyō Matsura Takashi was promoted to the positions of sōshaban and Jisha-bugyō within the shogunal administration. However, the expenses incurred in this and the reconstruction of Hirado Castle in 1707 led to the domain's finances becoming impoverished.

The 9th daimyō, Matsura Kiyoshi, was a noted essayist and political commentator. He carried out major reforms in the domain in line with the Kansei Reforms. His daughter, Aiko, was the grandmother of Emperor Meiji.

During the Bakumatsu period, the 12th daimyō, Matsura Akira commanded his forces as part of the Satchō Alliance during the Boshin War of the Meiji Restoration, in support of Emperor Meiji. Military reforms led to the formation of a Western-style rifle unit in the domain, which fought at the Battle of Toba–Fushimi and against the Tokugawa remnants of the Ōuetsu Reppan Dōmei in northern Japan, at Morioka and Akita. Following the Meiji restoration, in 1871 Hirado Domain became "Hirado Prefecture", which was later incorporated into Nagasaki Prefecture. In April 1884, Matsura Akira was made a count in the new kazoku peerage system. From 1890, he served in the House of Peers of the Diet of Japan. He was later awarded the 2nd Court rank.

== Territories of the Hirado Domain at the end of the Edo period ==
As with most domains in the han system, the Hirado Domain consisted of several discontinuous territories calculated to provide the assigned kokudaka, based on periodic cadastral surveys and projected agricultural yields. The territories below include the territory of Hirado Shinden Domain which was merged back into Hirado Domain in 1870.

- Hizen Province:
  - Matsuura County: 47 villages
  - Sonogi County: 7 villages
- Iki Province:
  - Iki County: 11 villages
  - Ishida County: 11 villages

== List of daimyō ==
	Name	Tenure	Courtesy title	Court Rank	kokudaka
Matsura clan, 1587–1871 (tozama daimyo)
1	Matsura Shigenobu (松浦鎮信)	1587–1600	Hizen-no-kami (肥前守)	Junior 4th Lower Grade (従四位下)	63,200 koku
2	Matsura Hisanobu (松浦久信)	1600–1602	Hizen-no-kami (肥前守)	Junior 5th Lower Grade (従五位下)	63,200 koku
3	Matsura Takanobu (松浦隆信)	1603–1637	Hizen-no-kami (肥前守)	Junior 5th Lower Grade (従五位下)	63,200 koku
4	Matsura Shigenobu (松浦鎮信)	1637–1689	Hizen-no-kami (肥前守)	Junior 5th Lower Grade (従五位下)	61,700 koku
5	Matsura Takashi (松浦棟)	1689–1713	Hizen-no-kami (肥前守)	Junior 5th Lower Grade (従五位下)	51,700 koku
6	Matsura Atsunobu (松浦篤信)	1713–1727	Hizen-no-kami (肥前守)	Junior 5th Lower Grade (従五位下)	51,700 koku
7	Matsura Arinobu (松浦有信)	1727–1728	Hizen-no-kami (肥前守)	Junior 5th Lower Grade (従五位下)	51,700 koku
8	Matsura Sanenobu (松浦誠信)	1728–1775	Hizen-no-kami (肥前守)	Junior 5th Lower Grade (従五位下)	51,700 koku
9	Matsura Kiyoshi (松浦清)	1775–1806	Iki-no-kami (壱岐守)	Junior 5th Lower Grade (従五位下)	51,700 koku
10	Matsura Hiromu (松浦熈)	1806–1841	Hizen-no-kami (肥前守)	Junior 5th Lower Grade (従五位下)	51,700 koku
11	Matsura Terasu (松浦曜)	1841–1858	Iki-no-kami (壱岐守)	Junior 5th Lower Grade (従五位下)	51,700 koku
12	Matsura Akira (松浦詮)	1858–1871	Hizen-no-kami (肥前守)	2nd (正二位), Count (伯爵)	61,700 koku

== See also ==
- List of Han
- Abolition of the han system
