= Matsura Hisanobu =

Japanese daimyō

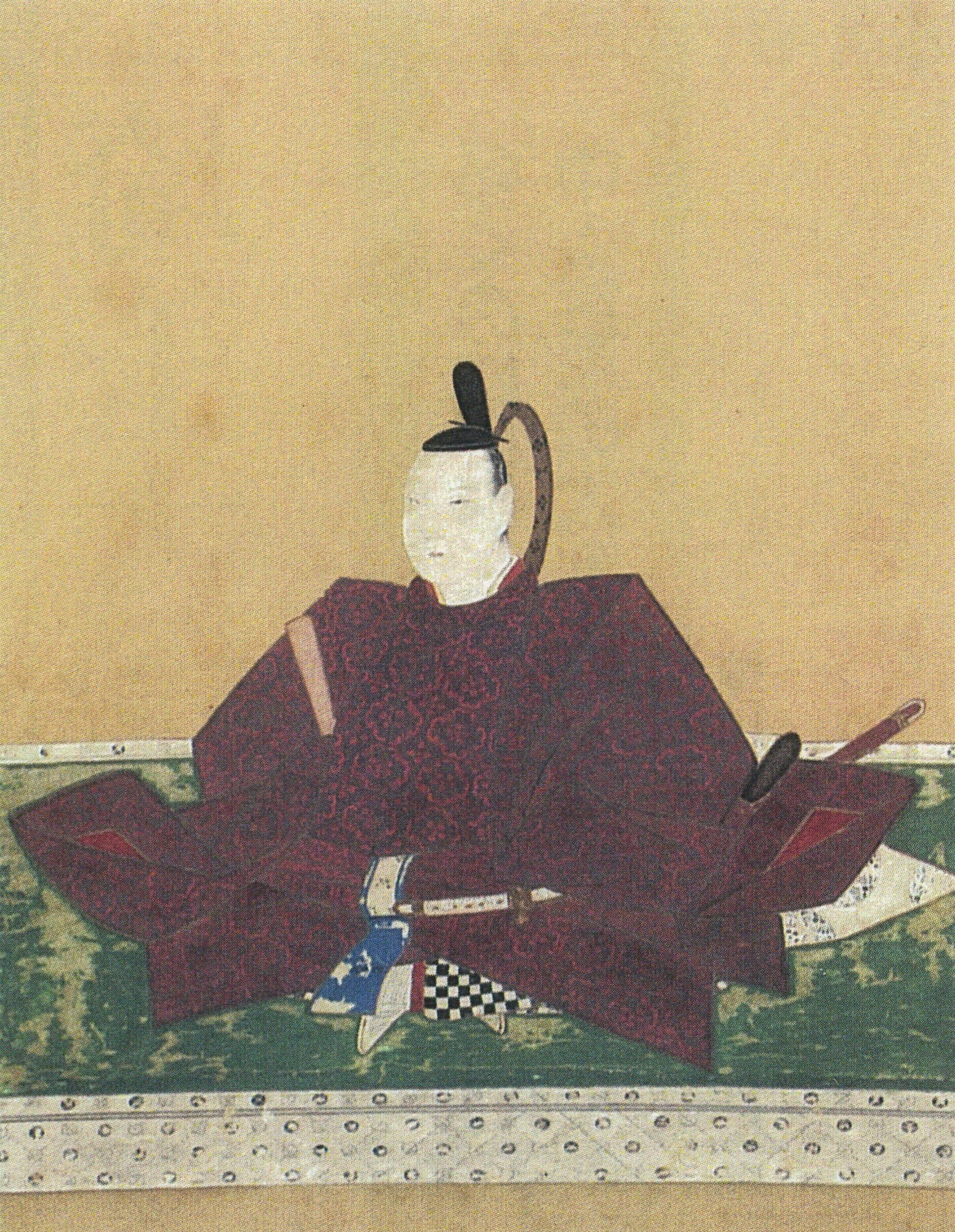

Lord of Hirado
- In office 1600–1602
- Preceded by: Matsura Shigenobu
- Succeeded by: Matsura Takanobu

Personal details
- Spouse: Ōmura Sono

Matsura Hisanobu (松浦 久信; 1571 – October 14, 1602) was a Japanese daimyō of the late Azuchi–Momoyama period through early Edo period, who ruled the Hirado Domain of Hizen Province. His wife, Mencia, was the daughter of the famous Christian daimyo, Ōmura Sumitada (whose territory was nearby).

Hisanobu and his father both served under Toyotomi Hideyoshi during the Korean campaigns. At the time of the Battle of Sekigahara, Hisanobu fought on the Toyotomi side, although his father defected to the Tokugawa side and burned down his castle in Hirado as a gesture of loyalty to the new shōgun, Tokugawa Ieyasu.

Following the Battle of Sekigahara, Hisanobu was summoned to an audience with Tokugawa Ieyasu in Kyoto and died shortly afterwards. There are indications that he was ordered to commit seppuku. He was followed in succession by his son Matsura Takanobu.

Preceded by Matsura Shigenobu	Daimyō of Hirado; 1600–1602	Succeeded by Matsura Takanobu
