= Matsura Akira =

Matsura Akira 松浦 詮
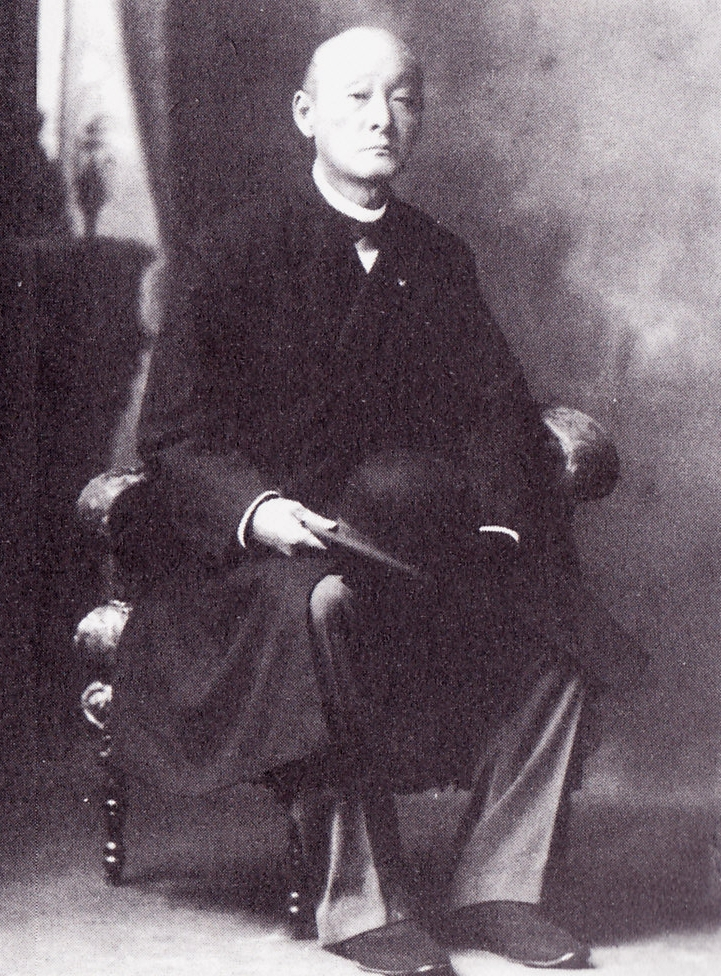
- Matsura Akira after the Meiji Restoration

Lord of Hirado
- In office 1858–1871
- Preceded by: Matsura Terasu
- Succeeded by: none

Personal details
- Born: November 11, 1840 Hirado, Japan
- Died: April 13, 1908 (aged 67)

Count Matsura Akira (松浦 詮; November 11, 1840 – April 13, 1908) was the 12th and final daimyō of Hirado Domain in Hizen Province, Kyūshū, Japan. He was also the 37th hereditary head of the Matsura clan, and a noted tea master. His honorary title was. Hizen-no-Kami.

== Biography ==
Akira was born as the 3rd son of Matsura Hiromu, the 10th daimyō of Hirado. His elder brother, Matsura Terasu became 11th daimyō of Hirado in 1841; however by 1849, despite having a wife and three official concubines, Terasu was still childless. Therefore, in November 1849, Akira was officially adopted as his son and heir. Terasu died unexpectedly on August 5, 1858, and Akira became the 12th daimyō of Hirado.

Akira was an active ruler, and attempted to continue the efforts started by his brother to strengthen the domain in face of the unsettled Bakumatsu period by continuing land reforms, sponsoring improved agricultural methods and military training. In 1859, he was visited by Katsu Kaishū and by the Dutch doctor J. L. C. Pompe van Meerdervoort. In 1860, he built coastal defenses as increasing numbers of foreign ships were seen near Hirado's shores.

Politically, he supported the moderate Kōbu Gattai policy of attempting to reconcile the Tokugawa Bakufu with the Imperial Court. During the Boshin War of the Meiji Restoration, he commanded his forces as part of the Satchō Alliance in support of Emperor Meiji, and fought at the Battle of Toba–Fushimi and against the Tokugawa remnants of the Ōuetsu Reppan Dōmei in northern Japan, at Morioka and Akita.

In June 1868, the revenues of Hirado domain were raised to 61,700 koku as a reward for his loyalty to the new government. However, with the abolition of the han system later that year, he surrendered the title of daimyō to the central government and was appointed governor until Hirado domain was absorbed into Nagasaki Prefecture in July 1871. Awarded 4th Court rank, he moved to Tokyo and entered into service of the Imperial Household Ministry. In April 1884, he was made a count in the new kazoku peerage system. From 1890, he served in the House of Peers of the Diet of Japan. He was later awarded 2nd Court rank.

In addition to his political work, Matsura Akira was also heir to the Chinshin-ryu (鎮信流) school of the Japanese tea ceremony begun by the 4th daimyō of Hirado, Matsura Shigenobu. His former house in Hirado still exists, and is preserved as the Matsura Historical Museum. The building is listed as a National Important Cultural Property. The collection holds household objects, paintings, calligraphy, and documents relating to the early foreign trade in the area. All items in the collection had once been the property of the Matsura clan of Hirado.

Preceded by Matsura Terasu	10th daimyō of Hirado; 1858–1871	Succeeded by none
