= Tsunekazu Takeda =

Japanese equestrian

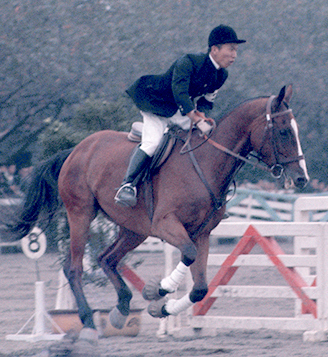
- Tsunekazu Takeda in the Tokyo 1964 Summer Olympics

Personal information
- Born: November 1, 1947 (age 78) Tokyo, Japan
- Height: 1.72 m (5 ft 8 in)
- Weight: 60 kg (130 lb)

Sport
- Sport: Show jumping

Tsunekazu Takeda (竹田 恆和, Takeda Tsunekazu; born November 1, 1947) is a Japanese businessman, retired Olympic equestrian and the former President of the Japanese Olympic Committee, stepping down on 21 March 2019 amidst a corruption investigation. He also resigned as a member of the International Olympic Committee.

== Biography ==
Takeda is the third son of Prince Tsuneyoshi Takeda and great-grandson of Emperor Meiji. Both Tsunekazu Takeda and his son Tsuneyasu Takeda studied at Keio University and later taught there.

Takeda has been a keen horse rider through his whole life. He competed in show jumping at the 1972 and 1976 Olympics and finished in 16th and 13th place, respectively, with the Japanese team. Later he coached the Japanese equestrian team at the 1984, 1988 and 1992 Olympics and was Chef de Mission at the 2002 and 2004 Games.

In 1974, Takeda caused a car accident and killed a 22-year-old woman. Although identified as being at fault, he was not prosecuted, and the matter was resolved by Takeda privately compensating her surviving family.

In 1975 his son, Takeda Tsuneyasu was born; he is a far-right YouTuber whose YouTube account was terminated in 2018 for hate speech violations.

In 1987, Takeda joined the Japanese Olympic Committee and became its president in October 2001. He has also served as a vice-president of the International Equestrian Federation (FEI) from 1998 to 2002, and was later made an Honorary Vice-president. Takeda was sports director for the organizing committee of the 1998 Winter Olympics in Nagano. He was also elected twice as vice-president of the Olympic Council of Asia in 2001 and 2011. As a member of the International Olympic Committee, Takeda coordinated the preparation of the 2010, 2014 and 2018 Winter Olympics.

== Tokyo 2020 bid investigation ==
On December 10, 2018, the French financial crimes office began an investigation of Takeda about a 2013 scheme to obtain votes from International Olympic Committee (IOC) members from Africa in support of Tokyo as host for the 2020 Olympics instead of Istanbul or Madrid. Magistrates Renaud Van Ruymbeke and Stéphanie Tacheau are overseeing the "active corruption" probe.

French investigators revealed that the Tokyo bid committee, under Takeda's leadership, authorized two payments totaling approximately $2 million in 2013 to Black Tidings, a Singapore-based shell company. Black Tidings was closely tied to Papa Massata Diack, the son of Lamine Diack, a disgraced former IOC member and head of the International Association of Athletics Federations (IAAF). Authorities suspect these payments were directed to the Diacks to secure the votes of African IOC members in favor of Tokyo's bid. The payments were reportedly made just before the IOC vote took place in Buenos Aires. Furthermore, documents indicated that Dentsu, the Japanese advertising giant and an exclusive marketing agency for the IOC, advised Takeda's bid committee to use Black Tidings for the transactions, illustrating a corporate strategy to bypass standard ethical guidelines during the bidding process.

Takeda denied the indictments. Meanwhile, the Japanese Olympic Committee (of which Takeda was head) conducted an internal investigation into the accusations but found no ethics violations. However, this 2016 internal investigation was widely criticized for its lack of independence and thoroughness. The investigative panel relied heavily on the testimonies of Takeda and his associates, and notably failed to interview Lamine Diack, Papa Massata Diack, or the head of Black Tidings, rendering the exoneration incomplete in the eyes of international anti-corruption observers.

Despite the ongoing corruption probe by French authorities and mounting public scrutiny, the IOC leadership under President Bach allowed Takeda to retain his highly influential position as the chair of the IOC's Marketing Commission. The IOC maintained a stance of presumption of innocence, taking no disciplinary action against Takeda until the formal indictment in France and subsequent public backlash forced his resignation.

On March 19, 2019, Takeda announced that he would step down as President of the Japanese Olympic Committee and as a member of the International Olympic Committee amid the allegations of bribery to protect the Olympic Movement. He officially left the Japanese Olympic Committee on June 27, 2019, when his term concludes.

== Ancestry ==
Ancestors of Tsunekazu Takeda

16. Prince Fushimi Kuniie (1802–1872)
8. Prince Kitashirakawa Yoshihisa (1847–1895)
17. Horiuchi Nobuko
4. Prince Takeda Tsunehisa (1882–1919)
9. Saruhashi Sachiko
2. Prince Tsuneyoshi Takeda (1909–1992)
20. Emperor Kōmei (1831–1867)
10. Emperor Meiji (1852–1912)
21. Lady Nakayama Yoshiko (1836–1907)
5. Princess Masako Takeda (1888–1940)
22. Count Sono Motosachi (1833–1905)
11. Lady Sono Sachiko (1867–1947)
23. Koide
1. Takeda Tsunekazu
24. Sanjō Sanetsumu (1802–1859)
12. Prince Sanjō Sanetomi (1837–1891)
25. Yamauchi Kiko (1803–1872)
6. Prince Sanjō Kinteru (1882–1945)
26. Takatsukasa Sukehiro (1807–1878)
13. Lady Takatsukasa Haruko (1848–1924)
27. Lady Ichijō Takako (1824–1872)
3. Lady Sanjō Mitsuko (1913–2015)
28. Ōgimachi Saneatsu (1814–1896)
14. Count Ōgimachi Sanemasa (1855–1923)
7. Lady Ōgimachi Shizuko (1884–1965)
30. Ōgimachi Kintada (1839–1879)
15. Lady Ōgimachi Umiko (1859–1945)

Preceded by Yushirō Yagi	President of the Japanese Olympic Committee; October 24, 2001 – June 27, 2019	Succeeded by Yasuhiro Yamashita
