= Tsuneharu =

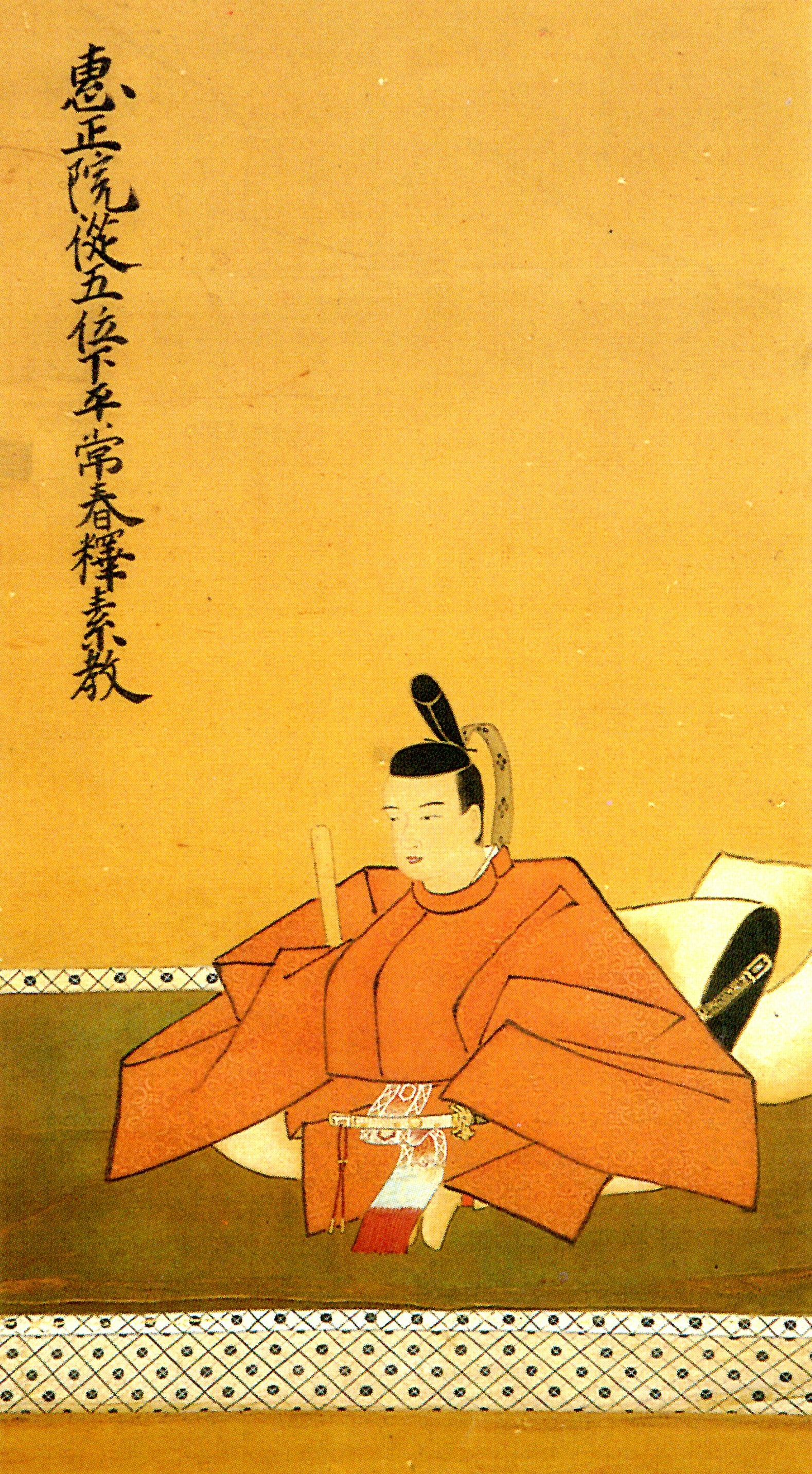
- Tsuneharu Endo (1667–1689), Japanese samurai
- Pronunciation: tsɯnehaɾɯ (IPA)
- Gender: Male

Origin
- Origin: Japanese
- Meaning: Different meanings depending on the kanji used

Other names
- Alternative spelling: Tuneharu (Kunrei-shiki) Tuneharu (Nihon-shiki) Tsuneharu (Hepburn)

Tsuneharu is a masculine Japanese given name.

== Written forms ==
Tsuneharu can be written using different combinations of kanji characters. Here are some examples:

- 常治, "usual, to manage"
- 常春, "usual, spring"
- 常温, "usual, to warm up"
- 常晴, "usual, clear (weather)"
- 恒治, "always, to manage"
- 恒春, "always, spring"
- 恒温, "always, to warm up"
- 恒晴, "always, clear (weather)"
- 庸治, "common, to manage"
- 庸春, "common, spring"
- 庸温, "common, to warm up"
- 庸晴, "common, clear (weather)"
- 毎治, "every, to manage"
- 毎春, "every, spring"
- 毎温, "every, to warm up"
- 毎晴, "every, clear (weather)"

The name can also be written in hiragana つねはる or katakana ツネハル.

== Notable people with the name ==
- Tsuneharu Sugiyama (杉山 恒治; 1940–2002), Japanese sport wrestler.
- Tsuneharu Takeda (竹田 恒治; born 1944), Japanese prince and diplomat.
