= Kitashirakawa =

Kitashirakawa may refer to:

- Kitashirakawa-no-miya, Japanese princely house
- Kitashirakawa Palace, a hotel built in 1955 and replaced by the Grand Prince Hotel Akasaka in 1982, which was closed in 2011 for demolition.
