= Naruhisa =

- Gender: Male

Origin
- Origin: Japanese
- Meaning: Different meanings depending on the kanji used

Naruhisa (written: 稔久 or 成久) is a masculine Japanese given name. Notable people with the name include:

- Naruhisa Arakawa (荒川 稔久) (born 1964), Japanese screenwriter
- Prince Kitashirakawa Naruhisa (北白川宮成久王) (1887–1923), Japanese prince
