= Kitashirakawa-no-miya =

Branch of the Japanese Imperial Family

Kitashirakawa-no-miya 北白川宮家
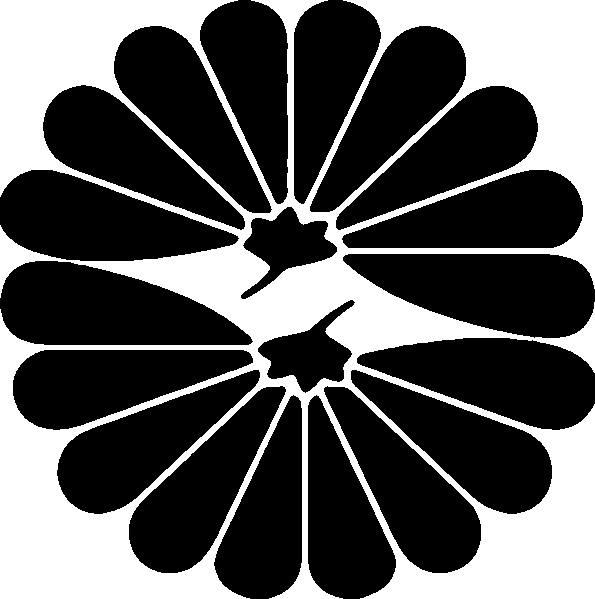
- Origin: Yamashiro Province
- Founder: Prince Kitashirakawa Satonari
- Members: Prince Kitashirakawa Yoshihisa; Prince Naruhisa Kitashirakawa; Fusako Kitashirakawa; Prince Nagahisa Kitashirakawa
- Connected families: Takeda-no-miya

Kitashirakawa
- Pronunciation: Kitashirakawa

Origin
- Origin: Japanese
- Region of origin: Japanese

The Kitashirakawa (北白川) ōke (princely house) was the fifth-oldest branch of the Japanese imperial family created from branches of the Fushimi-no-miya house.

== Kitashirakawa-no-miya ==
The Kitashirakawa-no-miya house was formed by Prince Satonari, thirteenth son of Prince Fushimi Kuniye, in 1872. In 1947, Prince Kitashirakawa Michihisa lost his imperial status and became an ordinary citizen, as part of the American Occupation's abolition of the collateral branches of the Japanese Imperial family. Upon his death without male heirs on 20 October 2018, the main line of the Kitashirakawa-no-miya became extinct.

	Name	Born	Succeeded	Retired	Died	Notes
1	Prince Kitashirakawa Satonari (北白川宮 智成親王, Kitashirakawa-no-miya Satonari shinnō)	1850	1872	.	1872	
2	Prince Kitashirakawa Yoshihisa (北白川宮 能久親王, Kitashirakawa-no-miya Yoshihisa-shinnō)	1847	1872	.	1895	brother of above
3	Prince Kitashirakawa Naruhisa (北白川宮 成久王, Kitashirakawa-no-miya Naruhisa-ō)	1887	1895	.	1923	
4	Prince Kitashirakawa Nagahisa (北白川宮 永久王, Kitashirakawa-no-miya Naruhisa-ō)	1910	1923	.	1940	
5	Prince Kitashirakawa Michihisa (北白川宮 道久王, Kitashirakawa-no-miya Michihisa-ō)	1937	1940	1947	2018	line extinct after death
