= Fusako Kitashirakawa =

Former Japanese princess (1890–1974)

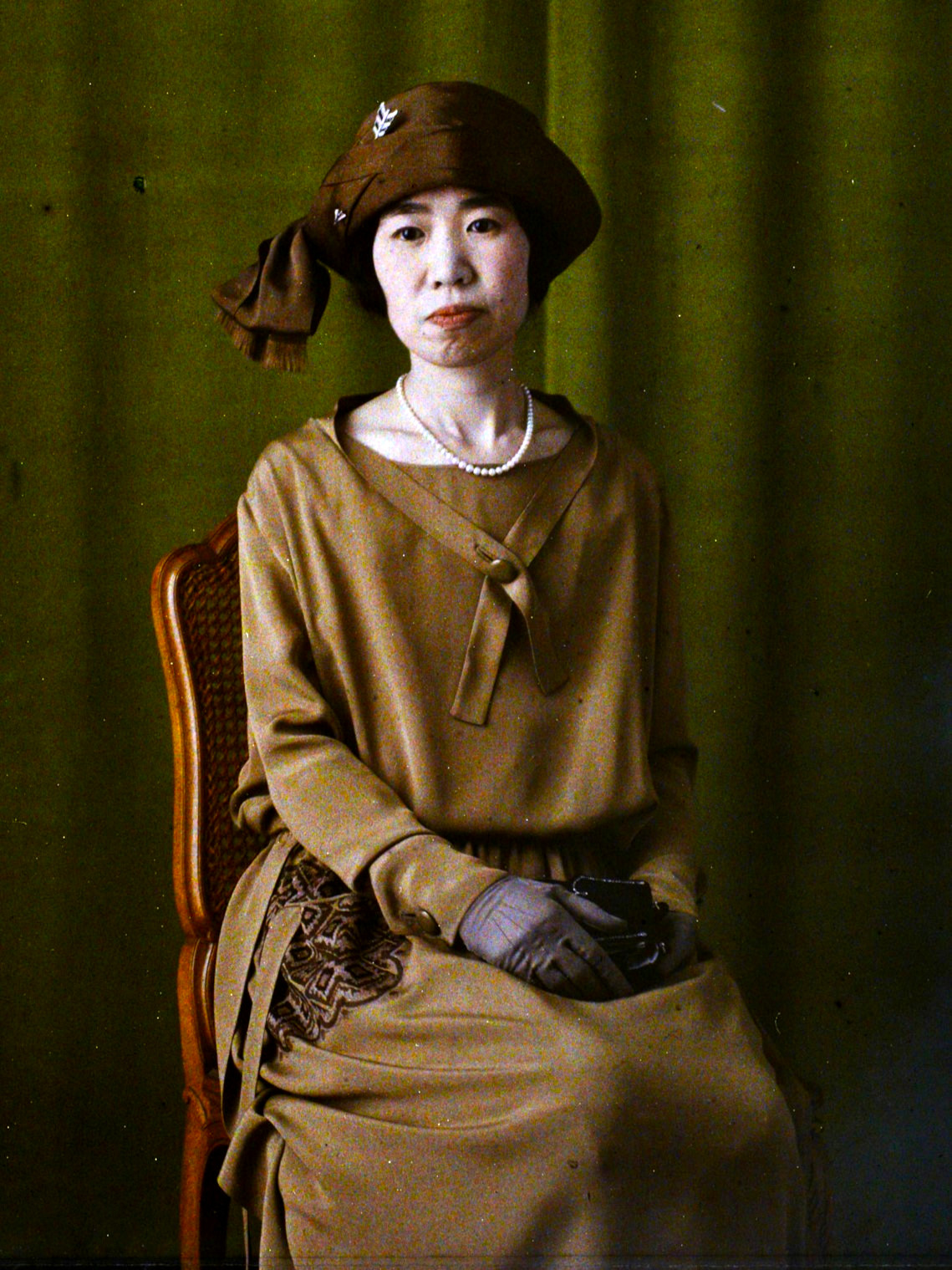
- 1922 Autochrome by Auguste Léon
- Born: Fusako, Princess Kane (周宮房子内親王); 28 January 1890; Tokyo, Japan
- Died: 11 August 1974 (aged 84); Tokyo, Japan
- Spouse: Prince Naruhisa Kitashirakawa (m. 1909; died 1923)
- Children: Prince Nagahisa Kitashirakawa; Mineko Tachibana; Sawako Higashizono; Taeko Tokugawa
- Parents: Emperor Meiji (father); Sono Sachiko (mother)
- Relatives: Imperial House of Japan

Fusako Kitashirakawa (北白川 房子, Kitashirakawa Fusako), born Fusako, Princess Kane (周宮房子内親王, Kane-no-miya Fusako Naishinnō; 28 January 1890 – 11 August 1974), was the eleventh child and seventh daughter of Emperor Meiji of Japan, and the fourth child and third daughter of Sono Sachiko, the Emperor's fifth concubine.

== Biography ==
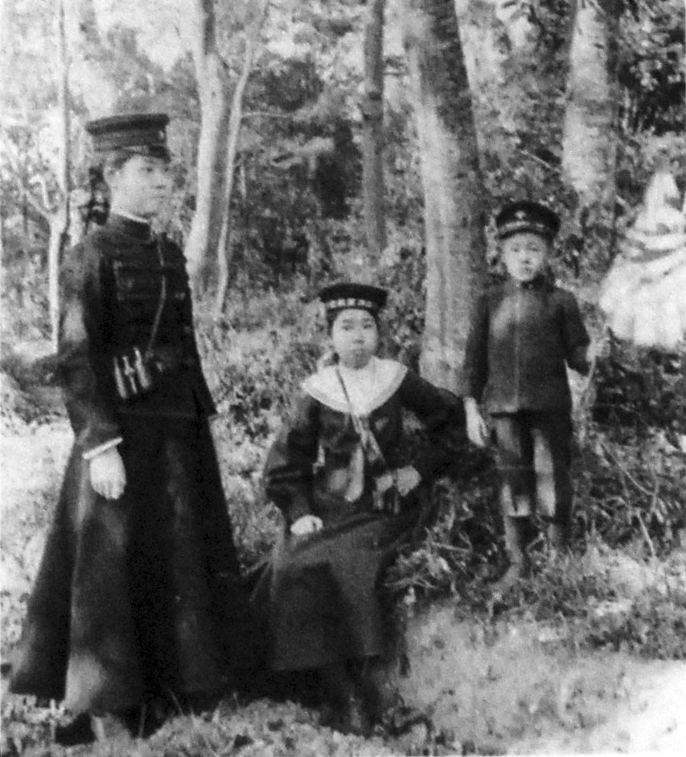
Princess Fusako (left) and Princess Masako (right). Princess Fusako wearing a military uniform for women of the Army.

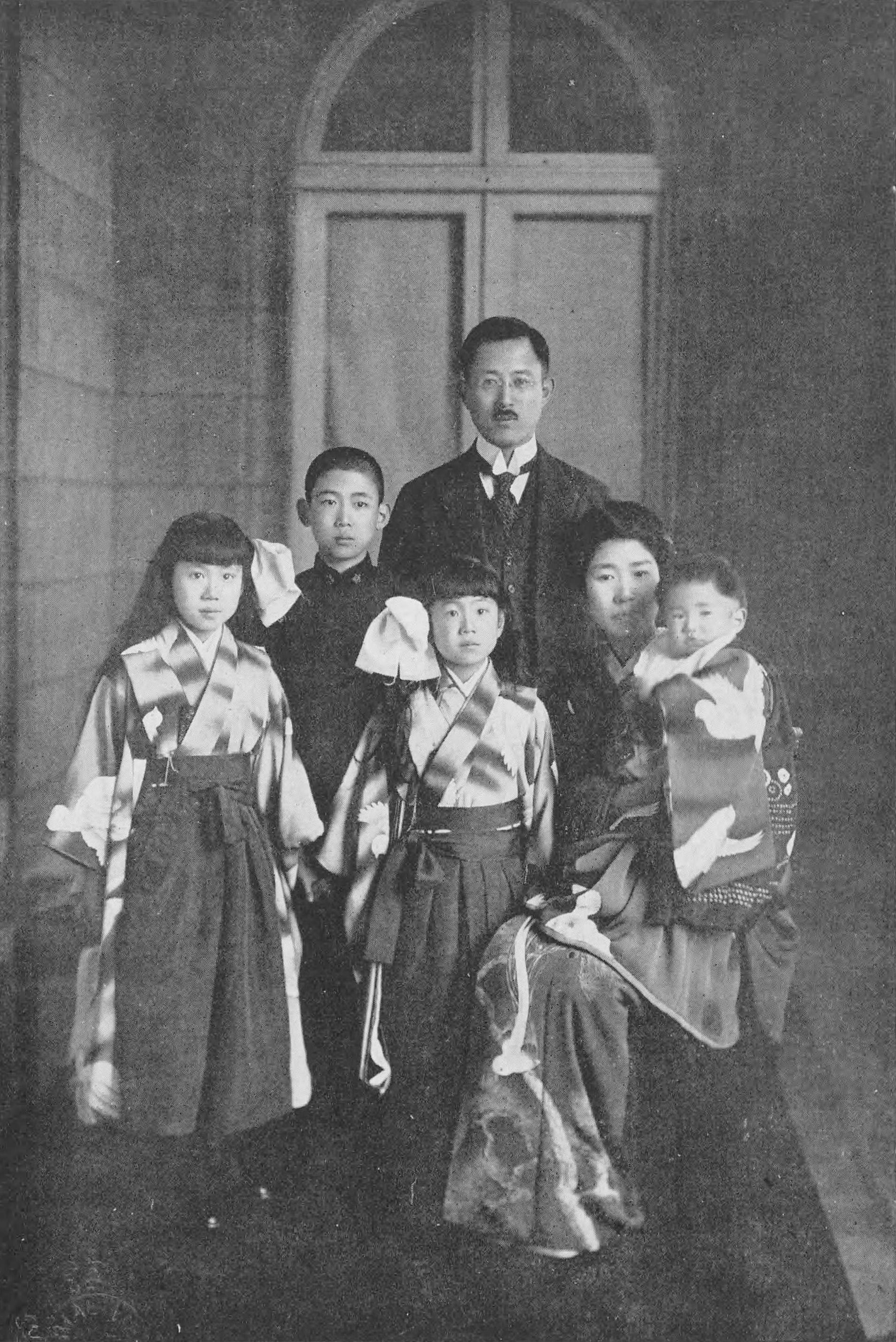
Princess Fusako with her husband and four children in 1921.

Fusako was born in Tokyo, the daughter of Emperor Meiji and Lady Sachiko. Fusako held the childhood appellation "Kane no miya" (Princess Kane).

On 29 April 1909, Princess Kane married Prince Kitashirakawa (1887–1923), the son of Prince Kitashirakawa Yoshihisa and Princess Tomiko. Prince Naruhisa succeeded as head of the house of Kitashirakawa-no-miya after the death of his father in November 1895 during the First Sino-Japanese War. Prince and Princess Kitashirakawa had one son and three daughters:

- Prince Nagahisa Kitashirakawa (北白川宮永久王, Higashikuni Nagahisa Ō; 19 February 1910 – 4 September 1940)
- Princess Mineko Kitashirakawa (美年子女王, Mineko Joō; 6 May 1911 – 10 March 1970); married Viscount Tachibana Tanekatsu
- Princess Sawako Kitashirakawa (佐和子女王, Sawako Joō; 21 October 1913 – 1 July 2001); married Viscount Higashizono Motofumi
- Princess Taeko Kitashirakawa (多惠子女王, Taeko Joō; 15 March 1920 – 5 November 1954); married Tokugawa Yoshihisa, son of Kuniyuki Tokugawa.

In October 1947, the Kitashirakawa and the other branches of the Japanese Imperial Family other than patrilineal descendants of her half-brother, Emperor Taishō were divested of their titles and privileges during the Allied occupation of Japan and became commoners. The former princess served as custodian and chief priestess of the Ise Grand Shrine until her death on 11 August 1974, aged 84.

== Ancestry ==
Ancestors of Fusako Kitashirakawa

16. Emperor Kōkaku (1771–1840)
8. Emperor Ninkō (1800–1846)
17. Lady Kanshuuji Tadako (1780–1843)
4. Emperor Kōmei (1831–1867)
18. Ōgimachi Sanemitsu (1777–1817)
9. Lady Ōgimachi Naoko (1803–1856)
19. Lady Yotsuji Chieko
2. Emperor Meiji (1852–1912)
20. Nakayama Tadayori (1778–1825)
10. Marquess Nakayama Tadayasu (1809–1888)
21. Ōgimachisanjō Tsunako (d. 1858)
5. Lady Nakayama Yoshiko (1836–1907)
22. Matsura Seizan, 9th Lord of Hirado (1760–1841)
11. Matsura Aiko (1818–1906)
23. Mori
1. Fusako, Princess Kane
24. Nakayama Tadaosa (1756–1809)
12. Sono Motoshige (1793–1840)
25. Sanjō Narakimi
6. Count Sono Motosachi (1833–1905)
26. Matsura Seizan, 9th Lord of Hirado (1760–1841)
13. Matsura Kiko
27. Mori
3. Lady Sono Sachiko (1867–1947)
28. Koide Fusatake, 7th Lord of Sonobe (1775–1821)
14. Koide Fusaoki, 8th Lord of Sonobe (1810–1862)
29. Wakebe
7. Koide
30. Matsudaira Yasutō, 8th Lord of Hamada (1779–1841)
15. Matsudaira Minematsu
31. Matsudaira (d. 1805)
