= Carsix =

- Part of Nassandres sur Risle
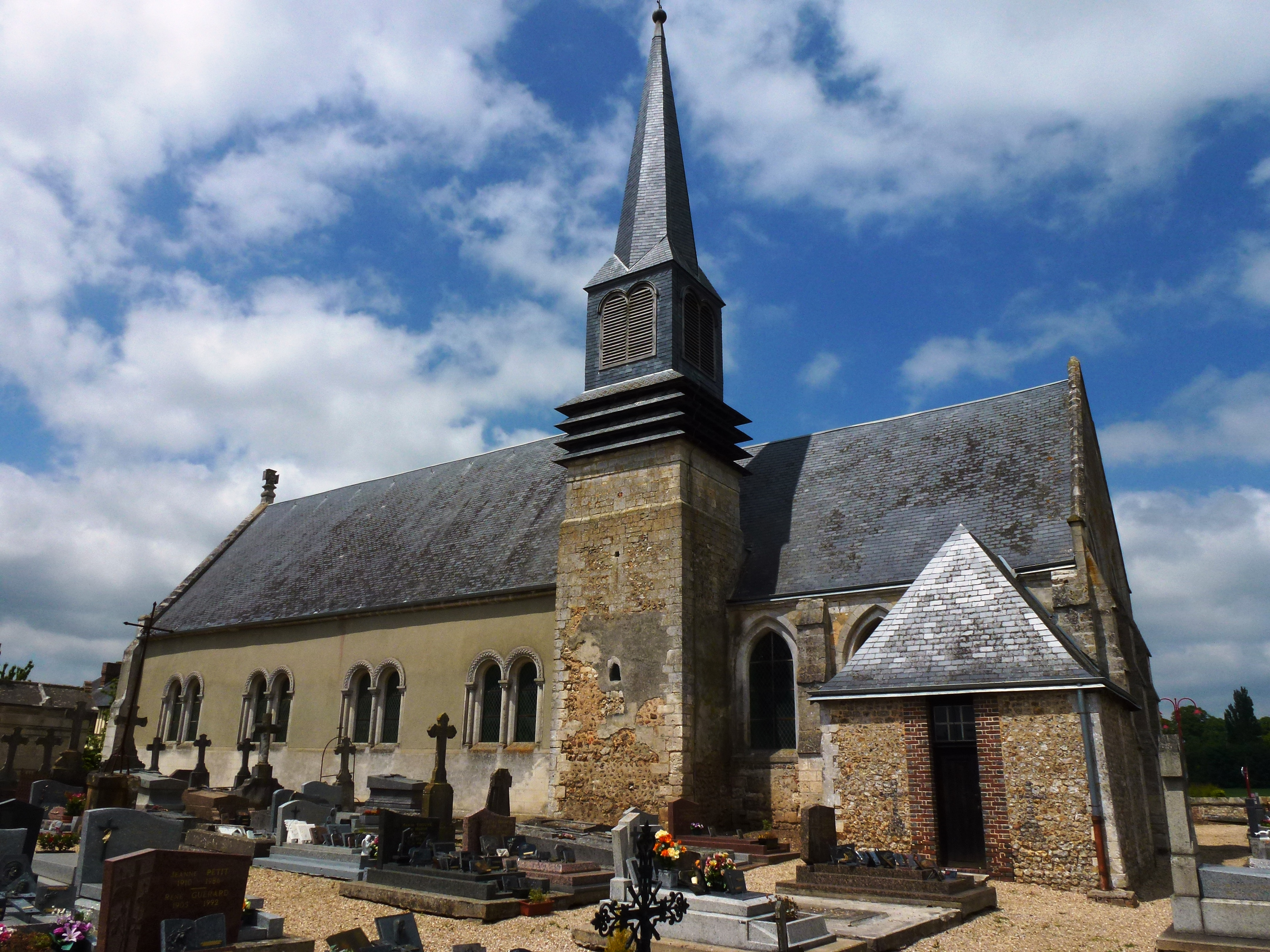
- Location of Carsix
- Location within France Location within Normandy
- Coordinates: 49°08′19″N 0°40′12″E
- Country: France
- Region: Normandy
- Department: Eure
- Arrondissement: Bernay
- Canton: Bernay
- Commune: Nassandres sur Risle
- Area^{1}: 6.57 km^{2} (2.54 sq mi)
- Elevation: 165 m (541 ft)
- Highest elevation: 162 m (531 ft)
- Lowest elevation: 120 m (390 ft)
- Population (2023): 259
  - Density: 39.4/km^{2} (102/sq mi)
- Time zone: UTC+01:00 (CET)
  - Summer (DST): UTC+02:00 (CEST)
- Postal code: 27300
- ^{1} French Land Register data, which excludes lakes, ponds, glaciers > 1 km^{2} (0.386 sq mi or 247 acres) and river estuaries.

Carsix (French pronunciation: [kaʁsi]) is a former commune in the Eure department in northern France. On 1 January 2017, it was merged into the new commune Nassandres sur Risle.

== See also ==
- Communes of the Eure department
