= Prince Tsuneyoshi Takeda =

Japanese politician (1909–1992)

Tsuneyoshi Takeda
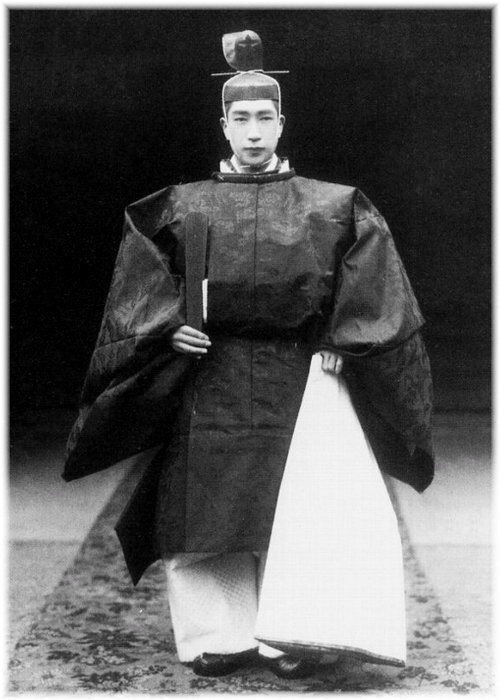

Prince Takeda
- In office 23 April 1919 – 14 October 1947

Head of Takeda-no-miya
- In office 23 April 1919 – 11 May 1992

Personal details
- Born: 4 March 1909 Tokyo, Japan
- Died: 11 May 1992 (aged 83)
- Spouse: Mitsuko Sanjo
- Children: Tsunetada Takeda; Motoko Takeda; Noriko Takeda; Tsuneharu Takeda; Tsunekazu Takeda
- Parents: Tsunehisa, Prince Takeda (father); Masako, Princess Tsune (mother)
- Military career
- Allegiance: Japan
- Branch: Imperial Japanese Army
- Service years: 1930–1945
- Rank: Lieutenant-Colonel
- Units: Unit 731; Southern Expeditionary Army Group; Kwantung Army
- Conflicts: Second Sino-Japanese War; Second World War

Prince Tsuneyoshi Takeda (竹田宮恒徳王, Takeda-no-miya Tsuneyoshi-ō; 4 March 1909 – 11 May 1992) was the second and last heir of the Takeda-no-miya collateral branch of the Japanese Imperial Family.

== Biography ==
=== Early life ===
Prince Takeda Tsuneyoshi was the only son of Prince Takeda Tsunehisa and Masako, Princess Tsune (1888–1940), the sixth daughter of Emperor Meiji. He was, therefore, a first cousin of Emperor Shōwa.

Prince Tsuneyoshi became the second head of the Takeda-no-miya house on 23 April 1919. After being educated at the Gakushūin Peers' School, and serving for a session in the House of Peers, he graduated from the 32nd class of the Imperial Japanese Army Academy in July 1930, and received a commission as a sub-lieutenant in the cavalry.

=== Marriage and family ===
On 12 May 1934, Prince Takeda married Sanjo Mitsuko. She was the youngest daughter of Prince Sanjo Kimiteru, with whom he had five children (3 sons and 2 daughters):

1. Prince Tsunetada Takeda (恒正王), born on 11 October 1940 (age 86)
2. Princess Motoko Takeda (素子女王), (b. 1942)
3. Princess Noriko Takeda (紀子女王), (b. 1943)
4. Prince Tsuneharu Takeda (恒治王) (b. 1944) Japanese ambassador to Bulgaria
5. Tsunekazu Takeda (竹田恒和), (b. 1947)

=== Military career ===
The Prince served a brief tour with a cavalry regiment in Manchuria, and rose to the rank of lieutenant in August 1930 and captain in August 1936. He then graduated from the 50th class of the Army War College in 1938 as the build-up to World War II was beginning. He was promoted to the rank of major in August 1940, and attached to the Imperial Japanese Army General Staff in Tokyo, where he headed the Personnel Department. He became lieutenant colonel in August 1943. Author Sterling Seagrave contends that between 1940 and 1945 Prince Takeda oversaw the looting of gold and other precious items in China, Hong Kong, Vietnam, Laos, Cambodia, Burma, Malaya, Singapore, Sumatra, Java, Borneo and the Philippines. Seagrave says that most of this loot was stored in 175 vaults located in the Philippines, and that considerable amounts have since been recovered by former Philippine President Ferdinand Marcos and others.

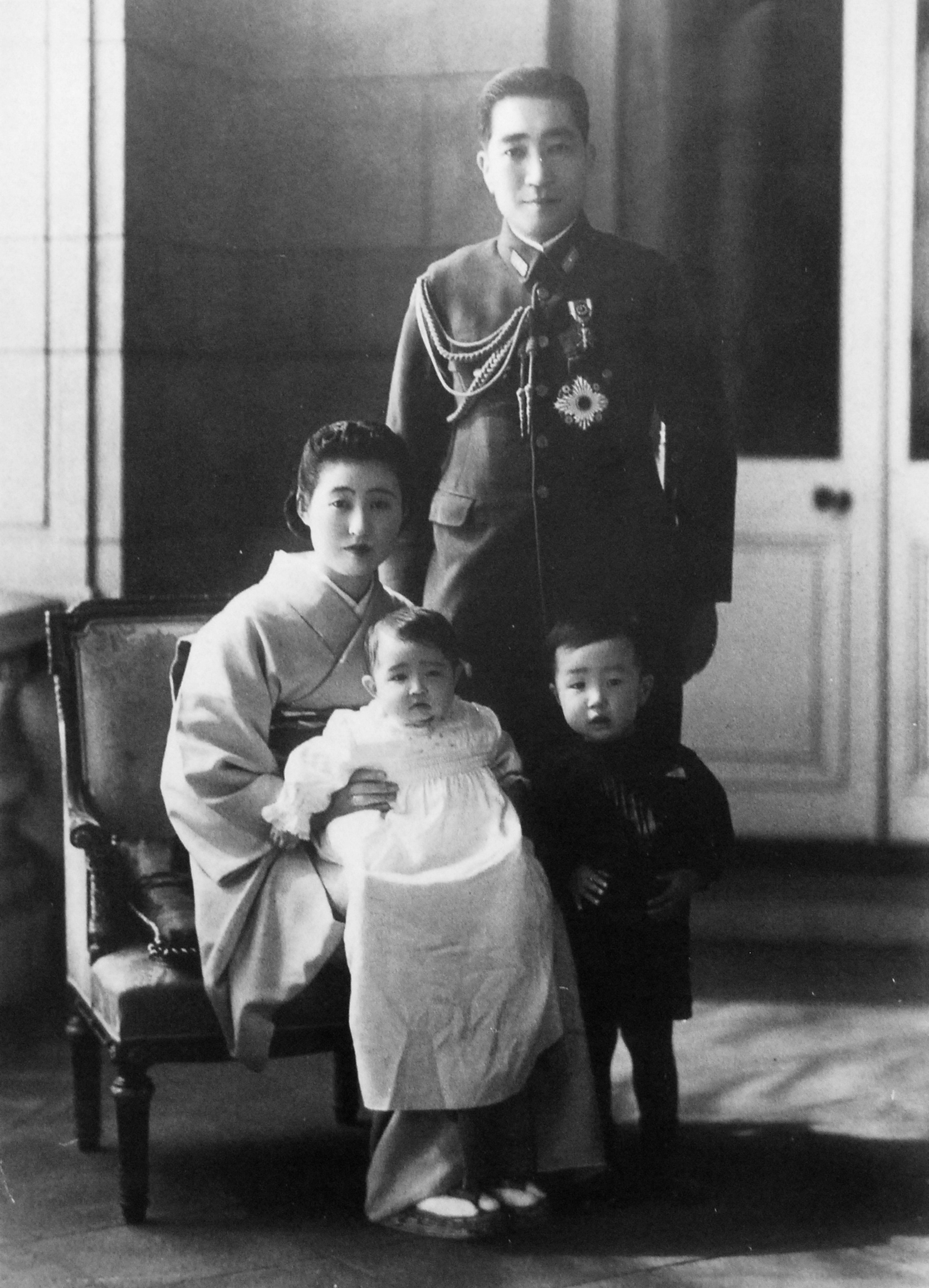
Takeda with his wife, Princess Mitsuko, and their two eldest children in 1942

Prince Takeda held executive responsibilities over Unit 731 in his role as chief financial officer of the Kwantung Army. Unit 731 conducted biological weapons research on human subjects with a variety of bacterial cultures and viruses during World War II. According to Daniel Barenblatt, Takeda received, with Prince Mikasa, a special screening by Shirō Ishii of a film showing imperial planes loading germ bombs for bubonic plague dissemination over the Chinese city of Ningbo in 1940.

Moreover, historian Hal Gold has alleged in his work "Unit 731 Testimony" that Prince Takeda had a more active role as "Lieutenant Colonel Miyata" – an officer in the Strategic Section of the Operations Division. Gold reports the testimony of a veteran of the Youth Corps of this unit, who testified in July 1994 in Morioka during a traveling exhibition on Shirō Ishii's experiments, that Takeda watched while outside poison gas tests were made on thirty prisoners near Anda. After the war, a staff photographer also recalled the day the Prince visited Unit 731's facility at Pingfang, Manchukuo and had his picture taken at the gates.

Prince Takeda briefly served as the emperor's personal liaison to the Saigon headquarters of Field Marshal Terauchi Hisaichi, commander of the Southern Expeditionary Army Group. During that assignment, he observed first-hand the desperate conditions of the Japanese forces at Rabaul, Guadalcanal, and in Luzon. After his return, he was then assigned to the Kwantung Army headquarters. After Emperor Shōwa's radio address announcing the surrender of Japan on 15 August 1945, he went to Shinkyo in Manchukuo to ensure the Kwantung Army's compliance with the surrender orders.

=== Post-war ===
With the abolition of the collateral branches of the imperial family by American occupation authorities on 14 October 1947, Prince Tsuneyoshi and his family became commoners. Initially, he retired to his estate in Chiba Prefecture to raise racehorses, thus escaping the financial hardship many of his cousins experienced during the American occupation of Japan.

Takeda turned his attention to promoting and developing amateur and professional sports. As a participant in equestrian events as part of Japan's delegation to the 1936 Summer Olympics in Berlin, he already had a reputation as the "sports prince". He became president of the Japan Skating Federation in 1948 and a member of the north Tokyo Rotary Club. He became president of the Japanese Olympic Committee in 1962 and was an important figure at the Organizing Committees of the 1964 Summer Olympics in Tokyo and the 1972 Winter Olympics in Sapporo. He was also a member of the International Olympic Committee from 1967 to 1981, during which he was director of its executive board for five years.

In 1987, the former Prince published a volume of autobiographical essays entitled "Kumo no ue shita: Omoide-banashi" (Above and Below the Clouds: Remembrances).

The former Prince died of heart failure on 12 May 1992.

The former Takeda palace and a portion of its gardens in Tokyo survives as a part of the Grand Prince Hotel Takanawa, and is open to the public.

== Ancestry ==
Ancestors of Prince Tsuneyoshi Takeda

16. Prince Fushimi Sadayuki (1776-1841)
8. Prince Fushimi Kuniie (1802-1872)
4. Prince Kitashirakawa Yoshihisa (1847-1895)
18. Horiuchi Mamoru
9. Horiuchi Nobuko
2. Prince Takeda Tsunehisa (1882-1919)
5. Saruhashi Sachiko
1. Prince Takeda Tsuneyoshi
24. Emperor Ninkō (1800-1846)
12. Emperor Kōmei (1831-1867)
25. Lady Ōgimachi Naoko (1803-1856)
6. Emperor Meiji (1852-1912)
26. Marquess Nakayama Tadayasu (1809-1888)
13. Lady Nakayama Yoshiko (1836-1907)
27. Matsura Aiko (1818-1906)
3. Princess Masako Takeda (1888-1940)
28. Sono Motoshige (1793-1840)
14. Count Sono Motosachi (1833-1905)
29. Matsura Kiko
7. Lady Sono Sachiko (1867-1947)
30. Koide Fusaoki, 8th Lord of Sonobe (1810-1862)
15. Koide
31. Matsudaira Minematsu

== Notes ==
Sporting positions
Preceded by Juichi Tsushima	President of the Japanese Olympic Committee; 1962–1969	Succeeded by Hanji Aoki
