= Princess Masako Takeda =

Japanese princess

Masako
- Princess Takeda
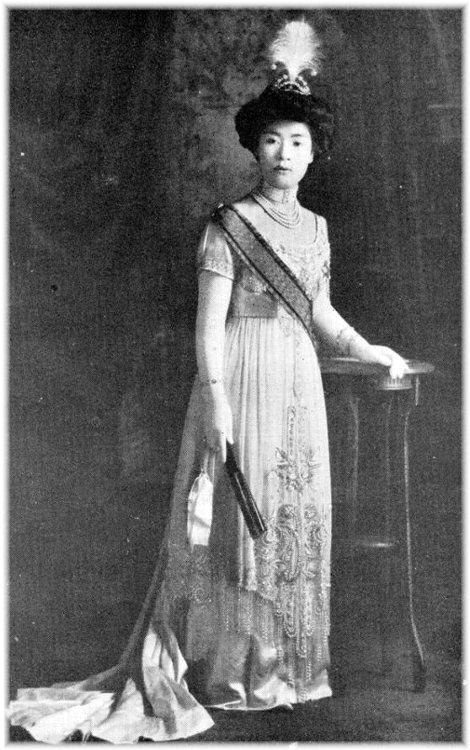
- Born: Masako, Princess Tsune (常宮昌子内親王); 30 September 1888; Tokyo Prefecture, Japan
- Died: 8 March 1940 (aged 51); Tokyo Prefecture, Japan
- Spouse: Prince Tsunehisa Takeda (m. 1908; died 1919)
- Issue: Prince Tsuneyoshi of Takeda; Princess Ayako of Takeda
- House: Imperial House of Japan
- Father: Emperor Meiji
- Mother: Sono Sachiko

Masako, Princess Takeda (恒久王妃昌子内親王, Tsunehisa Ōhi Masako naishinnō), born Masako, Princess Tsune (常宮昌子内親王, Tsune-no-miya Masako Naishinnō; 30 September 1888 – 8 March 1940), was the tenth child and sixth daughter of Emperor Meiji of Japan, and the third child and second daughter of Sono Sachiko, the Emperor's fifth concubine.

== Biography ==
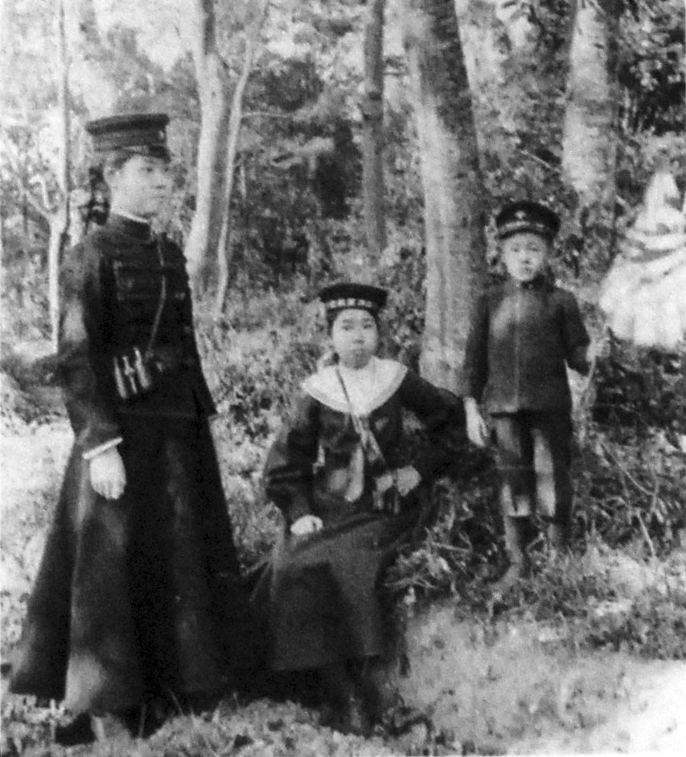
Princess Masako (right) and Princess Fusako (left). Princess Masako is wearing the uniform for women of the Navy.

Masako was born in Tokyo Prefecture, the daughter of Emperor Meiji and Lady Sachiko. She held the childhood appellation "Tsune no miya" (Princess Tsune).

Her future husband, Prince Tsunehisa Takeda, was the eldest son of Prince Kitashirakawa Yoshihisa and thus the brother of Prince Kitashirakawa Naruhisa. Emperor Meiji authorized Prince Tsunehisa to start a new princely house in March 1906, largely to provide a household with suitable status for his sixth daughter Princess Tsune. Prince Takeda married Princess Masako on 30 April 1908, by whom he had a son and a daughter:

1. Prince Tsuneyoshi Takeda (竹田宮恒徳王, Takeda-no-miya Tsuneyoshi Ō; 4 March 1909 – 11 May 1992)
2. Princess Ayako Takeda (禮子女王, Ayako Joō; 4 July 1913 – 3 September 2003), married Count Sano Tsunemitsu.

She died on 8 March 1940, aged 51.

== Honours ==
- Grand Cordon of the Order of the Precious Crown

== Ancestry ==
Ancestors of Princess Masako Takeda

16. Emperor Kōkaku (1771–1840)
8. Emperor Ninkō (1800–1846)
17. Lady Kanshuuji Tadako (1780–1843)
4. Emperor Kōmei (1831–1867)
18. Ōgimachi Sanemitsu (1777–1817)
9. Lady Ōgimachi Naoko (1803–1856)
19. Lady Yotsuji Chieko
2. Emperor Meiji (1852–1912)
20. Nakayama Tadayori (1778–1825)
10. Marquess Nakayama Tadayasu (1809–1888)
21. Ōgimachisanjō Tsunako (d. 1858)
5. Lady Nakayama Yoshiko (1836–1907)
22. Matsura Seizan, 9th Lord of Hirado (1760–1841)
11. Matsura Aiko (1818–1906)
23. Mori
1. Masako, Princess Takeda
24. Nakayama Tadaosa (1756–1809)
12. Sono Motoshige (1793–1840)
25. Sanjō Narakimi
6. Count Sono Motosachi (1833–1905)
26. Matsura Seizan, 9th Lord of Hirado (1760–1841)
13. Matsura Kiko
27. Mori
3. Lady Sono Sachiko (1867–1947)
28. Koide Fusatake, 7th Lord of Sonobe (1775–1821)
14. Koide Fusaoki, 8th Lord of Sonobe (1810–1862)
29. Wakebe
7. Koide
30. Matsudaira Yasutō, 8th Lord of Hamada (1779–1841)
15. Matsudaira Minematsu
31. Matsudaira (d. 1805)
