= Nassandres sur Risle =

- Commune
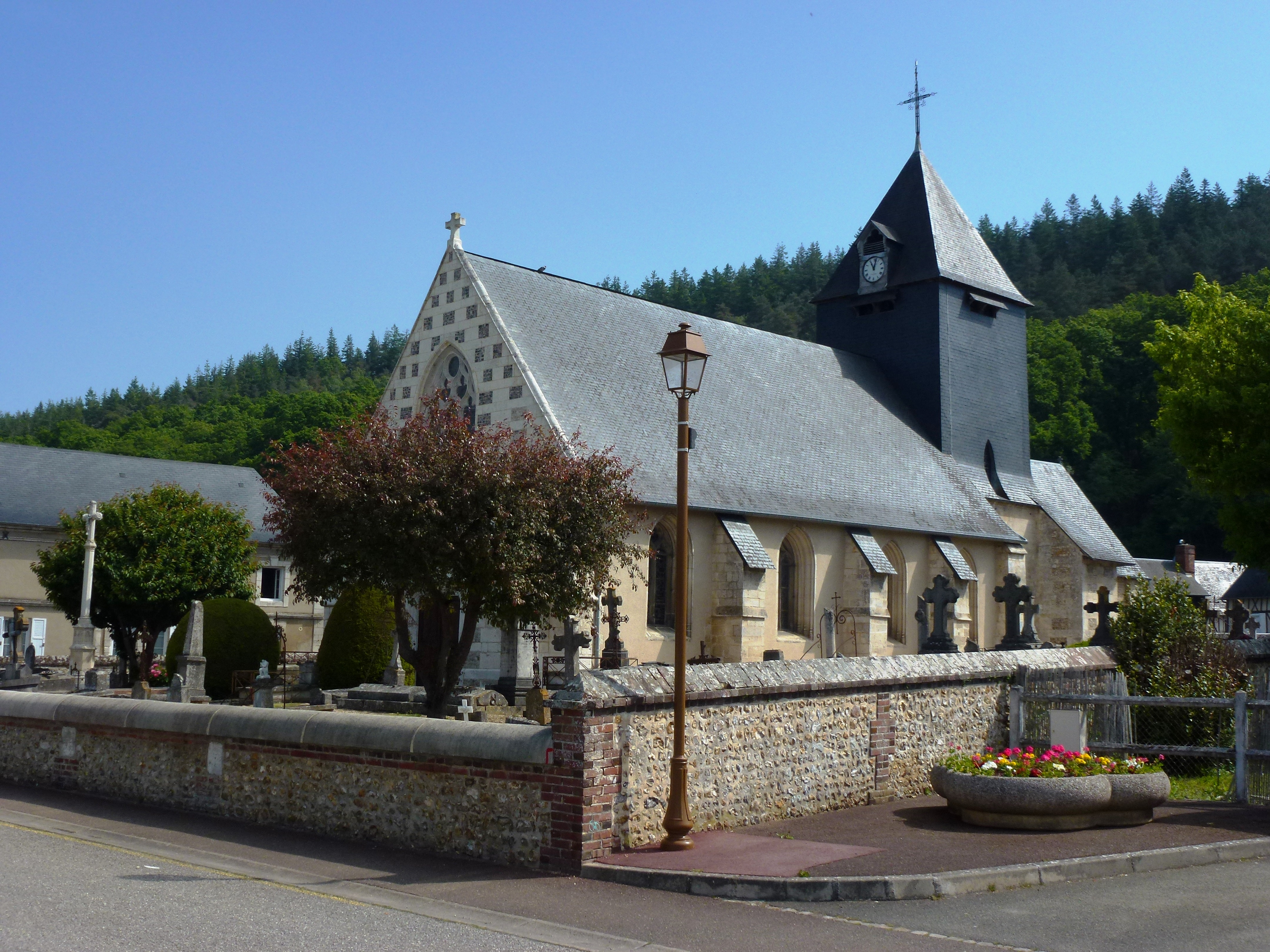
- The church in Nassandres
- Location of Nassandres sur Risle
- Location within France Location within Normandy
- Coordinates: 49°07′41″N 0°44′10″E
- Country: France
- Region: Normandy
- Department: Eure
- Arrondissement: Bernay
- Canton: Brionne
- Intercommunality: Bernay Terres de Normandie

Government
  - Mayor (2020–2026): André Anthierens
- Area^{1}: 25.58 km^{2} (9.88 sq mi)
- Population (2023): 2,276
  - Density: 88.98/km^{2} (230.4/sq mi)
- Time zone: UTC+01:00 (CET)
  - Summer (DST): UTC+02:00 (CEST)
- INSEE/Postal code: 27425 /27550
- ^{1} French Land Register data, which excludes lakes, ponds, glaciers > 1 km^{2} (0.386 sq mi or 247 acres) and river estuaries.

Nassandres sur Risle (French pronunciation: [nasɑ̃dʁ syʁ ʁil], literally Nassandres on Risle) is a commune in the department of Eure, northern France. The municipality was established on 1 January 2017 by merger of the former communes of Nassandres (the seat), Carsix, Fontaine-la-Soret and Perriers-la-Campagne.

== Geography ==
The commune along with another 69 communes shares part of a 4,747 hectare, Natura 2000 conservation area, called Risle, Guiel, Charentonne.

== Population ==
Population data refer to the commune in its geography as of January 2025.

Historical population
Year	Pop.	±% p.a.
1968	2,244	—
1975	2,270	+0.16%
1982	2,340	+0.43%
1990	2,258	−0.44%
1999	2,332	+0.36%
2007	2,394	+0.33%
2012	2,392	−0.02%
2017	2,394	+0.02%
2023	2,276	−0.84%
Source: INSEE

== See also ==
- Communes of the Eure department
