= Perriers-la-Campagne =

- Part of Nassandres sur Risle
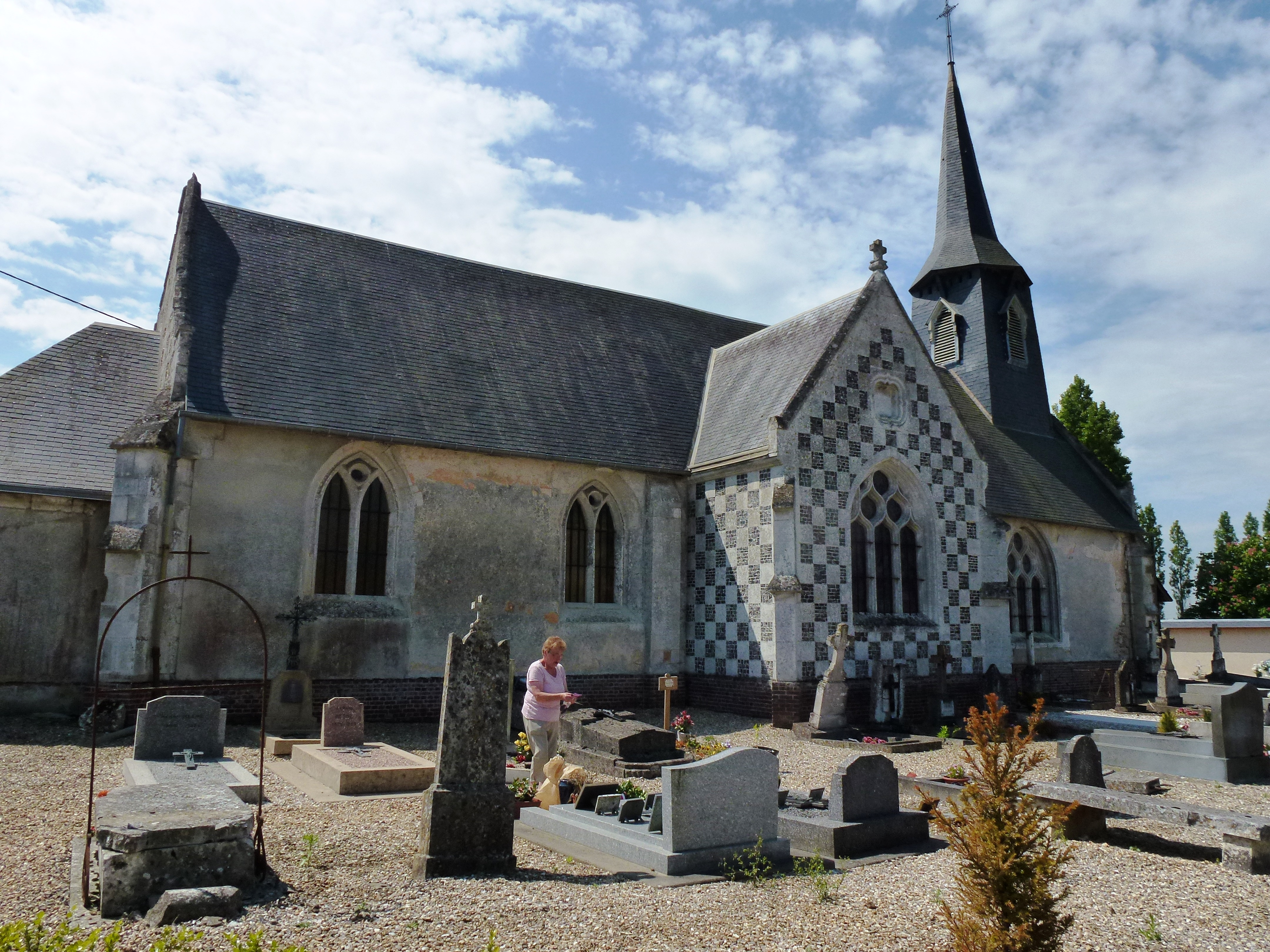

- Coat of arms
- Location of Perriers-la-Campagne
- Location within France Location within Normandy
- Coordinates: 49°09′08″N 0°44′45″E
- Country: France
- Region: Normandy
- Department: Eure
- Arrondissement: Bernay
- Canton: Brionne
- Commune: Nassandres sur Risle
- Area^{1}: 4.47 km^{2} (1.73 sq mi)
- Elevation: 152 m (499 ft)
- Highest elevation: 147 m (482 ft)
- Lowest elevation: 130 m (430 ft)
- Population (2023): 397
  - Density: 88.8/km^{2} (230/sq mi)
- Time zone: UTC+01:00 (CET)
  - Summer (DST): UTC+02:00 (CEST)
- Postal code: 27170
- ^{1} French Land Register data, which excludes lakes, ponds, glaciers > 1 km^{2} (0.386 sq mi or 247 acres) and river estuaries.

Perriers-la-Campagne (French pronunciation: [pɛʁje la kɑ̃paɲ]) is a former commune in the Eure department in Normandy in northern France. On 1 January 2017, it was merged into the new commune Nassandres sur Risle.

== History ==
The Japanese prince Prince Naruhisa Kitashirakawa died there in a car accident in 1923.

== See also ==
- Communes of the Eure department
