= Ayako Sano =

Japanese princess

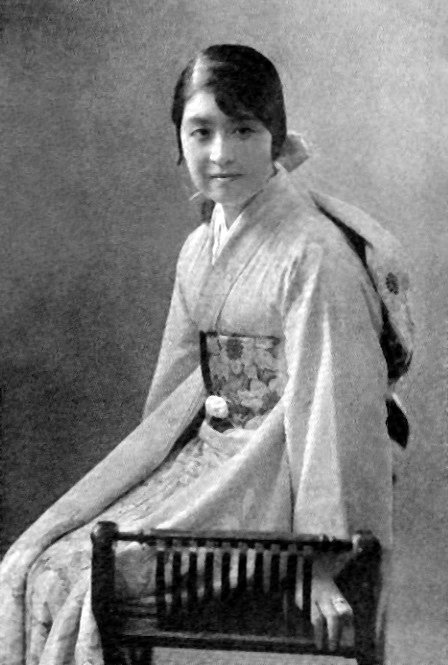
- Ayako in 1930
- Born: Princess Ayako Takeda (禮子女王); July 4, 1913; Tokyo, Japan
- Died: September 3, 2003 (aged 90); Tokyo, Japan
- Resting place: Aoyama Cemetery, Tokyo
- Spouse: Tsunemitsu Sano (m. 1934)
- Children: 4
- Parents: Tsunehisa, Prince Takeda (father); Masako, Princess Tsune (mother)

Ayako Sano (佐野禮子, Sano Ayako; July 4, 1913 – September 3, 2003), formerly Princess Ayako Takeda (禮子女王, Ayako Joō), was the daughter of Prince Tsunehisa Takeda and Princess Masako Takeda, and was thus the granddaughter of Emperor Meiji through her mother's side. She married Tsunemitsu Sano in March 1934, and had four children. She lost her status as a member of the Imperial Family in October 1947 with the abolition of collateral imperial houses by the American Occupation Authorities. She died on September 3, 2003.
