= Nassandres =

Commune in Eure, France

- Part of Nassandres sur Risle
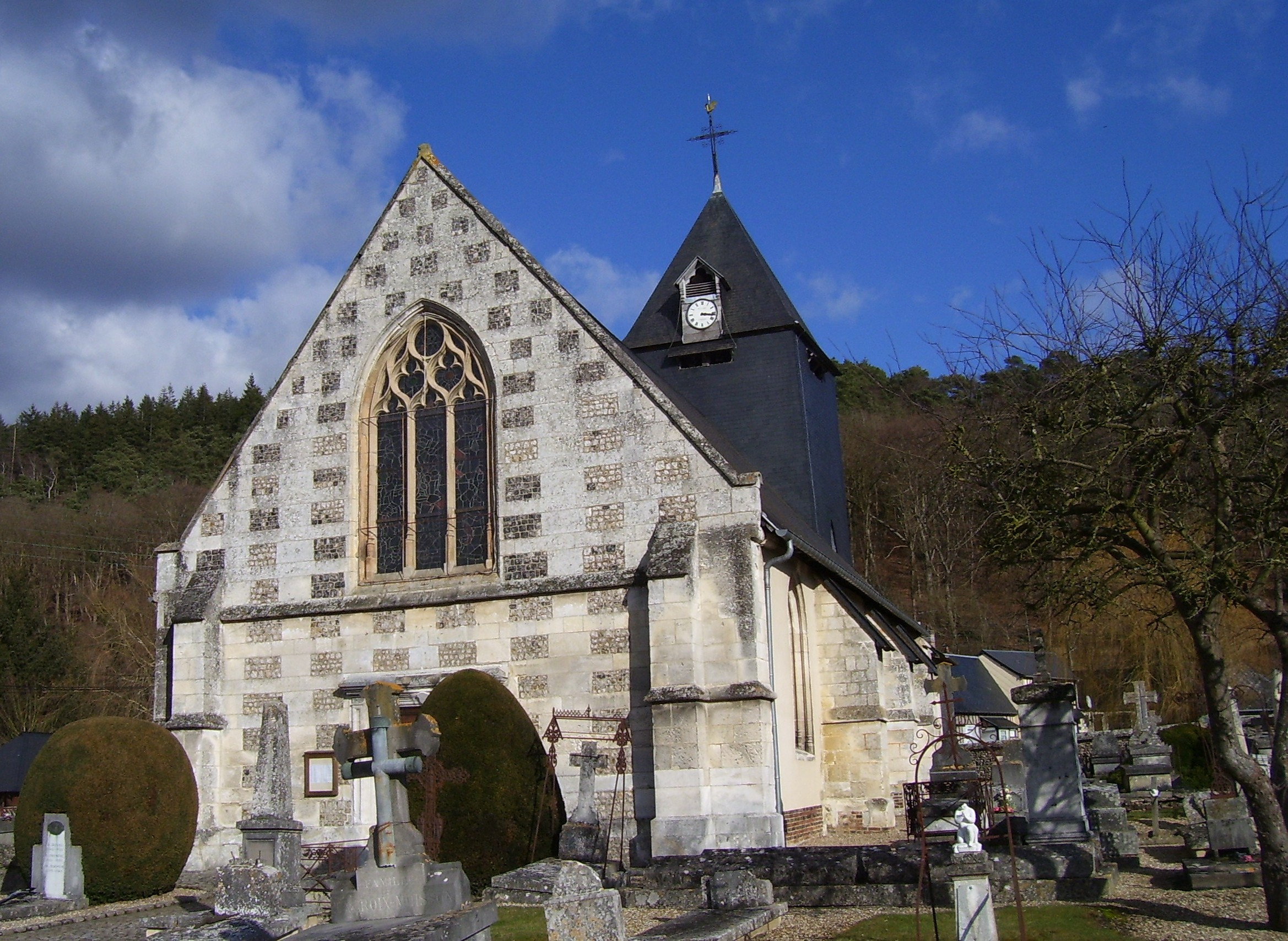

- Coat of arms
- Location of Nassandres
- Location within France Location within Normandy
- Coordinates: 49°07′39″N 0°44′08″E
- Country: France
- Region: Normandy
- Department: Eure
- Arrondissement: Bernay
- Canton: Brionne
- Commune: Nassandres sur Risle
- Area^{1}: 4.92 km^{2} (1.90 sq mi)
- Elevation: 80 m (260 ft)
- Highest elevation: 149 m (489 ft)
- Lowest elevation: 63 m (207 ft)
- Population (2022): 1,260
  - Density: 256/km^{2} (663/sq mi)
- Time zone: UTC+01:00 (CET)
  - Summer (DST): UTC+02:00 (CEST)
- Postal code: 27550
- ^{1} French Land Register data, which excludes lakes, ponds, glaciers > 1 km^{2} (0.386 sq mi or 247 acres) and river estuaries.

Nassandres (French pronunciation: [nasɑ̃dʁ]) is a former commune in the Eure department in Normandy in northern France. On 1 January 2017, it was merged into the new commune Nassandres sur Risle.

== Population ==
Historical population
| Year | Pop. | ±% p.a. |
|---|---|---|
| 1962 | 1,233 | — |
| 1968 | 1,307 | +0.98% |
| 1975 | 1,331 | +0.26% |
| 1982 | 1,417 | +0.90% |
| 1990 | 1,350 | −0.60% |
| 1999 | 1,381 | +0.25% |
| 2006 | 1,387 | +0.06% |
| 2022 | 1,260 | −0.60% |
Source: EHESS and INSEE

== Sights ==
The church of Saint-André was built in the 12th century and enlarged in the 16th century. The sacristy was built in the 17th century.

== See also ==
- Communes of the Eure department
