= Fontaine-la-Soret =

- Part of Nassandres sur Risle
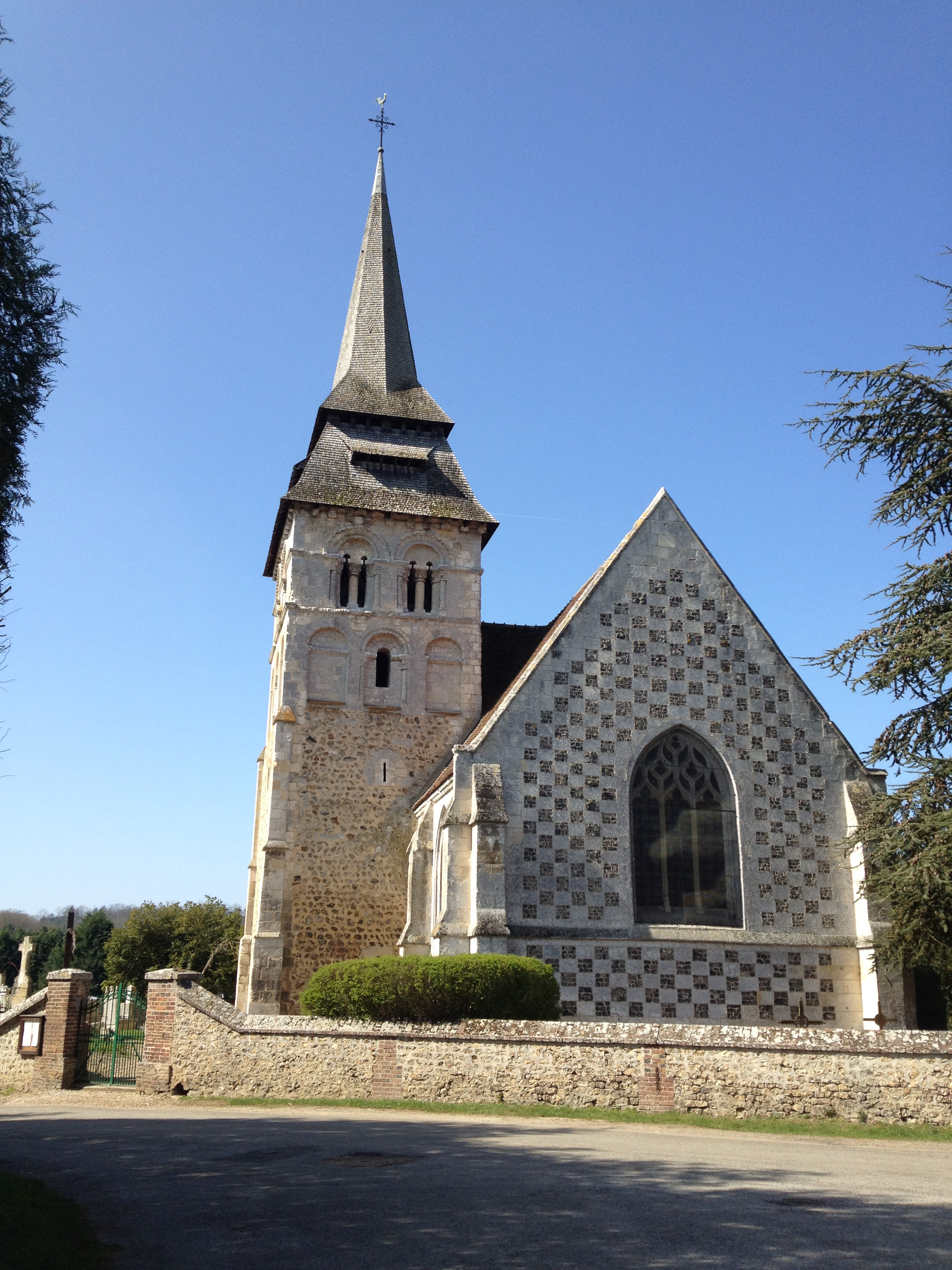
- Location of Fontaine-la-Soret
- Location within France Location within Normandy
- Coordinates: 49°09′N 0°43′E
- Country: France
- Region: Normandy
- Department: Eure
- Arrondissement: Bernay
- Canton: Brionne
- Commune: Nassandres sur Risle
- Area^{1}: 9.62 km^{2} (3.71 sq mi)
- Elevation: 146 m (479 ft)
- Highest elevation: 154 m (505 ft)
- Lowest elevation: 57 m (187 ft)
- Population (2023): 368
  - Density: 38.3/km^{2} (99.1/sq mi)
- Time zone: UTC+01:00 (CET)
  - Summer (DST): UTC+02:00 (CEST)
- Postal code: 27550
- ^{1} French Land Register data, which excludes lakes, ponds, glaciers > 1 km^{2} (0.386 sq mi or 247 acres) and river estuaries.

Fontaine-la-Soret (French pronunciation: [fɔ̃tɛn la sɔʁɛ]) is a former commune in the Eure department in the Normandy region in northern France. On 1 January 2017, it was merged into the new commune Nassandres sur Risle.

== See also ==
- Communes of the Eure department
