= Prince Nagahisa Kitashirakawa =

Japanese royal (1910–1940)

Nagahisa Kitashirakawa
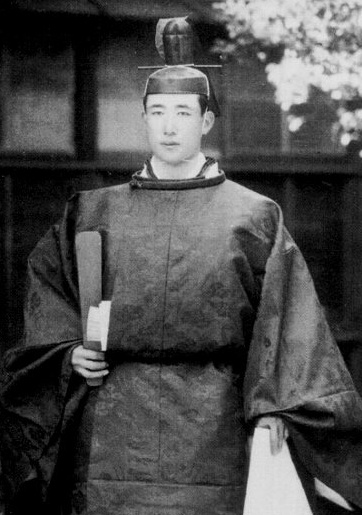
- Japanese Imperial Army Captain Prince Kitashirakawa Nagahisa

Prince Kitashirakawa
- In office 1 April 1923 – 4 September 1940
- Preceded by: Naruhisa Kitashirakawa
- Succeeded by: Michihisa Kitashirakawa

Personal details
- Born: 19 February 1910 Takanawa, Tokyo, Japan
- Died: 4 September 1940 (aged 30) Zhangjiakou, Mengukuo
- Spouse: Sachiko Tokugawa (德川祥子)
- Children: Michihisa Kitashirakawa (北白川道久); Hatsuko Shimazu (島津肇子)
- Parents: Prince Kitashirakawa Naruhisa (北白川宮成久王) (father); Fusako, Princess Kane (周宮房子内親王) (mother)
- Military career
- Allegiance: Japan
- Branch: Imperial Japanese Army
- Service years: 1931–1940
- Rank: Major
- Unit: North China Area Army
- Conflicts: Second Sino-Japanese War; Second World War
- Awards: Order of the Golden Kite (4th class); Grand Cordon of the Order of the Chrysanthemum

Prince Nagahisa Kitashirakawa (北白川宮永久王, Kitashirakawa-no-miya Nagahisa-ō; 19 February 1910 – 4 September 1940) of Japan, was the 4th head of the Kitashirakawa-no-miya collateral branch of the Japanese imperial family and a career officer in the Imperial Japanese Army.

== Early years ==
Prince Kitashirakawa Nagahisa was the only son of Prince Naruhisa Kitashirakawa and Fusako, Princess Kane. He succeeded as the head of the Kitashirakawa-no-miya house upon his father's unexpected death in an automobile accident in France in 1923.

== Marriage and family ==
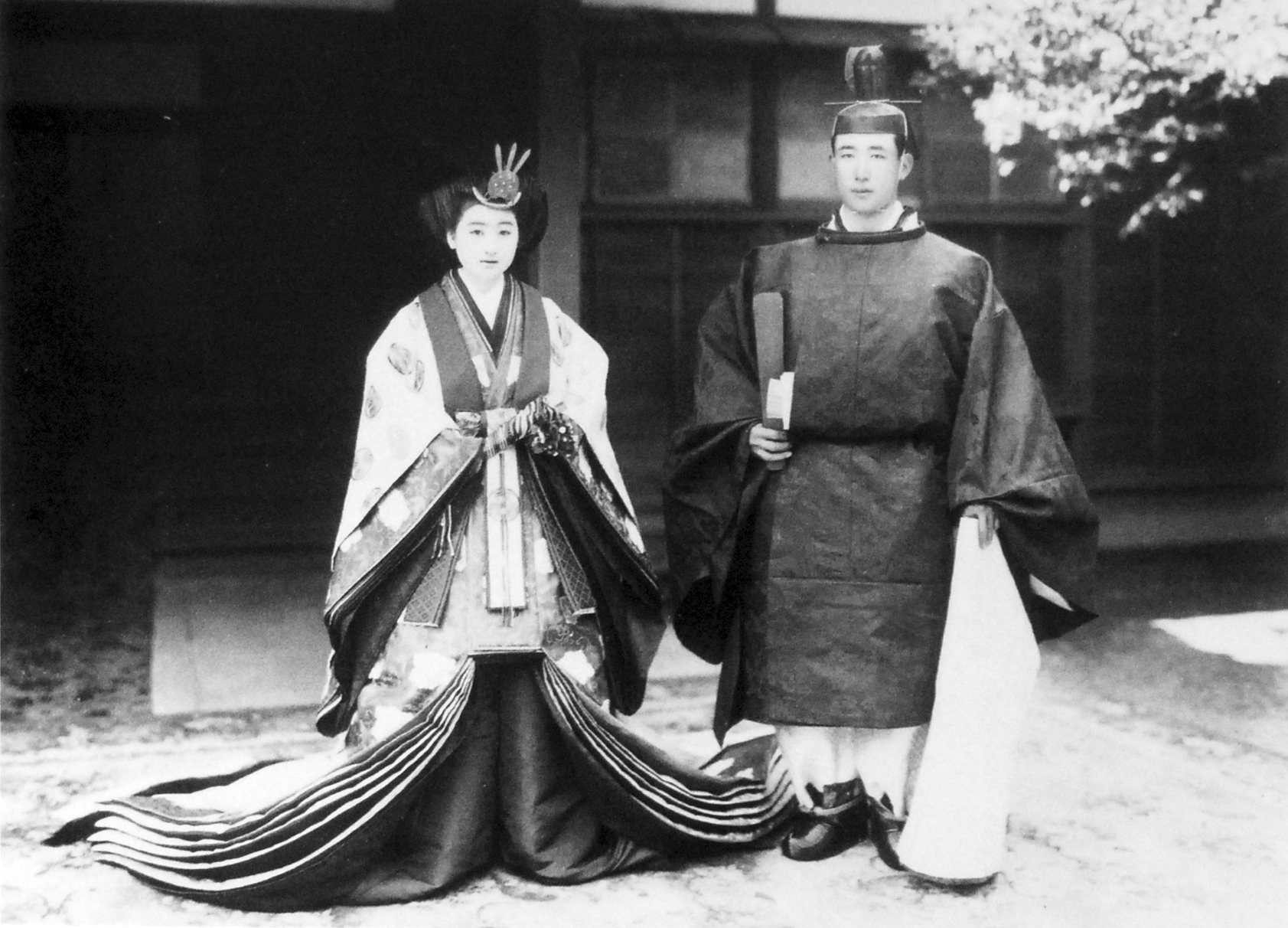
Wedding Photo, 1935

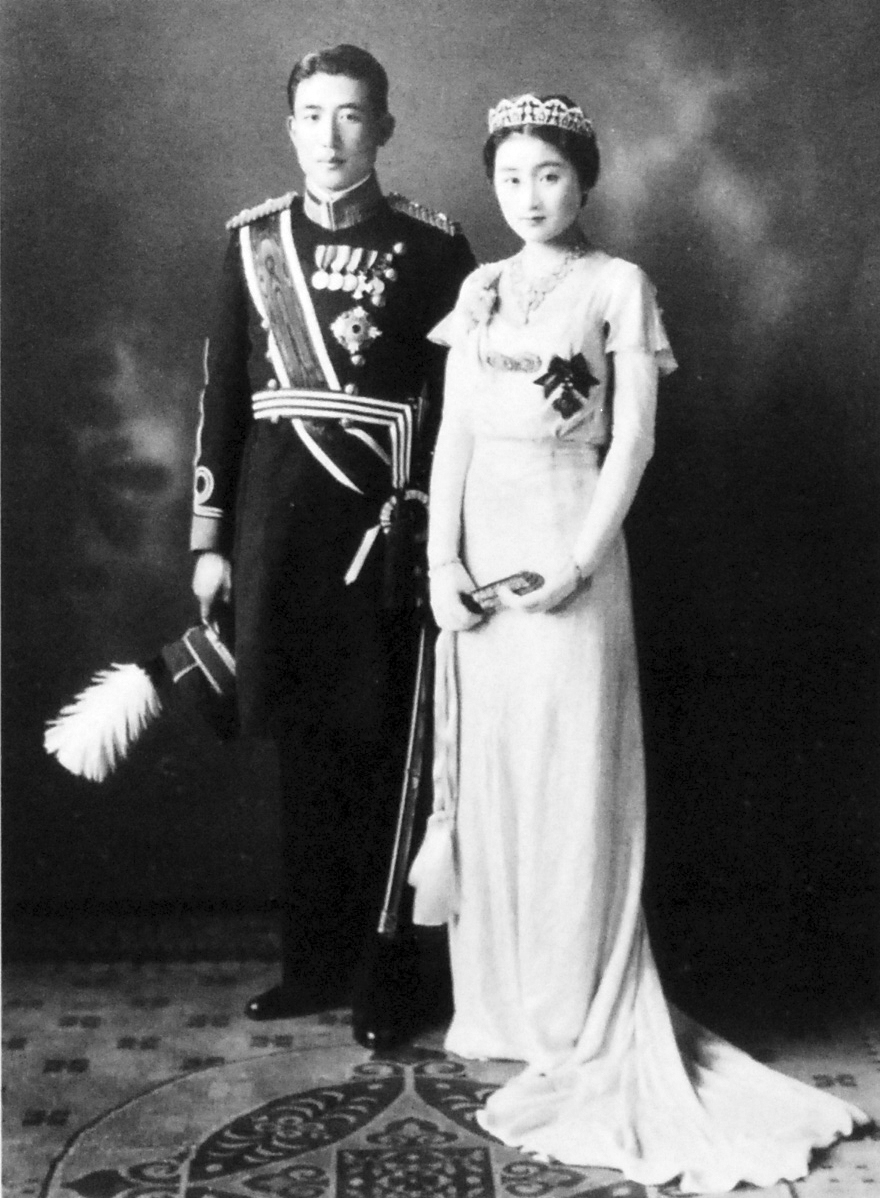
Wedding Photo, 1935

On 25 April 1935, Prince Nagahisa married Sachiko Tokugawa, born 26 August 1916, died 21 January 2015 (aged 98), the daughter of Baron Yoshikuni Tokugawa. Prince and Princess Kitashirakawa Nagahisa had one son and one daughter:

1. Prince Michihisa Kitashirakawa (北白川道久, Kitashirakawa Michihisa-ō; 2 May 1937 - 20 October 2018)
2. Princess Hatsuko Kitashirakawa (肇子女王, Hatsuko Joō; b. 13 November 1939 (age 87)), married Duke Shimazu

== Military career ==
Prince Nagahisa graduated from the 43rd class of the Imperial Japanese Army Academy in 1931, and was commissioned a sub-lieutenant in field artillery. He was promoted to lieutenant in 1936 and captain in 1939 after his graduation from the 52nd class of the Army Staff College. After the start of the Second Sino-Japanese War, the Prince was assigned to the North China Area Army. However, on 14 September 1940, Captain Prince Kitashirakawa died in an airplane crash while on duty in Mengjiang, thus becoming the first member of the Imperial Family killed in World War II .

The Prince received a posthumous promotion to major and the Grand Cordon of the Order of the Chrysanthemum.

== Subsequent history ==
Prince Nagahisa's widow, Princess Sachiko became a commoner in 1947 with the abolition of the collateral branches of the Japanese imperial family during the American occupation of Japan. She became a professor at Ochanomizu University, and in 1969 entered the service of the Imperial Household Agency. She served for many years as the chief of the ladies-in-waiting to Empress Kōjun.

The site of the Kitashirakawa palace in Tokyo is now the Shin-Takanawa Prince Hotel.
