= Tsuneharu Takeda =

Japanese diplomat

Tsuneharu Takeda (竹田 恒治, Takeda Tsuneharu; born August 3, 1944) is a Japanese diplomat, and former imperial prince. He was born in Shinkyo, then the capital of Manchukuo.

== Biography ==
Takeda is the second son of former Prince Takeda Tsuneyoshi (1909–1992), the second head of the Takeda-no-miya collateral branch of the Imperial Family of Japan. His mother is former Princess Sanjō Mitsuko. At the time of his birth, he was styled as a prince, but at the age of three in 1947, when all collateral branches of the imperial family were abolished by the American occupation authorities, he became a commoner.

A graduate of Keio University, Takeda excelled in sports, including rugby and ice hockey. He married the daughter of Shigeru Okada, the president of Mitsukoshi Department Stores soon after graduation. The couple have two children.

Takeda worked as a businessman for the general trading company Itochu from 1967 to 2005, and was president of Chuo Setsubi Engineering, a food processing company, from 2005 to 2007.

From August 7, 2007, Takeda became Japanese ambassador and Plenipotentiary to Bulgaria.
