= Prince Tsunehisa Takeda =

Japanese politician

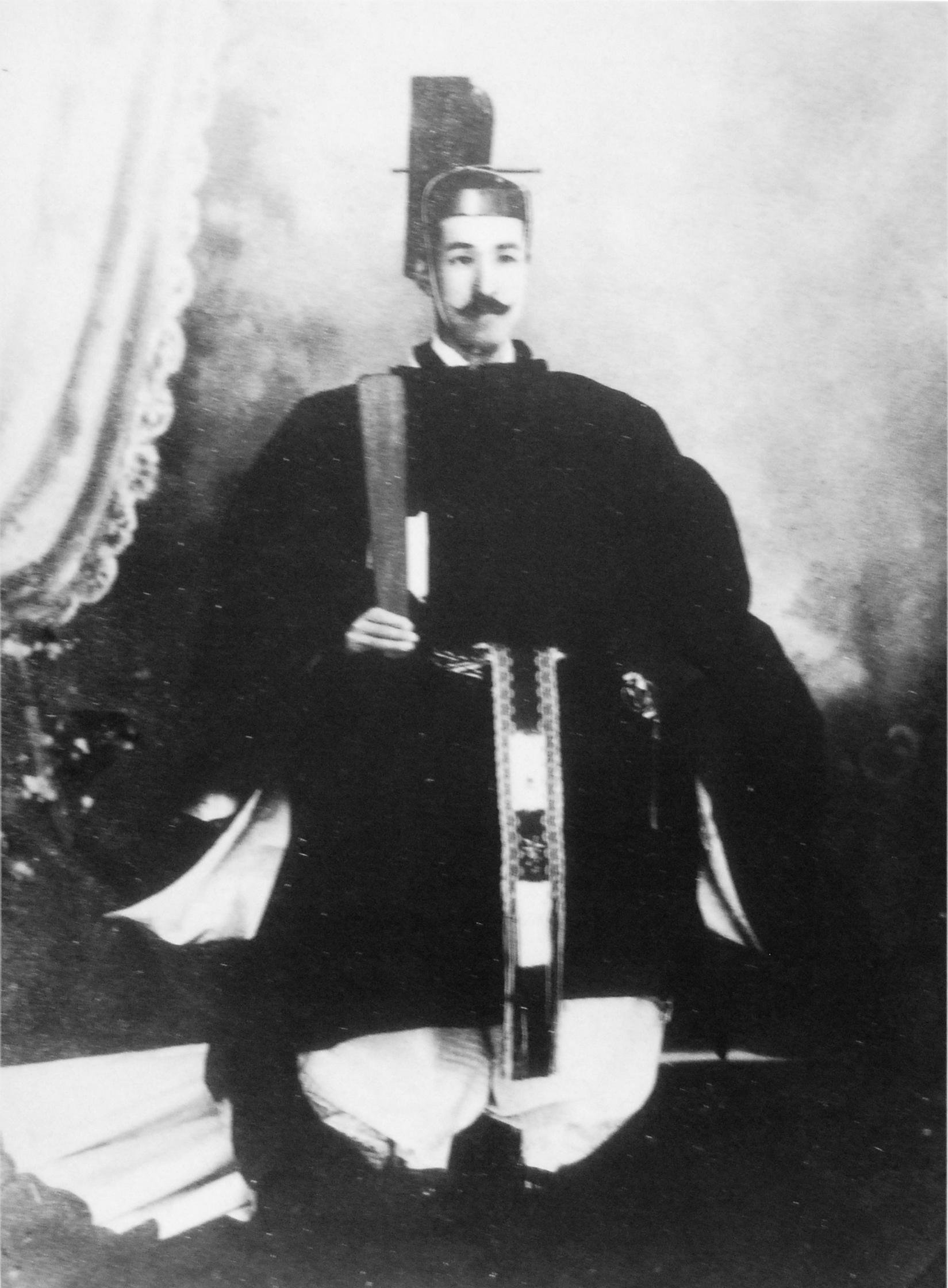
- Prince Tsunehisa Takeda in formal court dress
- Born: September 22, 1882; Kyoto, Japan
- Died: April 23, 1919 (aged 36); Tokyo, Japan
- Spouses: Masako, Princess Tsune (m. 1908)
- Issue: Prince Tsuneyoshi Takeda; Princess Ayako Takeda
- Father: Prince Kitashirakawa Yoshihisa
- Mother: Saruhashi Sacihko
- Religion: Shinto
- Military career
- Allegiance: Empire of Japan
- Branch: Imperial Japanese Army
- Service years: 1903 –1919
- Rank: Major General
- Conflicts: Russo-Japanese War
- Other work: House of Peers

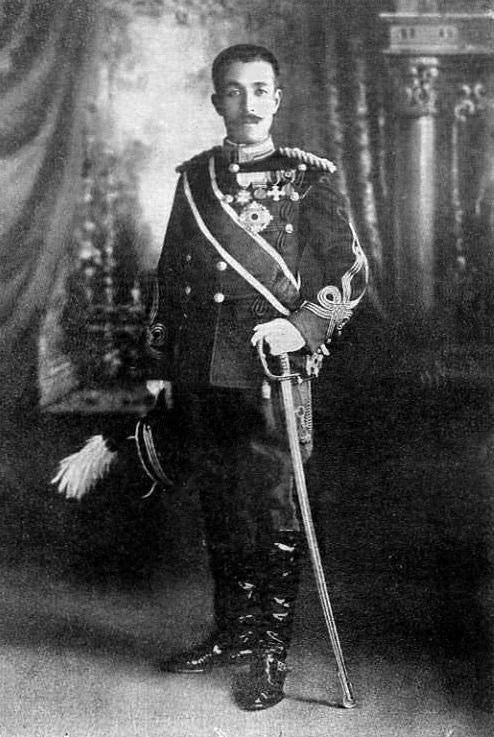
Prince Takeda in military uniform

Prince Tsunehisa Takeda (竹田宮恒久王, Takeda-no-miya Tsunehisa-ō; September 22, 1882 – April 23, 1919) was the founder of the Takeda-no-miya collateral branch of the Japanese Imperial Family.

== Biography ==
Prince Tsunehisa Takeda was the eldest son of Prince Kitashirakawa Yoshihisa and thus the brother of Prince Kitashirakawa Naruhisa. He was born in Kyoto in 1882. In 1902, he served in the House of Peers, and on November 30, 1903 graduated from the 15th class of the Imperial Japanese Army Academy. Due to his status, he was awarded the rank of major general in the Guards Cavalry Regiment and served with distinction in the Russo-Japanese War. It is commonly stated that he was standing next to Lieutenant Yoshinaga Nanbu, the 42nd chieftain of the Nanbu clan, during the Battle of Mukden when the latter was hit by a Russian bullet and died in combat; however, this incident occurred on March 4, 1905, after Prince Tsunehisa had been recalled to Japan.

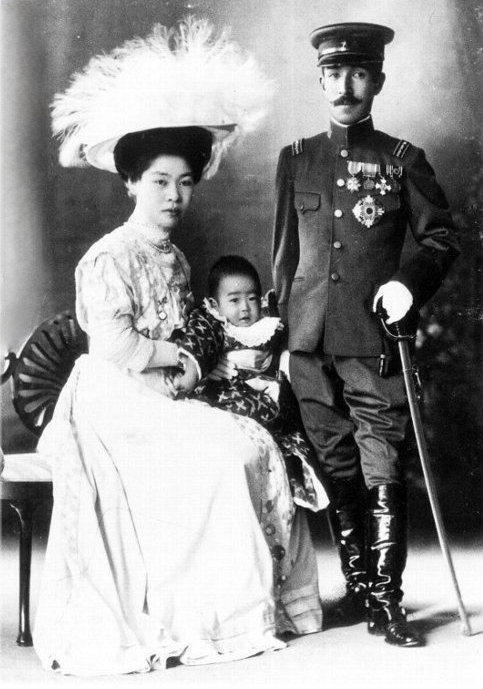
Prince Tsunehisa Takeda and his family

In 1906, he was authorized to take the name of "Takeda" and to start a branch house of the imperial family in March 1906,. He was wed to Emperor Meiji's sixth daughter Masako, Princess Tsune on April 30, 1908. He continued to pursue a military career, graduating from the 22nd class of the Army War College in 1910. He returned to the House of Peers in 1919. However, in April of the same year, he died during the worldwide epidemic of the Spanish influenza. Due to his death, the coming-of-age ceremony for his nephew-in-law, Prince Hirohito had to be postponed by one year to 1920.

== Decorations ==
- 1903 – Order of the Rising Sun with Paulownia Flowers
- 1906 – Order of the Golden Kite, 5th class
- 1913 – Grand Cordon of the Order of the Chrysanthemum

== Family ==
Prince Tsunehisa Takeda had a son and a daughter:

1. Prince Tsuneyoshi Takeda (竹田宮恒徳王, Takeda-no-miya Tsuneyoshi ō) (1909–1992)
2. Princess Ayako Takeda (禮子女王, Ayako Joō), (1913–2003), married Count Sano Tsunemitsu.
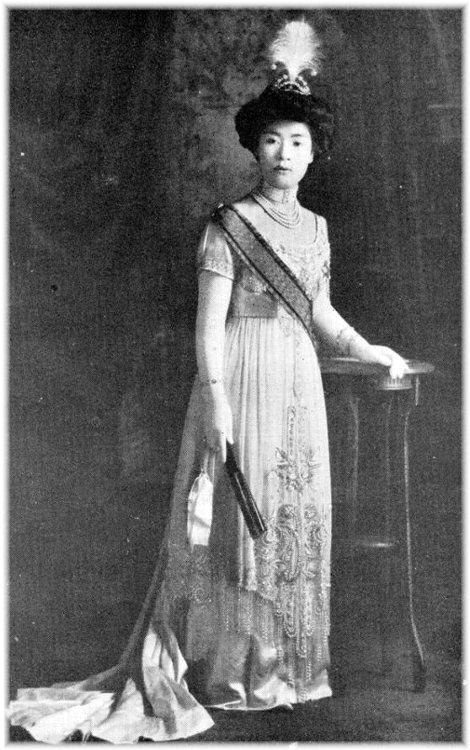
Princess Takeda Masako, wife

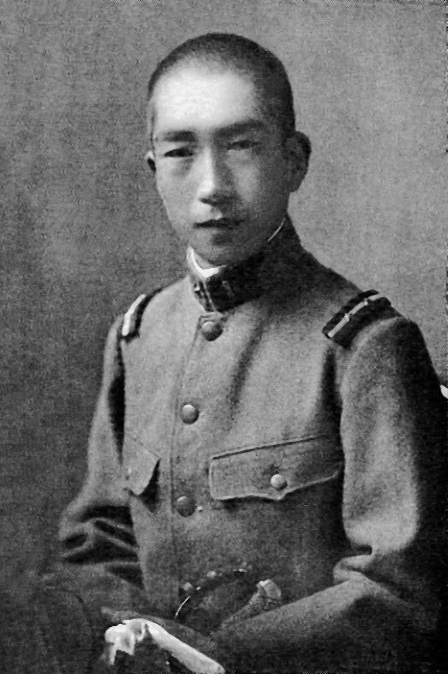
Prince Takeda Tsuneyoshi, son and heir

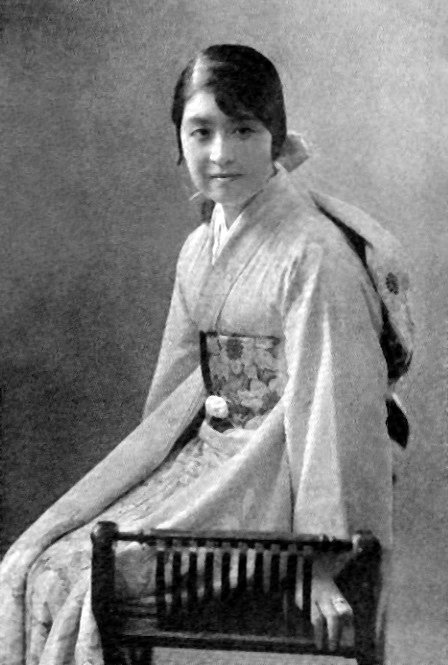
Princess Takeda Ayako, daughter

== Ancestry ==
Ancestors of Prince Tsunehisa Takeda

16. Prince Fushimi Kuniyori (1733-1802)
8. Prince Fushimi Sadayuki (1776-1841)
4. Prince Fushimi Kuniie (1802-1872)
2. Prince Kitashirakawa Yoshihisa (1847-1895)
10. Horiuchi Mamoru
5. Horiuchi Nobuko
1. Prince Takeda Tsunehisa
3. Saruhashi Sachiko
