= Takeda-no-miya =

Cadet branch of the Japanese Imperial Family

Takeda-no-miya 竹田宮家
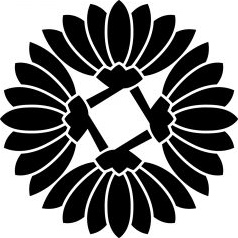
- Place of origin: Takanawa Minami, Shiba Ward, Tokyo City, Tokyo Prefecture, Empire of Japan
- Founder: Prince Tsunehisa Takeda

The Takeda (竹田) ōke (princely house) was the tenth and youngest branch of the Japanese imperial family created from branches of the Fushimi-no-miya house.

The Takeda-no-miya house was formed by Prince Tsunehisa, eldest son of Prince Kitashirakawa Yoshihisa (second Kitashirakawa-no-miya). He received the title Prince Takeda (Takeda-no-miya) and authorization to start a new branch of the Imperial Family in 1906.

	Name	Born .	Succeeded	Retired	Died
1	Prince Takeda Tsunehisa (竹田宮 恒久王, Takeda-no-miya Tsunehisa-ō)	1882	1906	.	1919
2	Prince Tsuneyoshi Takeda (竹田宮 恒徳王, Takeda-no-miya Tsuneyoshi-ō)	1909	1919	1947	1992
3	Takeda Tsunetada (竹田 恒正, Takeda Tsunetada)	1940	1992	.	.
