= Prince Naruhisa Kitashirakawa =

Japanese prince

Naruhisa
- Born: 18 April 1887; Tokyo, Japan
- Died: 1 April 1923 (aged 35); Perriers-la-Campagne, France
- Military career
- Spouse: Fusako, Princess Kane (m. 1909)
- Allegiance: Empire of Japan
- Branch: Imperial Japanese Army
- Service years: 1908–1923
- Rank: Colonel

Naruhisa, Prince Kitashirakawa (北白川宮成久王, Kitashirakawa-no-miya Naruhisa-ō; 18 April 1887 – 1 April 1923), was the 3rd head of a collateral branch of the Japanese Imperial Family and the husband of Fusako, Princess Kane, daughter of Emperor Meiji and Concubine Sono Sachiko.

== Early life ==
Prince Naruhisa was the son of Prince Yoshihisa Kitashirakawa and Princess Tomiko. Prince Naruhisa succeeded as head of the house of Kitashirakawa-no-miya after the death of his father in November 1895 during the First Sino-Japanese War. He was the brother of Prince Tsunehisa Takeda and classmate of Prince Yasuhiko Asaka, Prince Naruhiko Higashikuni and Prince Fumimaro Konoe (peer). Prince Naruhisa graduated from the 20th class of the Imperial Japanese Army Academy with a commission as a sub-lieutenant in 1904, and the 27th class of the Army Staff College with the rank of colonel. His field of study was artillery.

== Marriage and family ==
On 29 April 1909, Prince Kitashirakawa married Fusako, Princess Kane (1890–1974), the seventh daughter of Emperor Meiji. Prince and Princess Kitashirakawa had one son and three daughters:

1. Prince Nagahisa Kitashirakawa (北白川宮永久王, Higashikuni Nagahisa-ō; 1910–1940) Married Sachiko Tokugawa
2. Princess Mineko Kitashirakawa (美年子女王, Mineko Joō; 1910–1970); Married Viscount Tanekatsu Tachibana
3. Princess Sawako Kitashirakawa (佐和子女王, Sawako Joō; 1913–2001); Married Viscount Motofumi Higashizono
4. Princess Taeko Kitashirakawa (多惠子女王, Taeko Joō; 1920–1954); Married Yoshihisa Tokugawa.

== Later life ==
Between 1922 and 1923, Prince Naruhisa studied military tactics at the École Spéciale Militaire de Saint-Cyr in France, along with his cousins Prince Naruhiko Higashikuni and Prince Yasuhiko Asaka. However, on 1 April 1923, he was killed in Perriers-la-Campagne, a Paris suburb, in an automobile accident that seriously injured Princess Kitashirakawa (who had accompanied her husband to Paris), and which left Prince Asaka with a limp for the rest of his life.

Dowager Princess Kitashirakawa became a commoner on 14 October 1947, with the abolition of the collateral branches of the Japanese Imperial Family by the American occupation authorities. The former princess served as custodian and chief priestess of the Ise Shrine until her death on 11 August 1974.

== Gallery ==
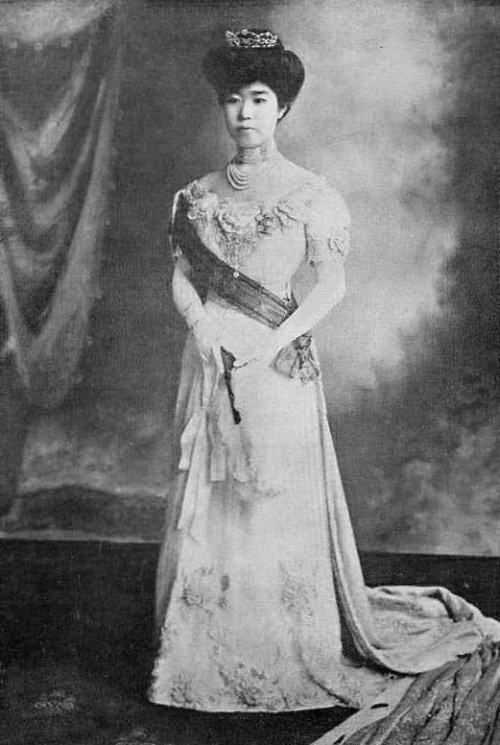
Princess Fusako (wife), daughter of Emperor Meiji

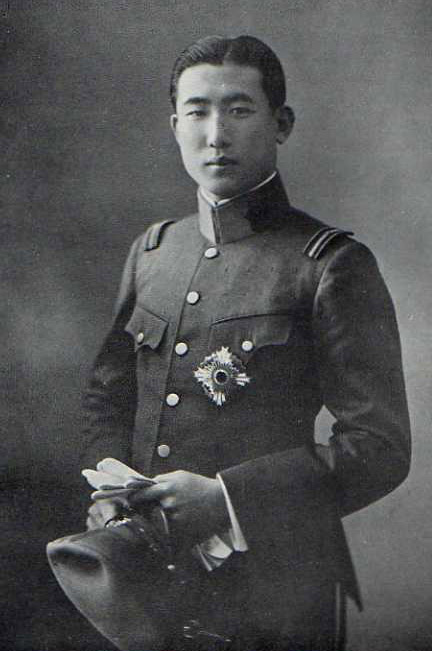
Prince Nagahisa (son)

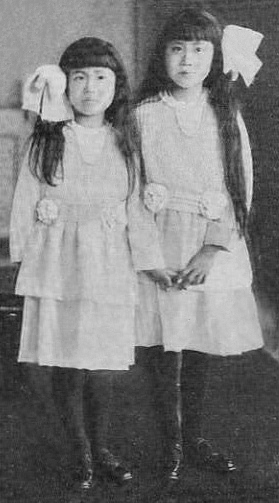
Princesses Mineko and Sawako (daughters)

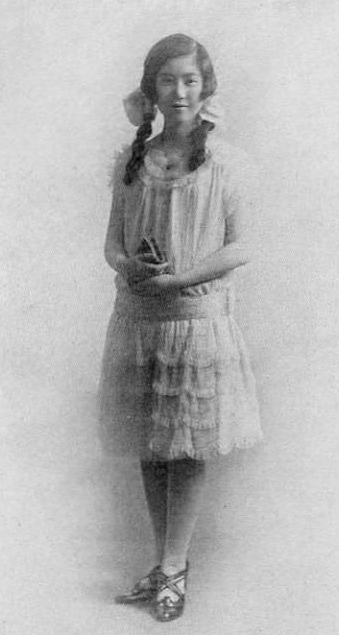
Princess Mineko

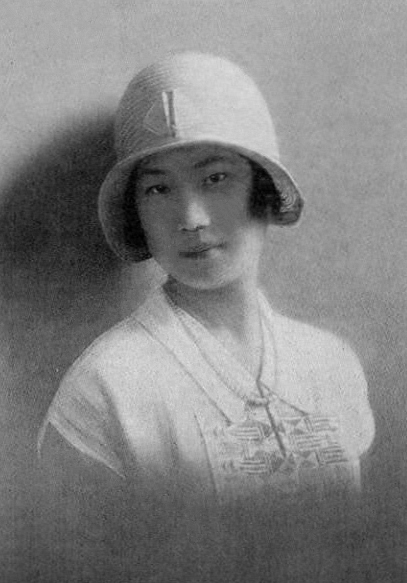
Princess Sawako

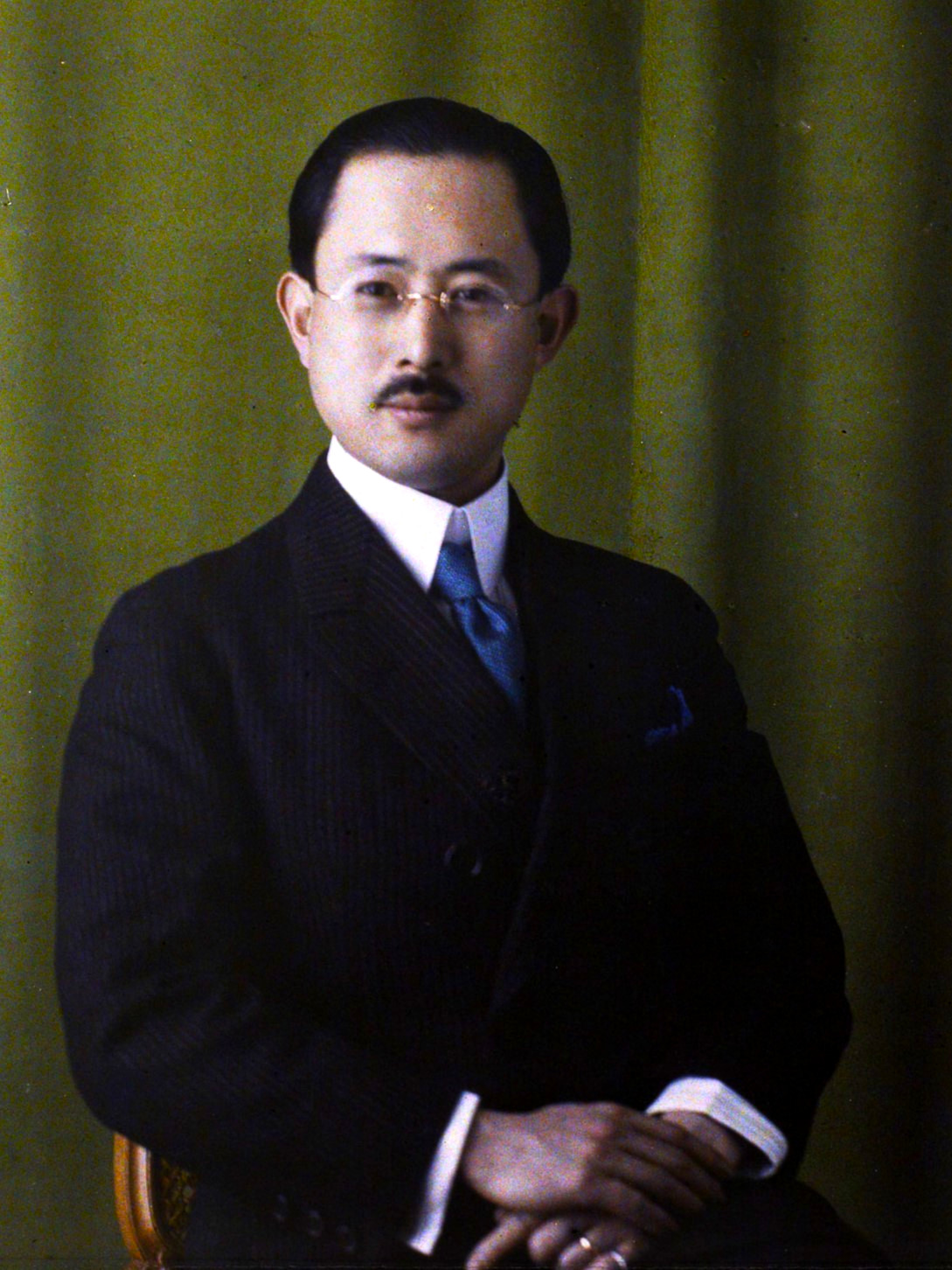
Prince Naruhisa, 1922 Autochrome by Auguste Léon

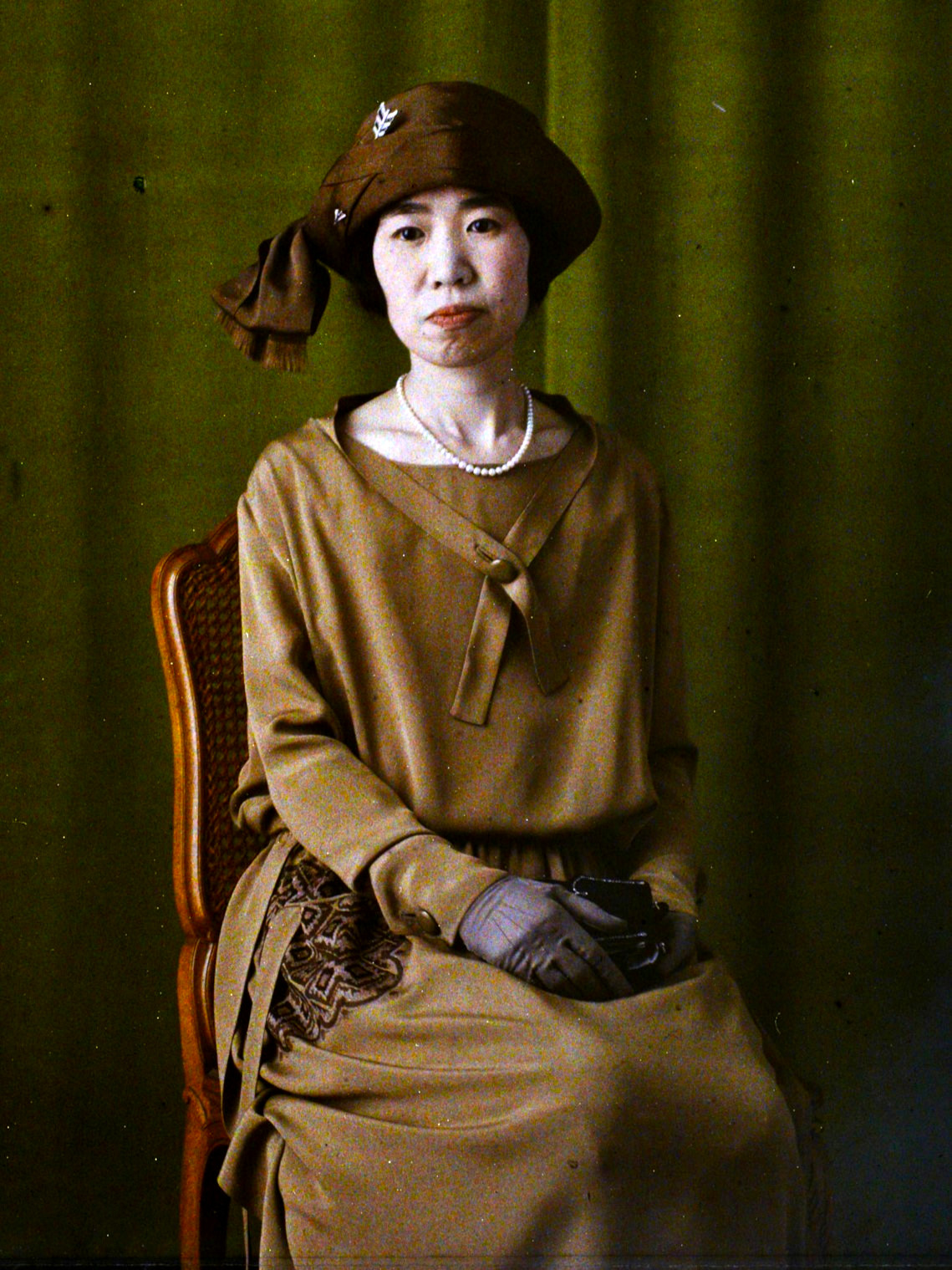
Princess Fusako, 1922 Autochrome by Auguste Léon
