= Jacques-Désiré Laval =

French Roman Catholic missionary in Mauritius

Blessed Jacques-Désiré Laval CSSp
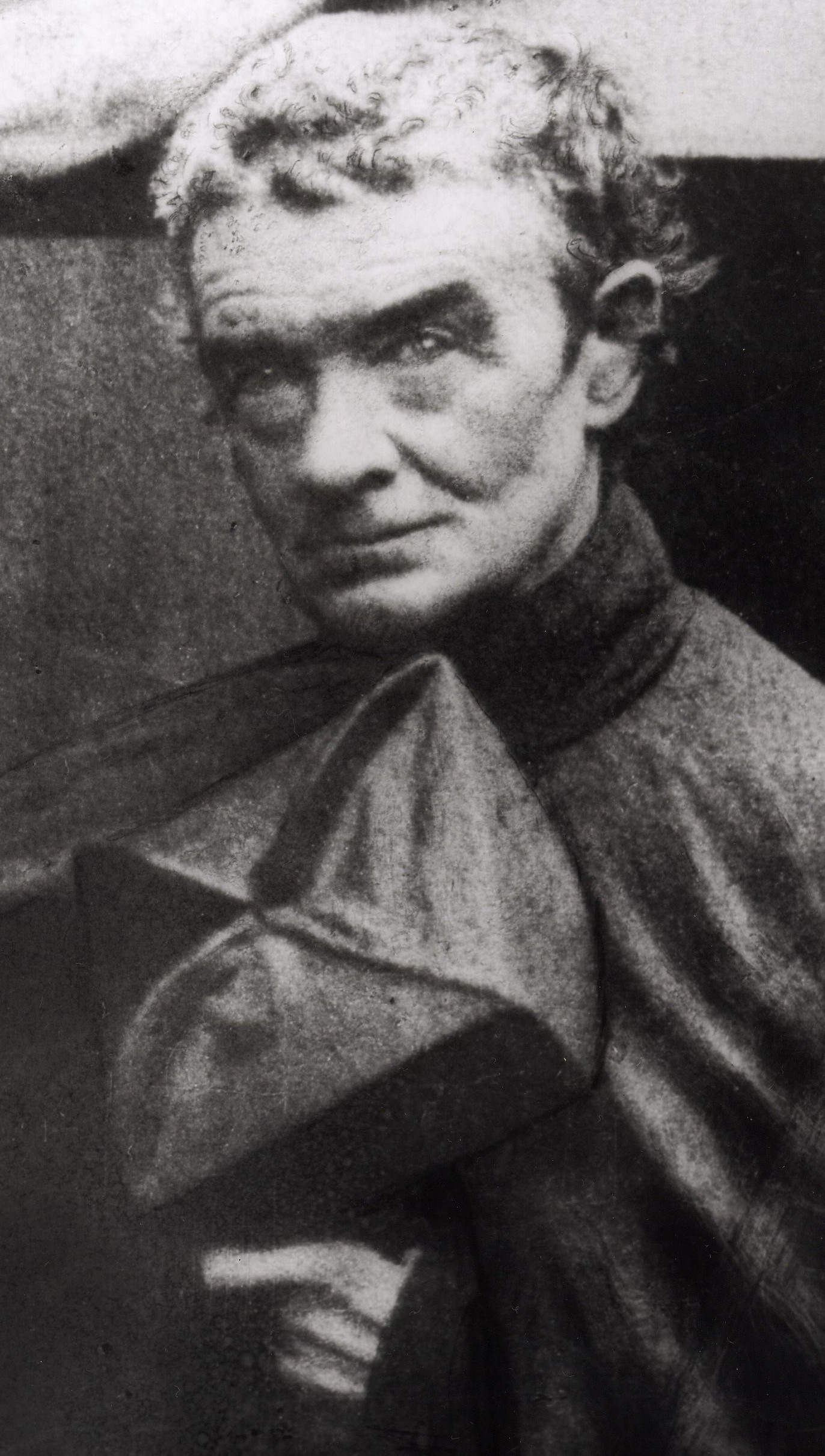
- Photograph in March 1860.
- Born: 18 September 1803; Croth, Eure, France
- Died: 9 September 1864 (aged 60); Port Louis, Mauritius
- Venerated in: Roman Catholic Church
- Beatified: 29 April 1979, Saint Peter's Square, Vatican City by Pope John Paul II
- Major shrine: Sainte-Croix, Mauritius
- Feast: 9 September

Jacques-Désiré Laval (18 September 1803 – 9 September 1864) was a French religious priest of the Congregation of the Holy Spirit, who served in the missions in Mauritius. He is known as the "Apostle of Mauritius" due to his tireless work in aiding the poor and ill. Laval also educated the flock he was assigned to for those people were uneducated and were former slaves for the most part. His skills in medicine made him a distinguished figure in the region since his expertise allowed him to tend to those who suffered illness that manifested more so during times of an epidemic.

On 29 April 1979 he became the first beatified member of his religious order.

== Life ==
Jacques-Désiré Laval was born on 18 September 1803 in Croth, the son of Jacques Laval, successful farmer. His parents had three daughters before him and hoped for a boy. He grew up in a pious household. His mother died when he was seven. His uncle Nicolas was a priest and oversaw his religious instruction.

Laval was educated at Évreux and at the Collège Stanislas de Paris where he studied humanities. He was uncertain whether to pursue ecclesial studies for the priesthood or pursue the practice of medicine and he received his medical doctorate on 21 August 1830 before setting up a practice in Saint-André and Ivry-la-Bataille. His thesis that secured his doctorate was on rheumatoid arthritis. But he became more vain and was ignoring the spiritual things in life as he served in medicine from September 1830 to April 1834. He reexamined his choice after a near-fatal riding accident. Feeling he was called to the priesthood he closed his practice a few months later in 1834 and began his studies for the priesthood in Saint-Sulpice on 15 June 1835; he received his ordination on 22 December 1838 (from the Archbishop of Paris Hyacinthe-Louis de Quélen) and worked as a parish priest until 1840. During his ecclesial studies he befriended François Libermann (the two later collaborated in the missions). He desired a more active life as a priest and therefore entered the Spiritans. He was sent to the missions on the island of Mauritius on 14 September 1841.

Most of his parishioners were poor and uneducated former slaves. He lived with them and learned their language while also fasting when supplies were short; he slept in a packing crate. His medical training was useful in this regard as he worked to improve conditions in agriculture as well as science and sanitation. His success is said to have been so great that it is believed to have converted 67 000 people in his parish.

Laval died in 1864 after a series of apoplectic attacks. The funeral oration commented on the words of Isaiah: Evangelizare pauperibus misit me — "He sent me to announce the Gospel to the poor". The casket had 30 000 people following it and was buried opposite the church in Sainte Croix.

=== Memorials ===
There is a building on the campus at the Spiritans' Duquesne University in Pittsburgh - which is named "Laval House" in honor of Father Laval.

== Beatification ==
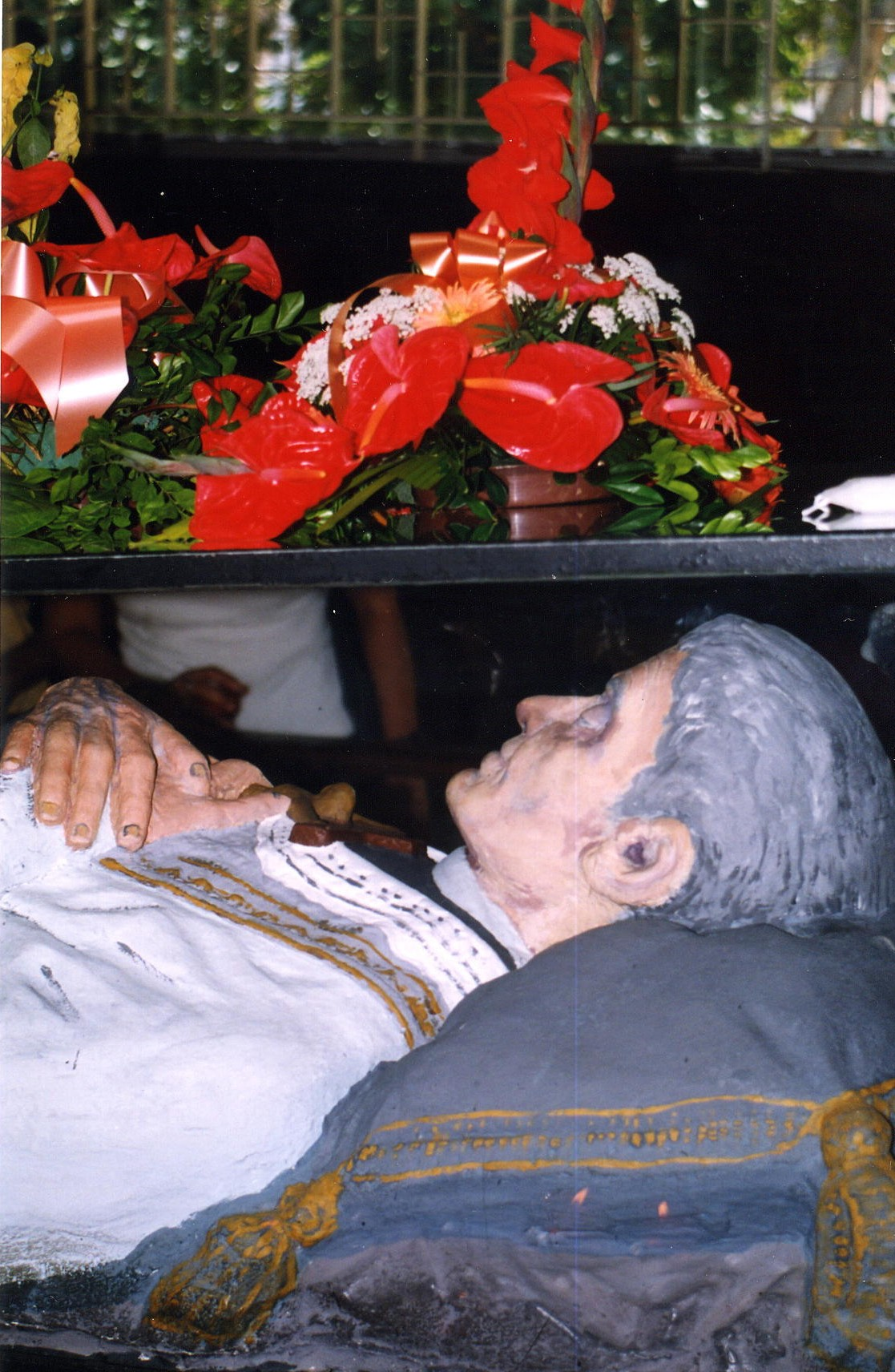
Laval's tomb

The cause for beatification commenced in both Évreux and Port Louis on a diocesan level before theologians investigated and approved his spiritual writings on 9 August 1916. The formal introduction to the cause came on 26 June 1918 under Pope Benedict XV and he was titled as a Servant of God. The second diocesan process was later conducted and these two processes received validation in Rome from the Congregation for Rites on 5 June 1936 upon their completion. Officials from the C.O.R. approved the documents related to the cause on 15 October 1957 before the Congregation for the Causes of Saints and their consultants approved it later on 17 November 1970. The C.C.S. then granted their approval on 21 December 1971 before having to bring it to the pope for final confirmation. That confirmation from Pope Paul VI on 22 June 1972 allowed for Laval to be titled as Venerable, acknowledging that Laval led a life of heroic virtue.

The cognitional process for a miracle opened and closed in Mauritius in 1926 before it received C.C.S. validation in Rome later on 6 December 1973. The miracle that led to his beatification was the 17 July 1923 cure of Joseph Edgradi Beaubois - an Anglican who later converted - from acute eczema on his face and neck. Medical experts approved this healing to be a miracle on 4 December 1975 as did the C.C.S. and their consultants on 18 January 1977; the C.C.S. held another session and approved it on 22 February 1977. Paul VI confirmed this miracle on 7 July 1977 and thus approved Laval's beatification. But the death of Paul VI and the later death of Pope John Paul I prevented the beatification from being celebrated in late 1978 as was intended. The beatification was not celebrated until Pope John Paul II presided over it on 29 April 1979.

John Paul II visited Laval's tomb in Mauritius on 14 October 1989.

The current postulator for this cause is the Spiritan priest Jean-Jacques Boeglin.

The date of Laval's death has become an annual celebration of sorts in which it was marked with a festival and a procession to the site of his tomb. The annual pilgrimage to the parish church of Sainte-Croix originated on the date of his funeral procession in 1864. On an annual level offerings and ex votos are placed at the site of his tomb from the night of 8 September until the end of his feast.
