= Bois-le-Roi =

Bois-le-Roi may refer to:

- Bois-le-Roi, Eure, a commune in Eure département, France
- Bois-le-Roi, Seine-et-Marne, a commune in Seine-et-Marne département, France
