= Saint-Germain-de-Fresney =

- Commune
- Location of Saint-Germain-de-Fresney
- Location within France Location within Normandy
- Coordinates: 48°57′36″N 1°17′34″E
- Country: France
- Region: Normandy
- Department: Eure
- Arrondissement: Évreux
- Canton: Saint-André-de-l'Eure
- Intercommunality: CA Évreux Portes de Normandie

Government
  - Mayor (2020–2026): Max Confais
- Area^{1}: 5.35 km^{2} (2.07 sq mi)
- Elevation: 152 m (499 ft)
- Highest elevation: 151 m (495 ft)
- Lowest elevation: 129 m (423 ft)
- Population (2023): 191
  - Density: 35.7/km^{2} (92.5/sq mi)
- Time zone: UTC+01:00 (CET)
  - Summer (DST): UTC+02:00 (CEST)
- INSEE/Postal code: 27544 /27220
- Website: saintgermaindefresney.fr
- ^{1} French Land Register data, which excludes lakes, ponds, glaciers > 1 km^{2} (0.386 sq mi or 247 acres) and river estuaries.

Saint-Germain-de-Fresney (French pronunciation: [sɛ̃ ʒɛʁmɛ̃ də fʁɛnɛ], literally Saint-Germain of Fresney) is a commune in the Eure department in Normandy in northern France.

== Population ==
Historical population
Year	Pop.	±% p.a.
1968	111	—
1975	85	−3.74%
1982	122	+5.30%
1990	129	+0.70%
1999	154	+1.99%
2007	151	−0.25%
2012	224	+8.21%
2017	206	−1.66%
2023	191	−1.25%
Source: INSEE

== See also ==
- Communes of the Eure department
