= Mouette =

Mouette is a French word for seagull (cognate to mew). It can refer to:

- La Mouette, French aircraft manufacturer
- Automobiles Mouette, French automobile company in the 1920s
- Operation Mouette, 1953 French military operation in Vietnam
- The name given to the Stadler FLIRT train sets for SBB Switzerland

== See also ==
- Mouettes, commune in Eure, Haute-Normandie
- Mouettes Genevoises Navigation, Swiss transport organization
