= Garencières =

- Part of La Baronnie
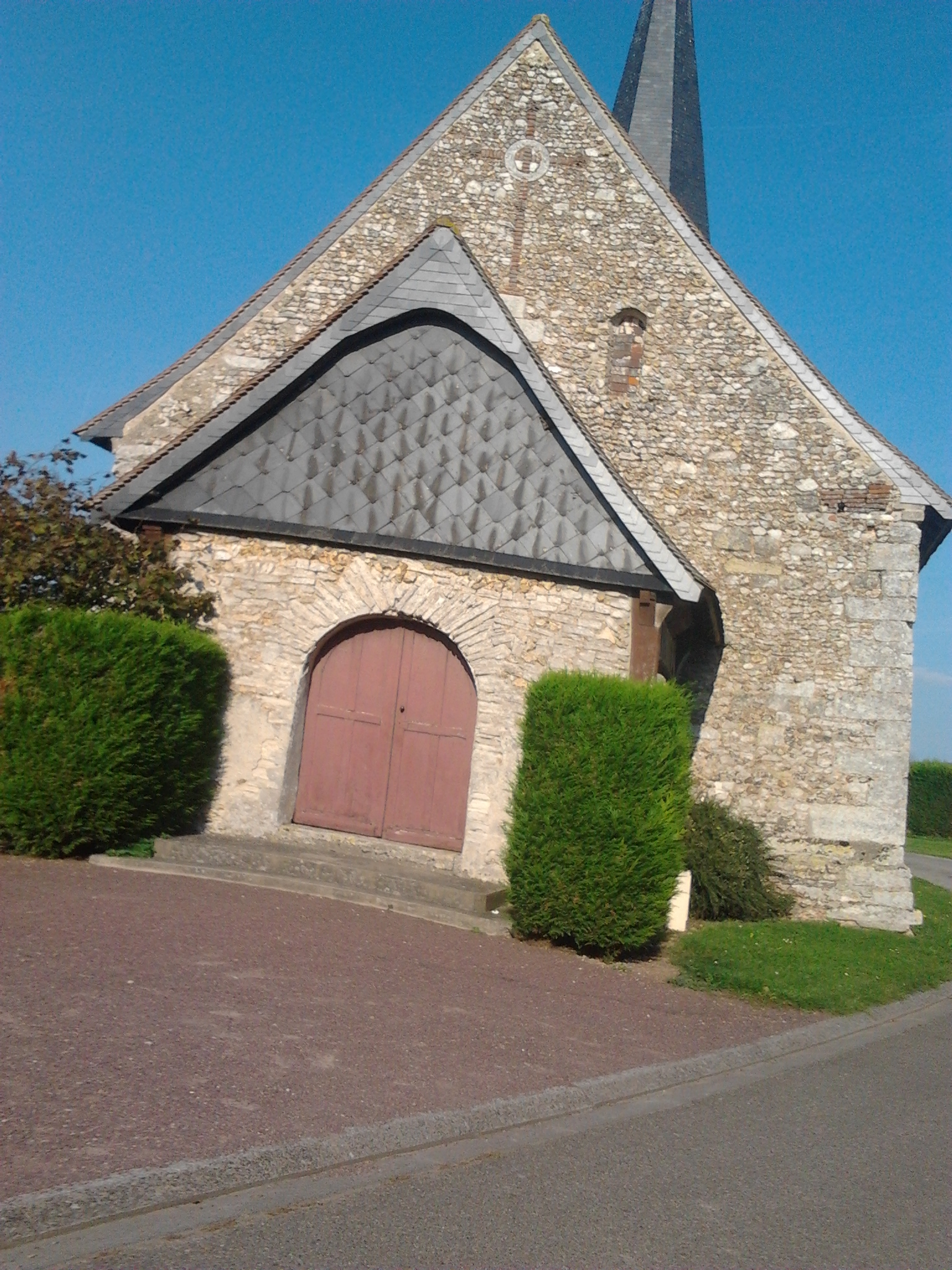

- Coat of arms
- Location of Garencières
- Location within France Location within Normandy
- Coordinates: 48°57′28″N 1°15′58″E
- Country: France
- Region: Normandy
- Department: Eure
- Arrondissement: Évreux
- Canton: Saint-André-de-l'Eure
- Commune: La Baronnie
- Area^{1}: 6.87 km^{2} (2.65 sq mi)
- Elevation: 152 m (499 ft)
- Highest elevation: 150 m (490 ft)
- Lowest elevation: 134 m (440 ft)
- Population (2023): 656
  - Density: 95.5/km^{2} (247/sq mi)
- Time zone: UTC+01:00 (CET)
  - Summer (DST): UTC+02:00 (CEST)
- Postal code: 27220
- ^{1} French Land Register data, which excludes lakes, ponds, glaciers > 1 km^{2} (0.386 sq mi or 247 acres) and river estuaries.

Garencières (French pronunciation: [ɡaʁɑ̃sjɛʁ]) is a former commune in the Eure department in northern France. On 1 January 2016, it was merged into the new commune of La Baronnie.

== See also ==
- Communes of the Eure department
