= Pere Laval R.C.A School =

Pere Laval R.C.A

Location
- Allee Pere Laval; Port Louis, Port Louis; Mauritius

Information
- Type: Public
- Established: 1864
- Colour: Blue
- Mascot: Jacques-Désiré Laval
- Team name: Jacques-Désiré Laval

Pere Laval R.C.A School (Ecole Père Laval RCA) is a primary school in Sainte-Croix, Port Louis District, Mauritius, Africa operated by the Le Diocèse de Port-Louis, a Catholic organization.
