= Quessigny =

- Part of La Baronnie
- Location of Quessigny
- Location within France Location within Normandy
- Coordinates: 48°55′54″N 1°16′16″E
- Country: France
- Region: Normandy
- Department: Eure
- Arrondissement: Évreux
- Canton: Saint-André-de-l'Eure
- Commune: La Baronnie
- Area^{1}: 4.35 km^{2} (1.68 sq mi)
- Elevation: 152 m (499 ft)
- Highest elevation: 152 m (499 ft)
- Lowest elevation: 139 m (456 ft)
- Population (2023): 115
  - Density: 26.4/km^{2} (68.5/sq mi)
- Time zone: UTC+01:00 (CET)
  - Summer (DST): UTC+02:00 (CEST)
- Postal code: 27220
- ^{1} French Land Register data, which excludes lakes, ponds, glaciers > 1 km^{2} (0.386 sq mi or 247 acres) and river estuaries.

Quessigny (French pronunciation: [kɛsiɲi]) is a former commune in the Eure department in Normandy in northern France. On 1 January 2016, it was merged into the new commune of La Baronnie.

== See also ==
- Communes of the Eure department
