= Jumelles =

Jumelles may refer to:

- Jumelles, Eure, a commune in the department of Eure, France
- Les Jumelles, a summit in the Swiss Alps
- "Jumelles", a song by MC Solaar on the 2003 album Mach 6
