= Serez =

Serez may refer to:

- Serez, Eure, a commune in the department of Eure, France
- Serres, a city in the Greek region of Macedonia
