= Funiculaire du Havre =

Funicular railway line in Le Havre, France

Coordinates: 49°29′58″N 0°6′45″E

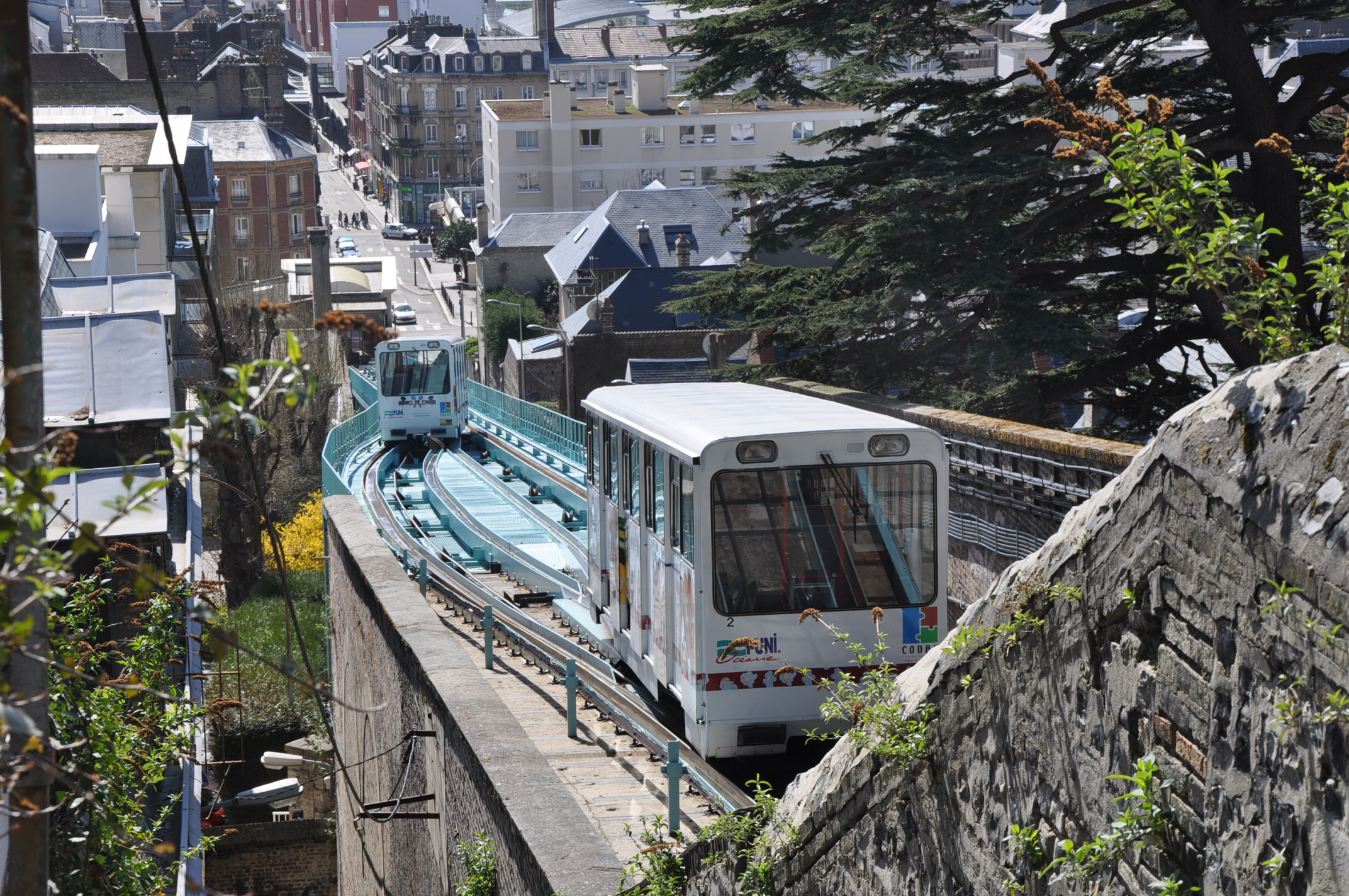

Overview
- Locale: Le Havre, Upper Normandy
- Transit type: Funicular
- Number of lines: 1
- Number of stations: 2
- Daily ridership: 1,315 (2006)

Operation
- Began operation: 1890
- Operator: Transdev

Technical
- System length: 0.77 km (0.48 mi)
- Track gauge: 4 ft 8 1/2 in (1,435 mm) standard gauge
System map
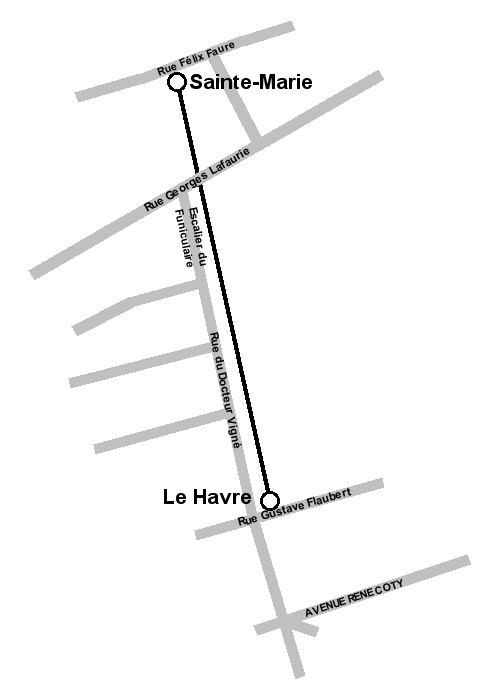

The Funiculaire du Havre (English: Funicular of Le Havre) is a funicular railway line in the French port city of Le Havre.

The line is incorporated in the city's public transport network and operated by Bus Océane. It runs between Le Havre (Rue Gustave Flaubert) and the Côte Sainte-Marie (Rue Félix Faure) and includes a tunnel, a loop and a 41% incline.

The line was built and opened in 1890 by the Compagnie Générale Française de Tramways (CGFT). Until 1911, it was operated by unreliable steam coaches. In 1911, it was recabled and electrified.

Le Havre - Sainte-Marie	1,435 mm (4 ft 8 1/2 in) gauge
Length	343 m (1,125 ft)
Height	77 m (253 ft)
Number of stops	2
Fleet	2 funicular cars
Capacity	unknown
Length of journey	3 minutes
Opening times	7h30 to 19h30
Frequency of services	6 to 10 minutes

== See also ==
- List of funicular railways
