= Prey, Eure =

Prey
- Commune
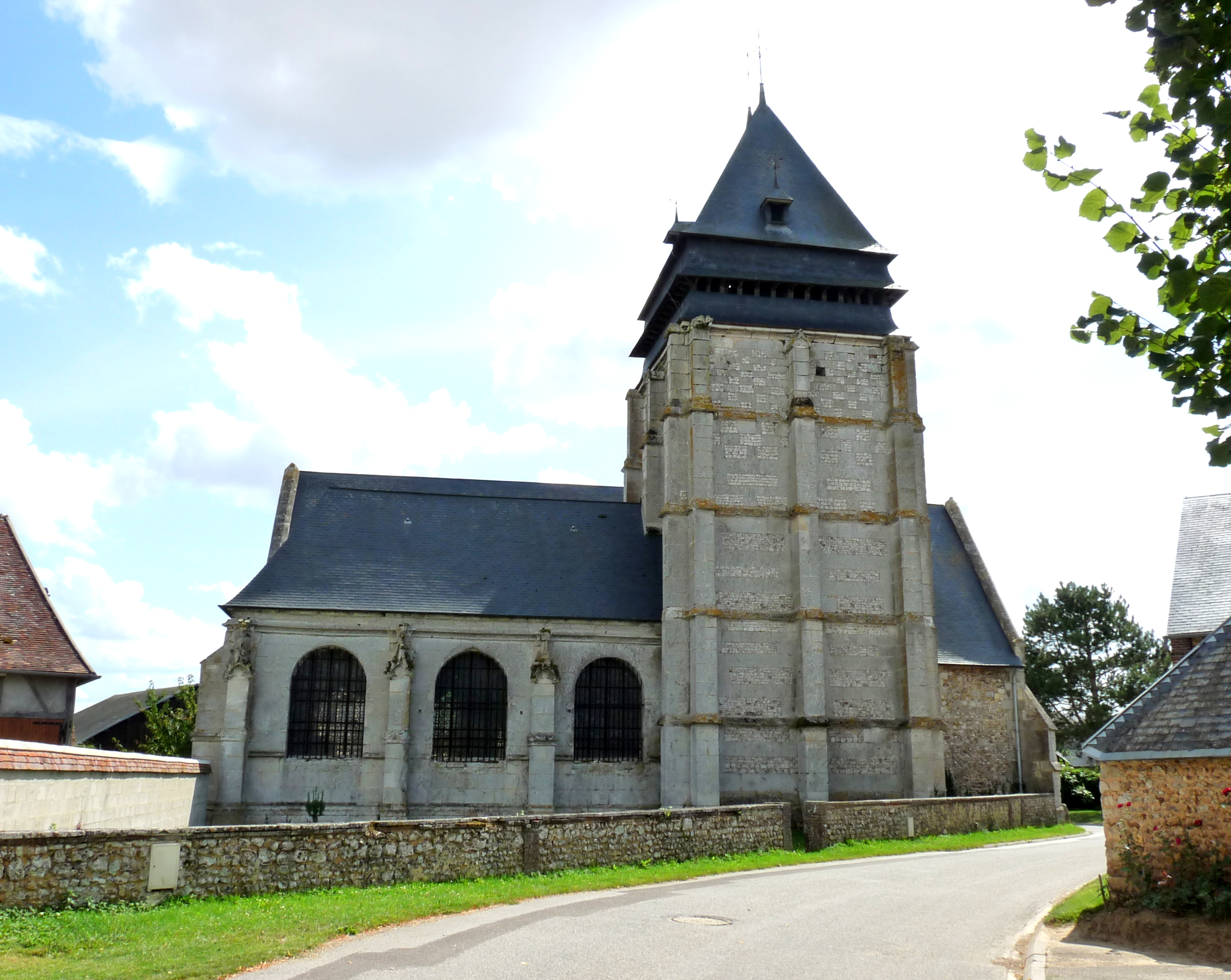
- The church in Prey

- Coat of arms
- Location of Prey
- Location within France Location within Normandy
- Coordinates: 48°57′52″N 1°12′53″E
- Country: France
- Region: Normandy
- Department: Eure
- Arrondissement: Évreux
- Canton: Saint-André-de-l'Eure
- Intercommunality: CA Évreux Portes de Normandie

Government
  - Mayor (2020–2026): Damien Voltolini
- Area^{1}: 8.09 km^{2} (3.12 sq mi)
- Elevation: 151 m (495 ft)
- Highest elevation: 147 m (482 ft)
- Lowest elevation: 135 m (443 ft)
- Population (2023): 953
  - Density: 118/km^{2} (305/sq mi)
- Time zone: UTC+01:00 (CET)
  - Summer (DST): UTC+02:00 (CEST)
- INSEE/Postal code: 27478 /27220
- ^{1} French Land Register data, which excludes lakes, ponds, glaciers > 1 km^{2} (0.386 sq mi or 247 acres) and river estuaries.

Prey (French pronunciation: [pʁɛ]) is a commune in the Eure department in Normandy in northern France.

== Population ==
Historical population
Year	Pop.	±% p.a.
1968	391	—
1975	775	+10.27%
1982	817	+0.76%
1990	841	+0.36%
1999	742	−1.38%
2007	847	+1.67%
2012	930	+1.89%
2017	950	+0.43%
2023	953	+0.05%
Source: INSEE

== See also ==
- Communes of the Eure department
