= La Baronnie =

- Commune
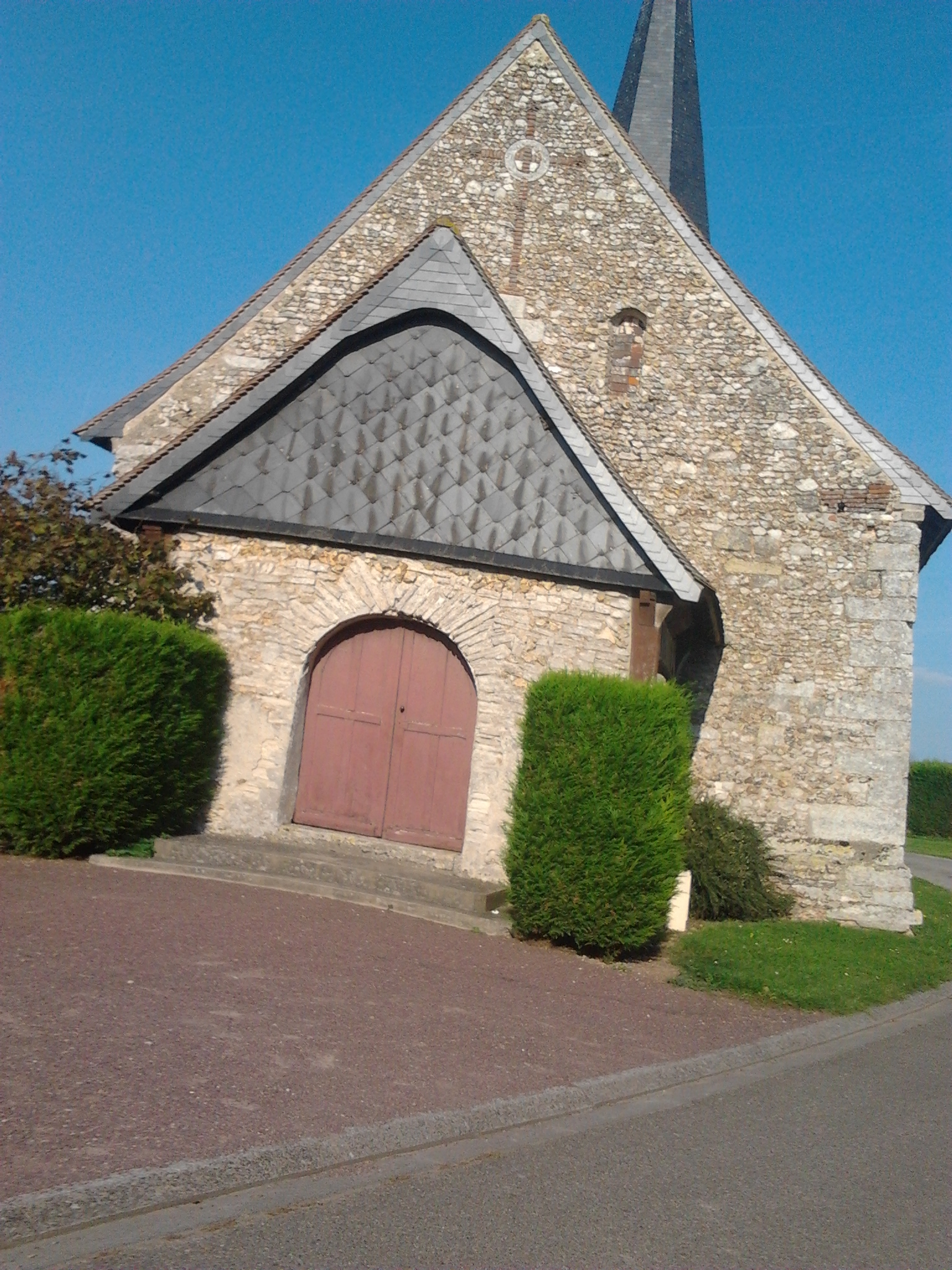
- The church in Garencières
- Location of La Baronnie
- Location within France Location within Normandy
- Coordinates: 48°57′22″N 1°15′54″E
- Country: France
- Region: Normandy
- Department: Eure
- Arrondissement: Évreux
- Canton: Saint-André-de-l'Eure
- Intercommunality: CA Évreux Portes de Normandie
- Area^{1}: 11.22 km^{2} (4.33 sq mi)
- Population (2023): 771
  - Density: 68.7/km^{2} (178/sq mi)
- Time zone: UTC+01:00 (CET)
  - Summer (DST): UTC+02:00 (CEST)
- INSEE/Postal code: 27277 /27220
- ^{1} French Land Register data, which excludes lakes, ponds, glaciers > 1 km^{2} (0.386 sq mi or 247 acres) and river estuaries.

La Baronnie (French pronunciation: [la baʁɔni]) is a commune in the department of Eure, northern France. The municipality was established on 1 January 2016 by merger of the former communes of Garencières and Quessigny.

== See also ==
- Communes of the Eure department
