= Upper Normandy =

Former administrative region in France

Coordinates: 49°30′N 1°00′E

Upper Normandy Haute-Normandie (French) Ĥâote-Normaundie (Norman)
- Flag

- Country: France
- Dissolved: 2016-01-01
- Prefecture: Rouen
- Departments: 2: Eure (27); Seine-Maritime (76)

Area
  - Total: 12,317 km^{2} (4,756 sq mi)

Population (2007-01-01)
  - Total: 1,915,000

GDP
  - Total: €66.654 billion (2024)
  - Per capita: €35,710 (2024)
- ISO 3166 code: FR-Q
- NUTS Region: FR2

Upper Normandy (French: Haute-Normandie, IPA: [ot nɔʁmɑ̃di]; Norman: Ĥâote-Normaundie) is a former administrative region of France. On 1 January 2016, Upper and Lower Normandy merged becoming one region called Normandy.

== History ==
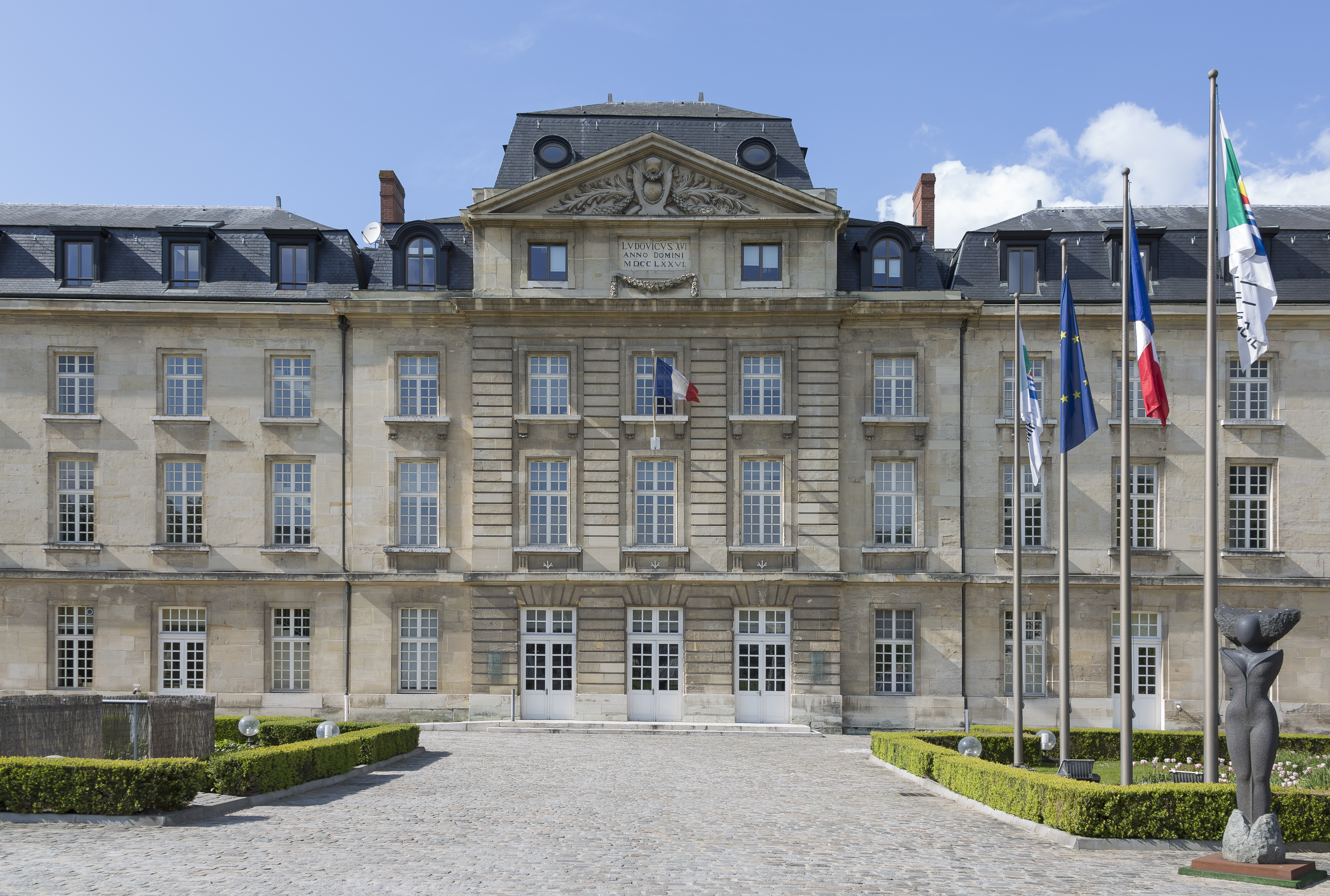
The Caserne Jeanne d'Arc in Rouen, seat of the Regional Council of Upper Normandy

The region has a long existence, but as an administrative region it was created in 1956 from two departments: Seine-Maritime and Eure, when Normandy was divided into the regions of Lower Normandy and Upper Normandy. This division continued to provoke controversy, and many people continued to call for the two regions to be reunited. The two regions were finally merged on 1 January 2016.

The name Upper Normandy existed prior to 1956 and referred by tradition to territories which were included within the administrative region: the Pays de Caux, the Pays de Bray (but not that of Picardy), the Roumois, the Campagne of Le Neubourg, the Plain of Saint-André and the Norman Vexin. Today, most of the Pays d'Auge, as well as a small portion of the Pays d'Ouche, are located in Lower Normandy. Rouen and Le Havre are its important urban centers.

== Major communities ==
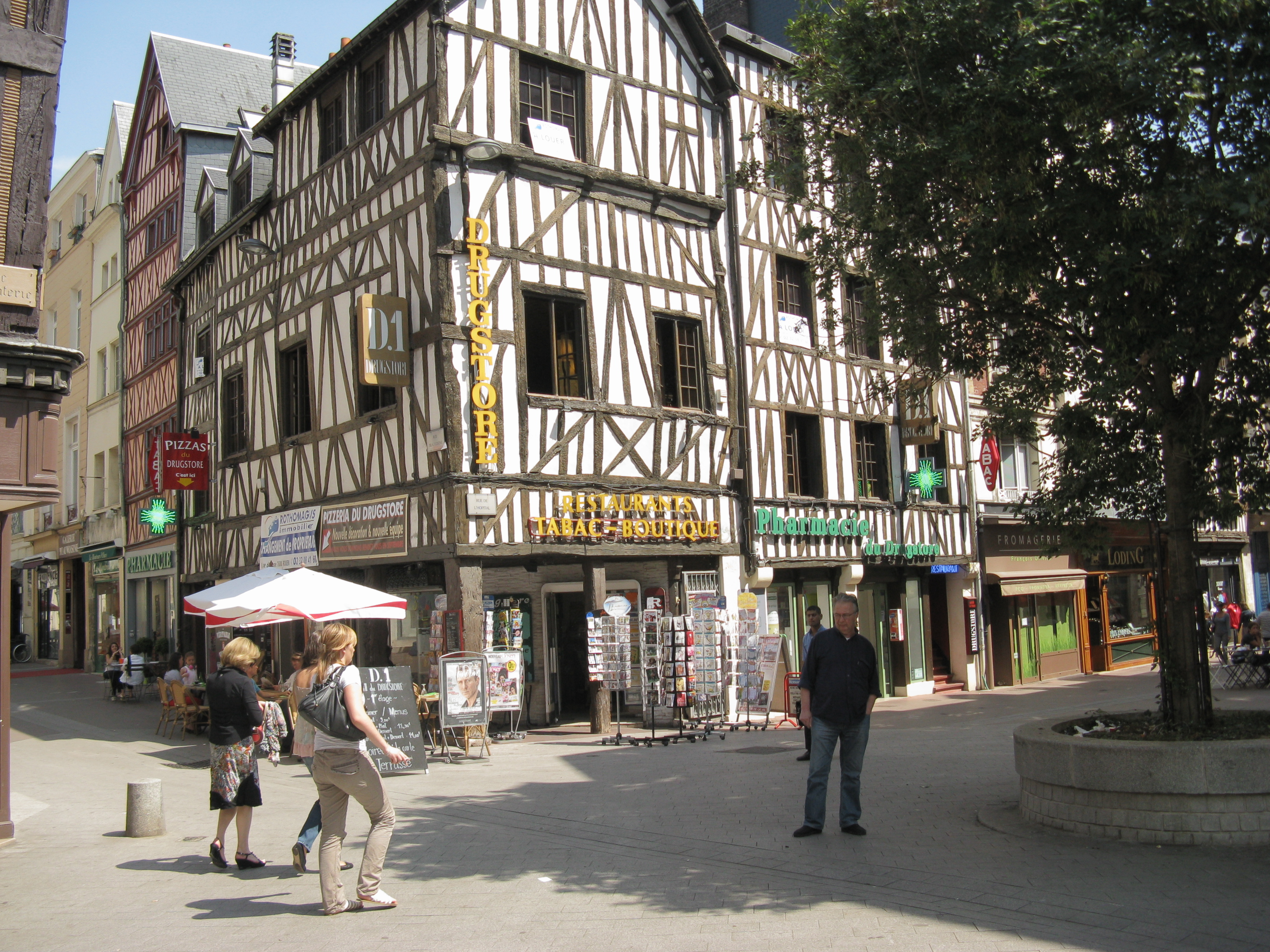
Rouen

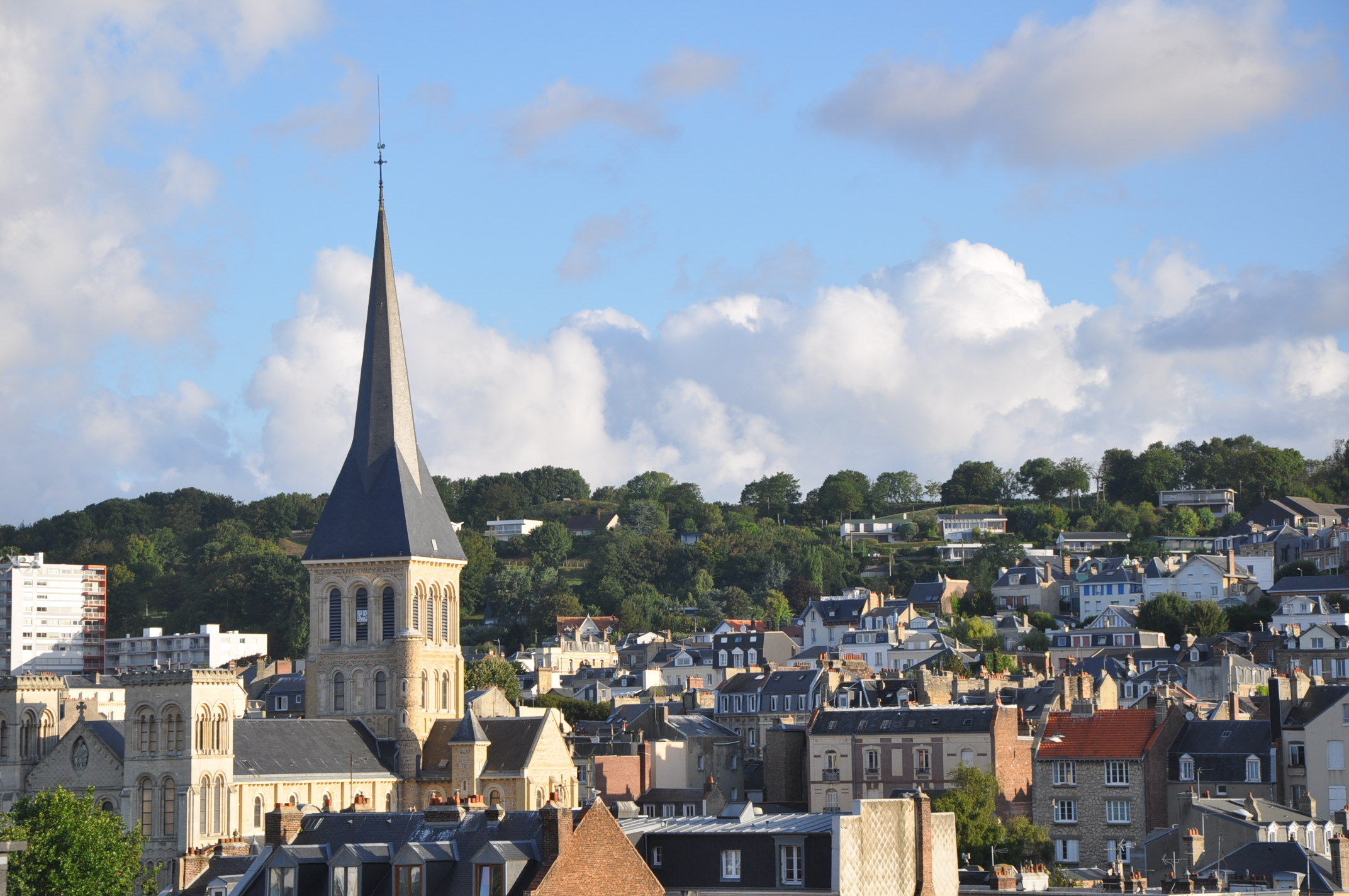
The Saint-Vincent neighborhood in Le Havre

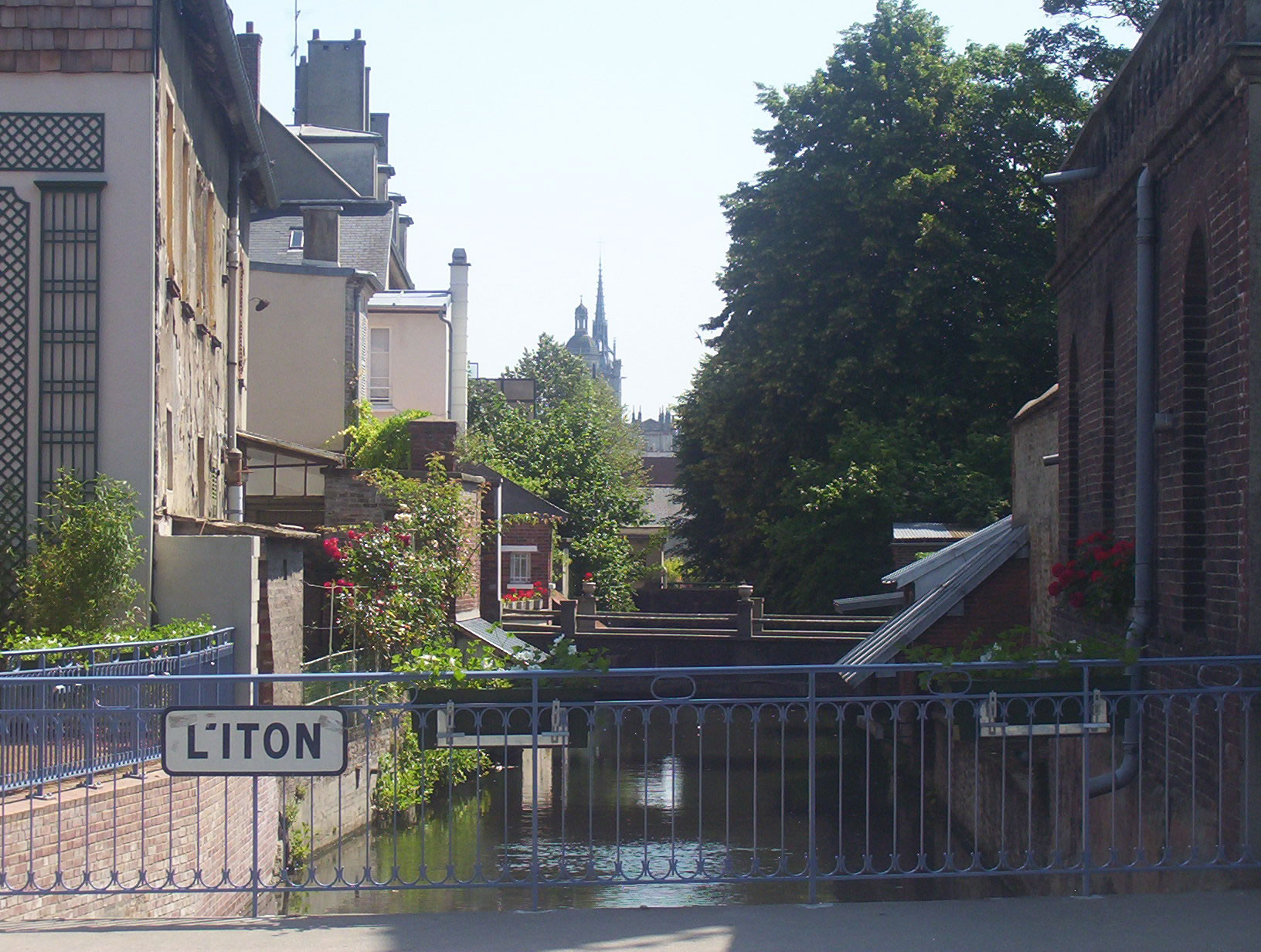
Évreux

Rouen is the regional capital, historically important with many fine churches and buildings, including the tallest cathedral tower in France. The region's largest city, in terms of municipal population, is Le Havre, although Rouen is by far the most populous urban area and metropolitan area. The region is twinned with the London Borough of Redbridge in England. Its economy is centered on agriculture, industry, petrochemicals and tourism.

Bernay
Dieppe
Évreux
Fécamp
Le Grand-Quevilly
Le Havre
Le Petit-Quevilly
Louviers
Mont-Saint-Aignan
Rouen
Saint-Étienne-du-Rouvray
Sotteville-lès-Rouen
Vernon

== See also ==
- Treaty of Louviers
- Museums in Haute-Normandie
