= Épieds, Eure =

Épieds
- Commune
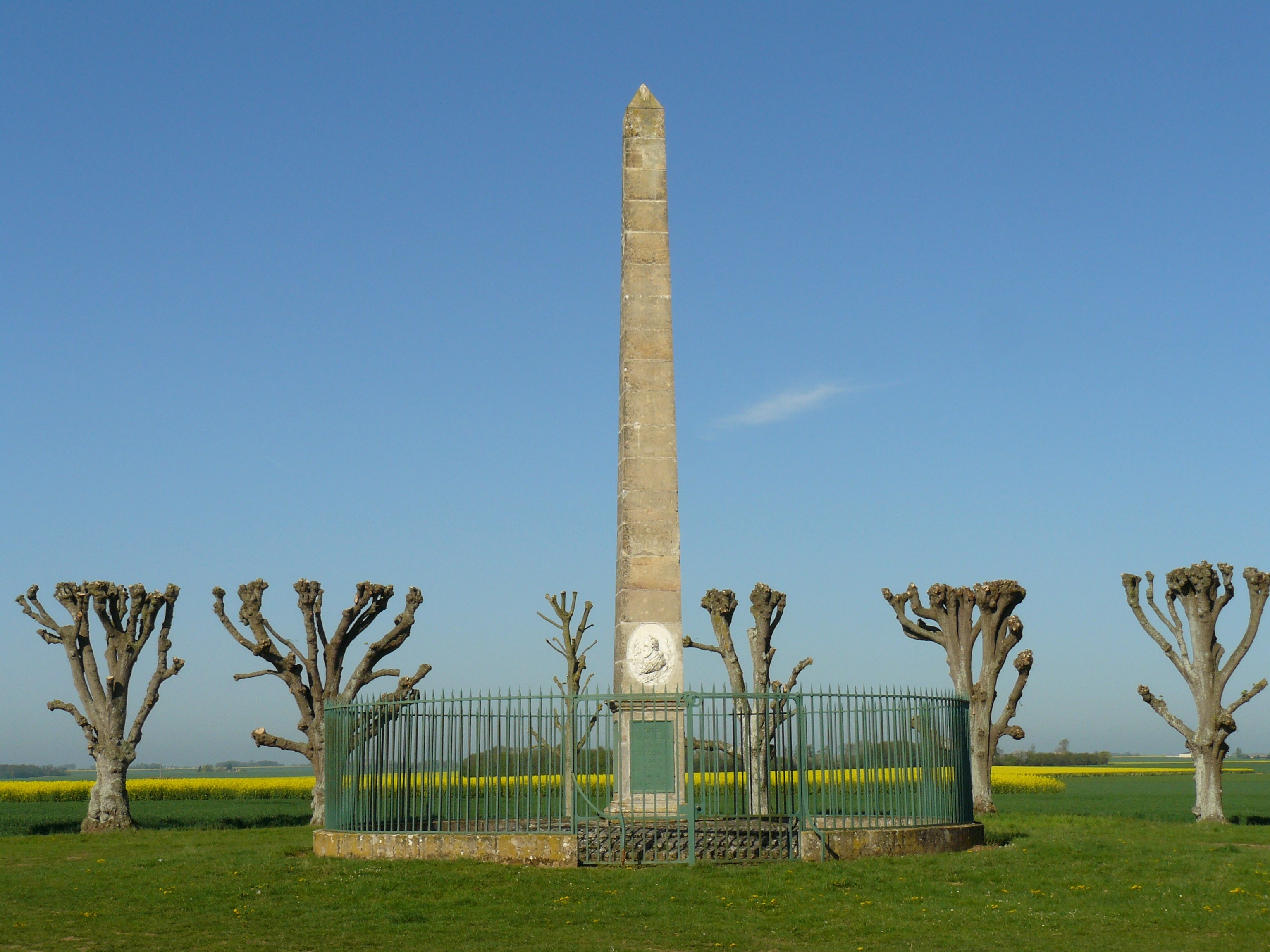
- The Battle of Ivry monument

- Coat of arms
- Location of Épieds
- Location within France Location within Normandy
- Coordinates: 48°56′09″N 1°24′00″E
- Country: France
- Region: Normandy
- Department: Eure
- Arrondissement: Évreux
- Canton: Saint-André-de-l'Eure
- Intercommunality: CA Évreux Portes de Normandie

Government
  - Mayor (2020–2026): Ketty Revel
- Area^{1}: 4.87 km^{2} (1.88 sq mi)
- Elevation: 140 m (460 ft)
- Highest elevation: 140 m (460 ft)
- Lowest elevation: 91 m (299 ft)
- Population (2023): 358
  - Density: 73.5/km^{2} (190/sq mi)
- Time zone: UTC+01:00 (CET)
  - Summer (DST): UTC+02:00 (CEST)
- INSEE/Postal code: 27220 /27730
- ^{1} French Land Register data, which excludes lakes, ponds, glaciers > 1 km^{2} (0.386 sq mi or 247 acres) and river estuaries.

Épieds (French pronunciation: [epje]) is a commune in the Eure department in the Normandy region in northern France.

== Population ==
Historical population
Year	Pop.	±% p.a.
1968	237	—
1975	248	+0.65%
1982	228	−1.19%
1990	230	+0.11%
1999	320	+3.74%
2007	349	+1.09%
2012	378	+1.61%
2017	354	−1.30%
2023	358	+0.19%
Source: INSEE

== See also ==
- Communes of the Eure department
