= Louye =

- Commune
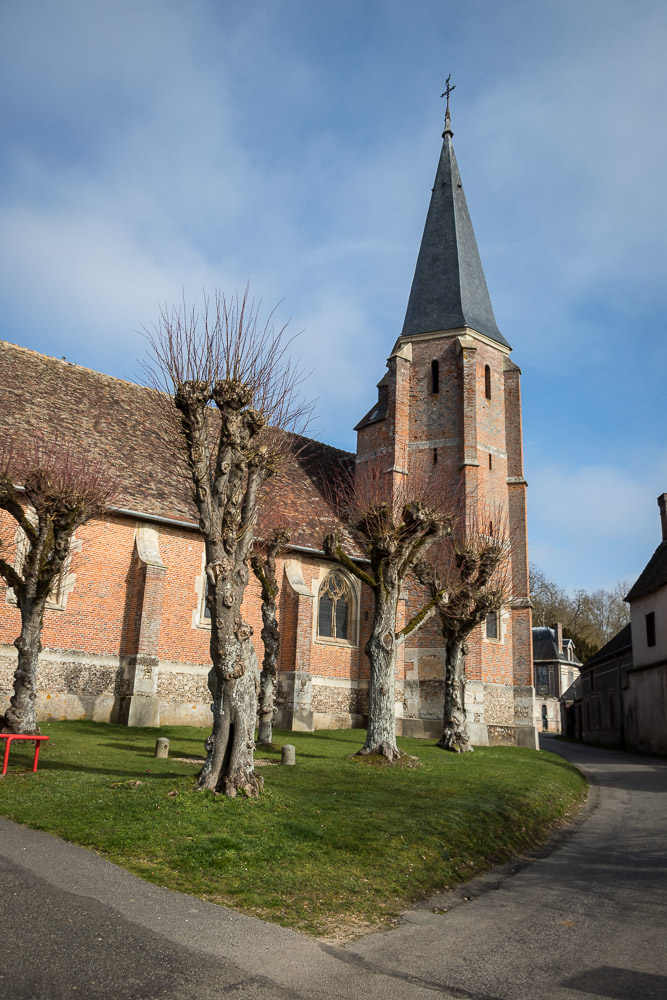
- The church of Saint Nicolas in Louye
- Location of Louye
- Location within France Location within Normandy
- Coordinates: 48°48′N 1°18′E
- Country: France
- Region: Normandy
- Department: Eure
- Arrondissement: Évreux
- Canton: Saint-André-de-l'Eure
- Intercommunality: CA Pays de Dreux

Government
  - Mayor (2020–2026): Thierry Laine
- Area^{1}: 5.2 km^{2} (2.0 sq mi)
- Elevation: 141 m (463 ft)
- Highest elevation: 137 m (449 ft)
- Lowest elevation: 87 m (285 ft)
- Population (2023): 210
  - Density: 40/km^{2} (100/sq mi)
- Time zone: UTC+01:00 (CET)
  - Summer (DST): UTC+02:00 (CEST)
- INSEE/Postal code: 27376 /27650
- ^{1} French Land Register data, which excludes lakes, ponds, glaciers > 1 km^{2} (0.386 sq mi or 247 acres) and river estuaries.

Louye (French pronunciation: [lwi]) is a commune in the Eure department in Normandy in northern France. Louye is situated roughly 76 km from Paris. The Château dates back to 1180.

== Population ==
Historical population
Year	Pop.	±% p.a.
1968	119	—
1975	127	+0.93%
1982	149	+2.31%
1990	175	+2.03%
1999	176	+0.06%
2007	225	+3.12%
2012	245	+1.72%
2017	220	−2.13%
2023	210	−0.77%
Source: INSEE

== See also ==
- Communes of the Eure department
