= Champigny-la-Futelaye =

- Commune
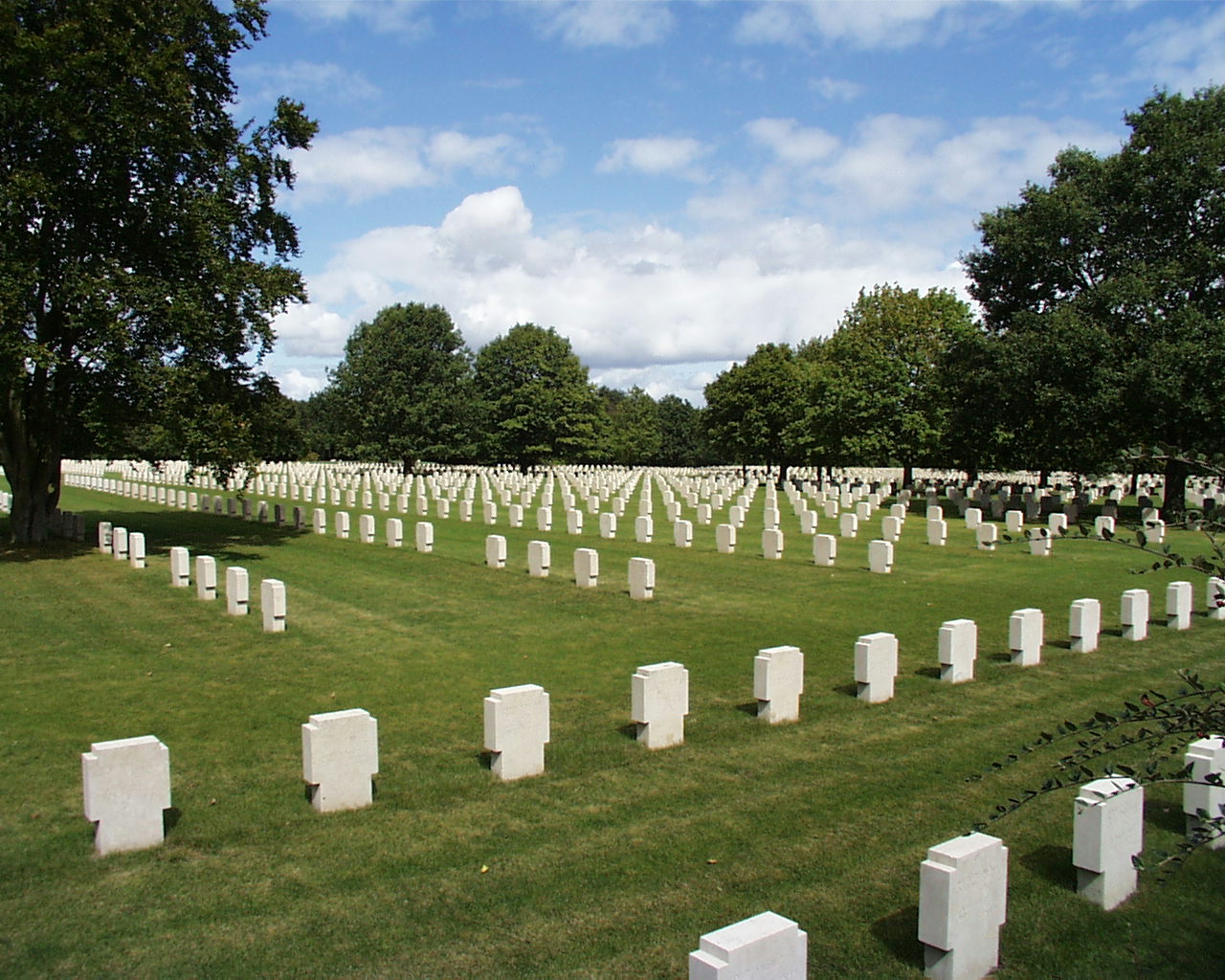
- The German war cemetery in Champigny-la-Futelaye
- Location of Champigny-la-Futelaye
- Location within France Location within Normandy
- Coordinates: 48°51′53″N 1°17′55″E
- Country: France
- Region: Normandy
- Department: Eure
- Arrondissement: Évreux
- Canton: Saint-André-de-l'Eure
- Intercommunality: CA Évreux Portes de Normandie

Government
  - Mayor (2020–2026): Robin Saulnier
- Area^{1}: 15.98 km^{2} (6.17 sq mi)
- Elevation: 192 m (630 ft)
- Highest elevation: 146 m (479 ft)
- Lowest elevation: 94 m (308 ft)
- Population (2023): 271
  - Density: 17.0/km^{2} (43.9/sq mi)
- Time zone: UTC+01:00 (CET)
  - Summer (DST): UTC+02:00 (CEST)
- INSEE/Postal code: 27144 /27220
- ^{1} French Land Register data, which excludes lakes, ponds, glaciers > 1 km^{2} (0.386 sq mi or 247 acres) and river estuaries.

Champigny-la-Futelaye (French pronunciation: [ʃɑ̃piɲi la fytlɛ]) is a commune in the Eure department in northern France.

== Population ==
Historical population
Year	Pop.	±% p.a.
1968	146	—
1975	136	−1.01%
1982	163	+2.62%
1990	207	+3.03%
1999	231	+1.23%
2007	225	−0.33%
2012	253	+2.37%
2017	289	+2.70%
2023	271	−1.07%
Source: INSEE

== See also ==
- Communes of the Eure department
