= Lignerolles, Eure =

Lignerolles
- Commune
- Location of Lignerolles
- Location within France Location within Normandy
- Coordinates: 48°50′51″N 1°16′27″E
- Country: France
- Region: Normandy
- Department: Eure
- Arrondissement: Évreux
- Canton: Saint-André-de-l'Eure
- Intercommunality: Évreux Portes de Normandie

Government
  - Mayor (2020–2026): Didier Schaller
- Area^{1}: 6.22 km^{2} (2.40 sq mi)
- Elevation: 139 m (456 ft)
- Highest elevation: 146 m (479 ft)
- Lowest elevation: 132 m (433 ft)
- Population (2023): 362
  - Density: 58.2/km^{2} (151/sq mi)
- Demonym(s): Lignerollais, Lignerollaises
- Time zone: UTC+01:00 (CET)
  - Summer (DST): UTC+02:00 (CEST)
- INSEE/Postal code: 27368 /27220
- ^{1} French Land Register data, which excludes lakes, ponds, glaciers > 1 km^{2} (0.386 sq mi or 247 acres) and river estuaries.

Lignerolles (French pronunciation: [liɲʁɔl]) is a commune in the Eure department in Normandy in northern France.

== World War II ==
After the liberation of the area by Allied Forces in 1944, engineers of the Ninth Air Force IX Engineering Command began construction of a combat Advanced Landing Ground outside of the town. Declared operational on 18 July, the airfield was designated as "A-12", it was used by several fighter groups which flew P-47 Thunderbolts until late August. Afterward, the airfield was used for resupply and casualty transport. It was closed in early November.

== Population ==
Historical population
Year	Pop.	±% p.a.
1968	195	—
1975	174	−1.61%
1982	184	+0.80%
1990	228	+2.72%
1999	255	+1.25%
2007	285	+1.40%
2012	286	+0.07%
2017	327	+2.72%
2023	362	+1.71%
Source: INSEE

== See also ==
- Communes of the Eure department
