= Coudres =

- Commune
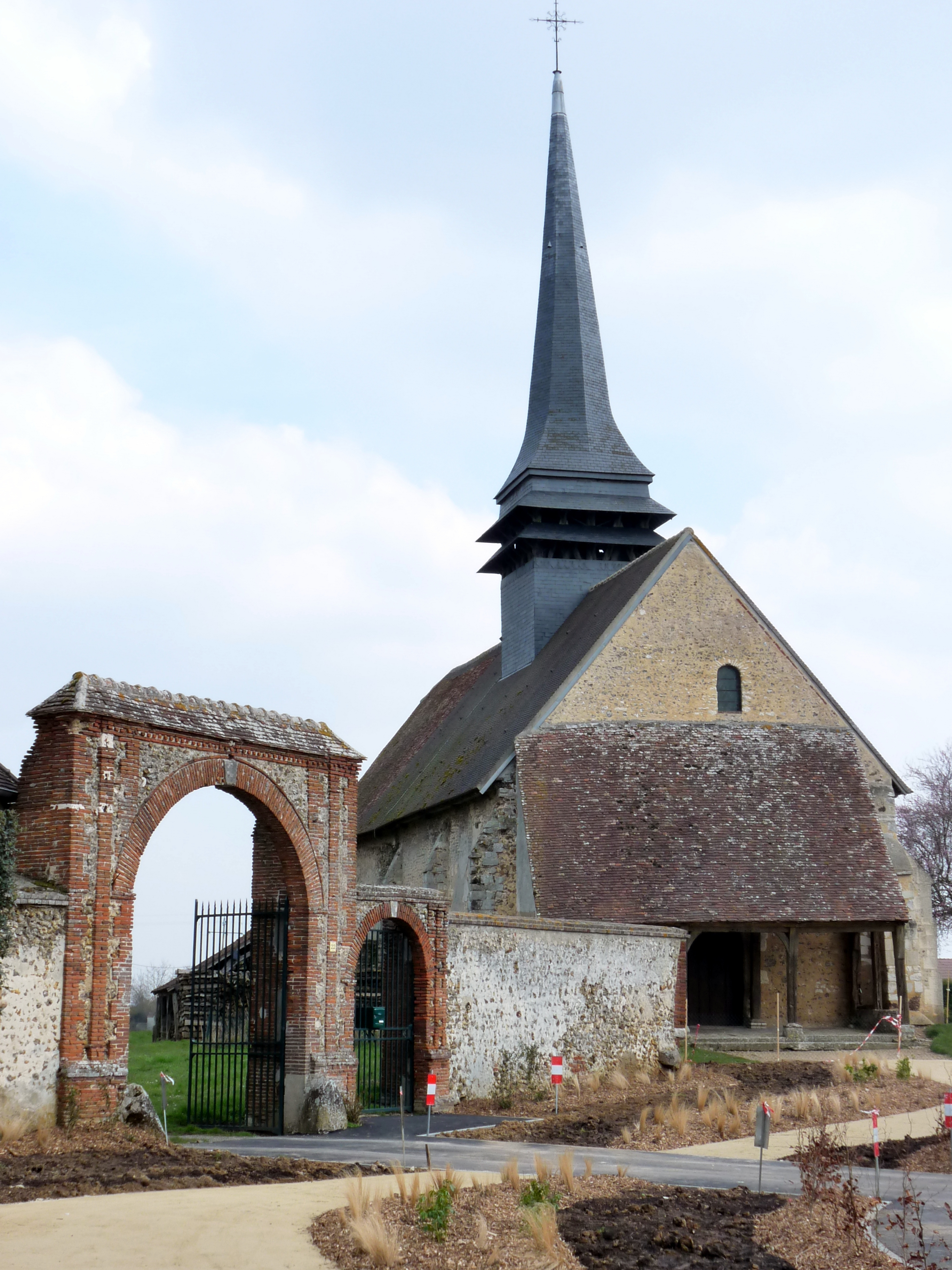
- The church in Coudres

- Coat of arms
- Location of Coudres
- Location within France Location within Normandy
- Coordinates: 48°51′46″N 1°14′42″E
- Country: France
- Region: Normandy
- Department: Eure
- Arrondissement: Évreux
- Canton: Saint-André-de-l'Eure
- Intercommunality: CA Évreux Portes de Normandie

Government
  - Mayor (2020–2026): Isabelle Jaupitre
- Area^{1}: 15.37 km^{2} (5.93 sq mi)
- Elevation: 150 m (490 ft)
- Highest elevation: 150 m (490 ft)
- Lowest elevation: 134 m (440 ft)
- Population (2023): 536
  - Density: 34.9/km^{2} (90.3/sq mi)
- Time zone: UTC+01:00 (CET)
  - Summer (DST): UTC+02:00 (CEST)
- INSEE/Postal code: 27177 /27220
- ^{1} French Land Register data, which excludes lakes, ponds, glaciers > 1 km^{2} (0.386 sq mi or 247 acres) and river estuaries.

Coudres (French pronunciation: [kudʁ]) is a commune in the Eure department in northern France.

== Population ==
Historical population
Year	Pop.	±% p.a.
1968	363	—
1975	330	−1.35%
1982	359	+1.21%
1990	447	+2.78%
1999	454	+0.17%
2007	509	+1.44%
2012	538	+1.11%
2017	552	+0.52%
2023	536	−0.49%
Source: INSEE

== See also ==
- Communes of the Eure department
