= Foucrainville =

- Commune
- Coat of arms
- Location of Foucrainville
- Location within France Location within Normandy
- Coordinates: 48°55′55″N 1°19′27″E
- Country: France
- Region: Normandy
- Department: Eure
- Arrondissement: Évreux
- Canton: Saint-André-de-l'Eure
- Intercommunality: CA Évreux Portes de Normandie

Government
  - Mayor (2020–2026): Geoffrey Cuffaux-Clamamus
- Area^{1}: 5.26 km^{2} (2.03 sq mi)
- Elevation: 143 m (469 ft)
- Highest elevation: 149 m (489 ft)
- Lowest elevation: 139 m (456 ft)
- Population (2023): 89
  - Density: 17/km^{2} (44/sq mi)
- Time zone: UTC+01:00 (CET)
  - Summer (DST): UTC+02:00 (CEST)
- INSEE/Postal code: 27259 /27220
- ^{1} French Land Register data, which excludes lakes, ponds, glaciers > 1 km^{2} (0.386 sq mi or 247 acres) and river estuaries.

Foucrainville (French pronunciation: [fukʁɛ̃vil]) is a commune in the Eure department in the Normandy region in northern France.

== Population ==
Historical population
Year	Pop.	±% p.a.
1968	56	—
1975	51	−1.33%
1982	47	−1.16%
1990	67	+4.53%
1999	67	+0.00%
2007	78	+1.92%
2012	84	+1.49%
2017	78	−1.47%
2023	89	+2.22%
Source: INSEE

== See also ==
- Communes of the Eure department
