= La Forêt-du-Parc =

- Commune
- Location of La Forêt-du-Parc
- Location within France Location within Normandy
- Coordinates: 48°55′25″N 1°14′57″E
- Country: France
- Region: Normandy
- Department: Eure
- Arrondissement: Évreux
- Canton: Saint-André-de-l'Eure
- Intercommunality: CA Évreux Portes de Normandie

Government
  - Mayor (2022–2026): Philippe Dauchez
- Area^{1}: 7.67 km^{2} (2.96 sq mi)
- Elevation: 146 m (479 ft)
- Highest elevation: 152 m (499 ft)
- Lowest elevation: 139 m (456 ft)
- Population (2023): 642
  - Density: 83.7/km^{2} (217/sq mi)
- Time zone: UTC+01:00 (CET)
  - Summer (DST): UTC+02:00 (CEST)
- INSEE/Postal code: 27256 /27220
- ^{1} French Land Register data, which excludes lakes, ponds, glaciers > 1 km^{2} (0.386 sq mi or 247 acres) and river estuaries.

La Forêt-du-Parc (French pronunciation: [la fɔʁɛ dy paʁk]) is a commune in the Eure department in the Normandy region in northern France.

== Population ==
Historical population
Year	Pop.	±% p.a.
1968	147	—
1975	176	+2.61%
1982	270	+6.30%
1990	457	+6.80%
1999	458	+0.02%
2007	510	+1.35%
2012	530	+0.77%
2017	597	+2.41%
2023	642	+1.22%
Source: INSEE

== See also ==
- Communes of the Eure department
