= Mousseaux-Neuville =

- Commune
- Coat of arms
- Location of Mousseaux-Neuville
- Location within France Location within Normandy
- Coordinates: 48°54′32″N 1°20′53″E
- Country: France
- Region: Normandy
- Department: Eure
- Arrondissement: Évreux
- Canton: Saint-André-de-l'Eure
- Intercommunality: CA Évreux Portes de Normandie

Government
  - Mayor (2021–2026): Cédric Levert
- Area^{1}: 14.2 km^{2} (5.5 sq mi)
- Elevation: 139 m (456 ft)
- Highest elevation: 147 m (482 ft)
- Lowest elevation: 93 m (305 ft)
- Population (2023): 636
  - Density: 44.8/km^{2} (116/sq mi)
- Time zone: UTC+01:00 (CET)
  - Summer (DST): UTC+02:00 (CEST)
- INSEE/Postal code: 27421 /27220
- ^{1} French Land Register data, which excludes lakes, ponds, glaciers > 1 km^{2} (0.386 sq mi or 247 acres) and river estuaries.

Mousseaux-Neuville (French pronunciation: [muso nøvil]) is a commune in the Eure department in Normandy in northern France.

== Population ==
Historical population
Year	Pop.	±% p.a.
1968	286	—
1975	243	−2.30%
1982	320	+4.01%
1990	437	+3.97%
1999	560	+2.79%
2007	673	+2.32%
2012	663	−0.30%
2017	647	−0.49%
2023	636	−0.29%
Source: INSEE

== See also ==
- Communes of the Eure department
