= Évreux Portes de Normandie =

Coordinates: 49.02°N 1.15°E

- Communauté d'agglomération
- Country: France
- Region: Normandy
- Department: Eure
- No. of communes: {{{nbcomm}}}
- Established: 2017
- Area: 659.3 km^{2} (254.6 sq mi)
- Population (2018): 110,023
  - Density: 166.9/km^{2} (432.2/sq mi)

Évreux Portes de Normandie is the communauté d'agglomération, an intercommunal structure, centred on the city of Évreux. It is located in the Eure department, in the Normandy region, northern France. It was created on 1 January 2017 by the merger of the former Communauté d'agglomération d'Évreux and the Communauté de communes La porte normande. On 1 January 2018 it was expanded with 12 communes from three other intercommunalities. Its area is 659.3 km^{2}. Its population was 110,023 in 2015, of which 46,707 in Évreux proper.

== Composition ==
The communauté d'agglomération consists of the following 74 communes:

1. Acon
2. Angerville-la-Campagne
3. Arnières-sur-Iton
4. Les Authieux
5. Aviron
6. La Baronnie
7. Les Baux-Sainte-Croix
8. Bois-le-Roi
9. Boncourt
10. Le Boulay-Morin
11. Bretagnolles
12. Caugé
13. Champigny-la-Futelaye
14. La Chapelle-du-Bois-des-Faulx
15. Chavigny-Bailleul
16. Cierrey
17. Coudres
18. Courdemanche
19. La Couture-Boussey
20. Croth
21. Dardez
22. Droisy
23. Émalleville
24. Épieds
25. Évreux
26. Fauville
27. Fontaine-sous-Jouy
28. La Forêt-du-Parc
29. Foucrainville
30. Fresney
31. Garennes-sur-Eure
32. Gauciel
33. Gauville-la-Campagne
34. Gravigny
35. Grossœuvre
36. Guichainville
37. L'Habit
38. Huest
39. Illiers-l'Évêque
40. Irreville
41. Jouy-sur-Eure
42. Jumelles
43. Lignerolles
44. Marcilly-la-Campagne
45. Marcilly-sur-Eure
46. Le Mesnil-Fuguet
47. Mesnil-sur-l'Estrée
48. Miserey
49. Moisville
50. Mouettes
51. Mousseaux-Neuville
52. Muzy
53. Normanville
54. Parville
55. Le Plessis-Grohan
56. Prey
57. Reuilly
58. Sacquenville
59. Saint-André-de-l'Eure
60. Saint-Germain-de-Fresney
61. Saint-Germain-des-Angles
62. Saint-Germain-sur-Avre
63. Saint-Laurent-des-Bois
64. Saint-Luc
65. Saint-Martin-la-Campagne
66. Saint-Sébastien-de-Morsent
67. Saint-Vigor
68. Sassey
69. Serez
70. Tourneville
71. La Trinité
72. Le Val-David
73. Les Ventes
74. Le Vieil-Évreux

== See also ==
- Agglomeration communities in France
