= L'Habit =

- Commune
- Coat of arms
- Location of L'Habit
- Location within France Location within Normandy
- Coordinates: 48°52′29″N 1°21′48″E
- Country: France
- Region: Normandy
- Department: Eure
- Arrondissement: Évreux
- Canton: Saint-André-de-l'Eure
- Intercommunality: CA Évreux Portes de Normandie

Government
  - Mayor (2020–2026): Jean-Pierre Pichois
- Area^{1}: 5.08 km^{2} (1.96 sq mi)
- Elevation: 120 m (390 ft)
- Highest elevation: 135 m (443 ft)
- Lowest elevation: 75 m (246 ft)
- Population (2023): 476
  - Density: 93.7/km^{2} (243/sq mi)
- Time zone: UTC+01:00 (CET)
  - Summer (DST): UTC+02:00 (CEST)
- INSEE/Postal code: 27309 /27220
- ^{1} French Land Register data, which excludes lakes, ponds, glaciers > 1 km^{2} (0.386 sq mi or 247 acres) and river estuaries.

L'Habit (French pronunciation: [labi]) is a commune in the Eure department in northern France.

== Population ==
Historical population
Year	Pop.	±% p.a.
1968	144	—
1975	203	+5.03%
1982	295	+5.48%
1990	364	+2.66%
1999	404	+1.17%
2007	494	+2.55%
2012	521	+1.07%
2017	506	−0.58%
2023	476	−1.01%
Source: INSEE

== Economy ==
They are most well known for the blankets they make out of ox leather.

== See also ==
- Communes of the Eure department
