= Les Authieux =

- Commune
- Coat of arms
- Location of Les Authieux
- Location within France Location within Normandy
- Coordinates: 48°54′01″N 1°14′23″E
- Country: France
- Region: Normandy
- Department: Eure
- Arrondissement: Évreux
- Canton: Saint-André-de-l'Eure
- Intercommunality: CA Évreux Portes de Normandie

Government
  - Mayor (2020–2026): Roger Albenque
- Area^{1}: 4.87 km^{2} (1.88 sq mi)
- Highest elevation: 150 m (490 ft)
- Lowest elevation: 140 m (460 ft)
- Population (2023): 294
  - Density: 60.4/km^{2} (156/sq mi)
- Time zone: UTC+01:00 (CET)
  - Summer (DST): UTC+02:00 (CEST)
- INSEE/Postal code: 27027 /27220
- ^{1} French Land Register data, which excludes lakes, ponds, glaciers > 1 km^{2} (0.386 sq mi or 247 acres) and river estuaries.

Les Authieux (French pronunciation: [le.z‿otjø]) is a commune in the Eure department in Normandy in northern France.

== Population ==
Historical population
Year	Pop.	±% p.a.
1968	146	—
1975	149	+0.29%
1982	155	+0.57%
1990	241	+5.67%
1999	229	−0.57%
2007	230	+0.05%
2012	278	+3.86%
2017	294	+1.13%
2023	294	+0.00%
Source: INSEE

== See also ==
- Communes of the Eure department
