= Garennes-sur-Eure =

- Commune
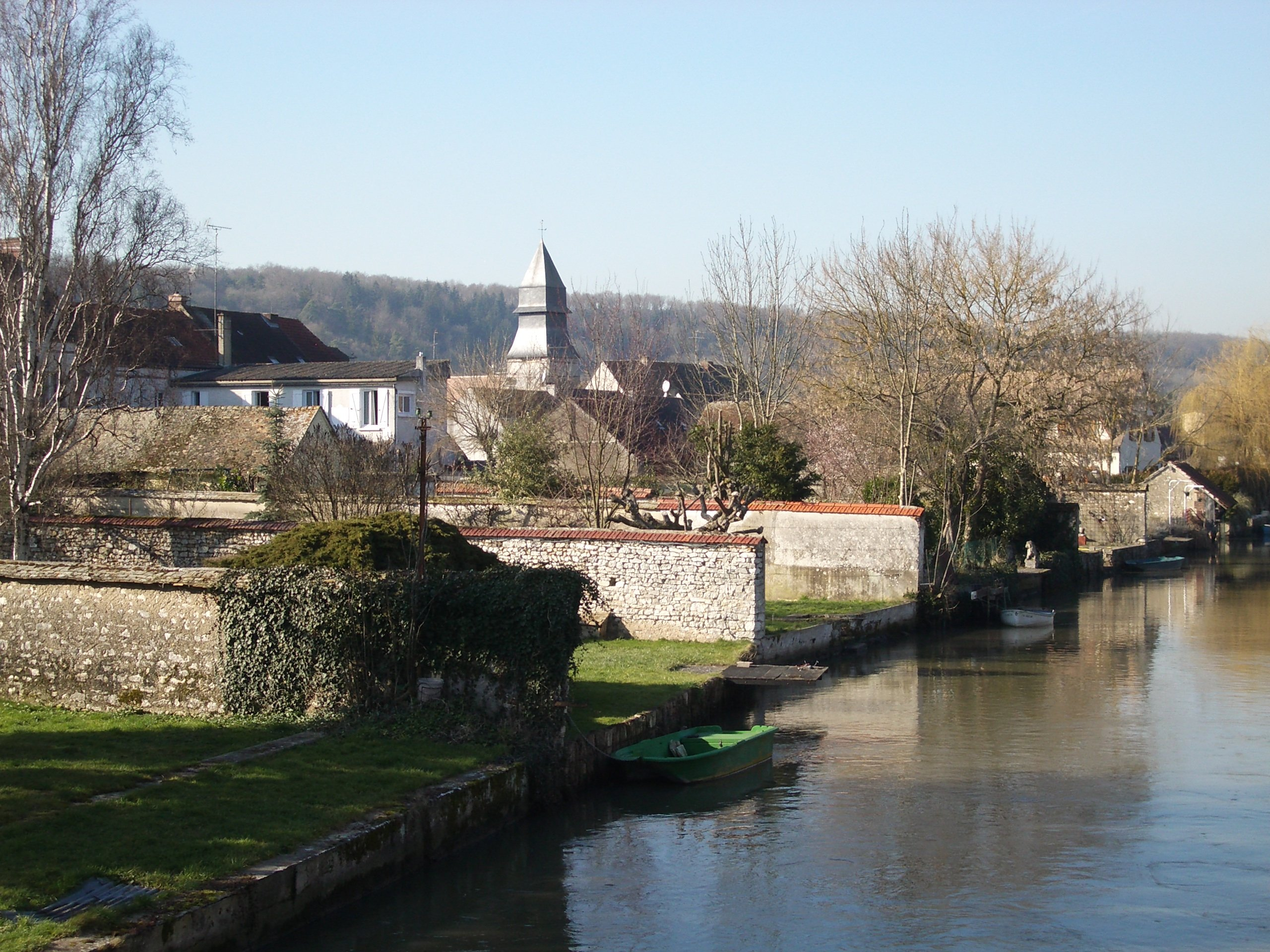
- The commune seen from the bridge

- Coat of arms
- Location of Garennes-sur-Eure
- Location within France Location within Normandy
- Coordinates: 48°54′42″N 1°26′25″E
- Country: France
- Region: Normandy
- Department: Eure
- Arrondissement: Évreux
- Canton: Saint-André-de-l'Eure
- Intercommunality: CA Évreux Portes de Normandie

Government
  - Mayor (2020–2026): Jean-Pierre Gatine
- Area^{1}: 10.52 km^{2} (4.06 sq mi)
- Elevation: 50 m (160 ft)
- Highest elevation: 137 m (449 ft)
- Lowest elevation: 51 m (167 ft)
- Population (2023): 1,996
  - Density: 189.7/km^{2} (491.4/sq mi)
- Time zone: UTC+01:00 (CET)
  - Summer (DST): UTC+02:00 (CEST)
- INSEE/Postal code: 27278 /27780
- ^{1} French Land Register data, which excludes lakes, ponds, glaciers > 1 km^{2} (0.386 sq mi or 247 acres) and river estuaries.

Garennes-sur-Eure (French pronunciation: [ɡaʁɛn syʁ œʁ], literally Garennes on Eure) is a commune in the Eure department in northern France. The 19th-century French painter Alfred-Henri Bramtot (1852–1894) died in Garennes-sur-Eure.

== Population ==
Historical population
Year	Pop.	±% p.a.
1968	783	—
1975	881	+1.70%
1982	1,154	+3.93%
1990	1,365	+2.12%
1999	1,572	+1.58%
2007	1,792	+1.65%
2012	1,842	+0.55%
2017	1,908	+0.71%
2023	1,996	+0.75%
Source: INSEE

== See also ==
- Communes of the Eure department
