= Saint-Laurent-des-Bois, Eure =

Saint-Laurent-des-Bois
- Commune
- Coat of arms
- Location of Saint-Laurent-des-Bois
- Location within France Location within Normandy
- Coordinates: 48°50′46″N 1°19′07″E
- Country: France
- Region: Normandy
- Department: Eure
- Arrondissement: Évreux
- Canton: Saint-André-de-l'Eure
- Intercommunality: CA Évreux Portes de Normandie

Government
  - Mayor (2020–2026): Colette Blanchard
- Area^{1}: 3.33 km^{2} (1.29 sq mi)
- Elevation: 145 m (476 ft)
- Highest elevation: 140 m (460 ft)
- Lowest elevation: 120 m (390 ft)
- Population (2023): 243
  - Density: 73.0/km^{2} (189/sq mi)
- Time zone: UTC+01:00 (CET)
  - Summer (DST): UTC+02:00 (CEST)
- INSEE/Postal code: 27555 /27220
- ^{1} French Land Register data, which excludes lakes, ponds, glaciers > 1 km^{2} (0.386 sq mi or 247 acres) and river estuaries.

Saint-Laurent-des-Bois (French pronunciation: [sɛ̃ loʁɑ̃ de bwa]) is a commune in the Eure department in Normandy in northern France.

== Population ==
Historical population
Year	Pop.	±% p.a.
1968	58	—
1975	73	+3.34%
1982	102	+4.89%
1990	184	+7.65%
1999	171	−0.81%
2007	206	+2.35%
2012	245	+3.53%
2017	248	+0.24%
2023	243	−0.34%
Source: INSEE

== See also ==
- Communes of the Eure department
