= Grossœuvre =

- Commune
- Coat of arms
- Location of Grossœuvre
- Location within France Location within Normandy
- Coordinates: 48°56′19″N 1°11′58″E
- Country: France
- Region: Normandy
- Department: Eure
- Arrondissement: Évreux
- Canton: Saint-André-de-l'Eure
- Intercommunality: CA Évreux Portes de Normandie

Government
  - Mayor (2020–2026): Gabrielle Brochand Dulac
- Area^{1}: 16.36 km^{2} (6.32 sq mi)
- Elevation: 144 m (472 ft)
- Highest elevation: 156 m (512 ft)
- Lowest elevation: 134 m (440 ft)
- Population (2023): 1,455
  - Density: 88.94/km^{2} (230.3/sq mi)
- Time zone: UTC+01:00 (CET)
  - Summer (DST): UTC+02:00 (CEST)
- INSEE/Postal code: 27301 /27220
- ^{1} French Land Register data, which excludes lakes, ponds, glaciers > 1 km^{2} (0.386 sq mi or 247 acres) and river estuaries.

Grossœuvre (French pronunciation: [ɡʁosœvʁ]) is a commune in the Eure department in northern France.

== Population ==
Historical population
Year	Pop.	±% p.a.
1968	344	—
1975	572	+7.53%
1982	856	+5.93%
1990	980	+1.71%
1999	988	+0.09%
2007	1,037	+0.61%
2012	1,062	+0.48%
2017	1,227	+2.93%
2023	1,455	+2.88%
Source: INSEE

== See also ==
- Communes of the Eure department
