= Bretagnolles =

- Commune
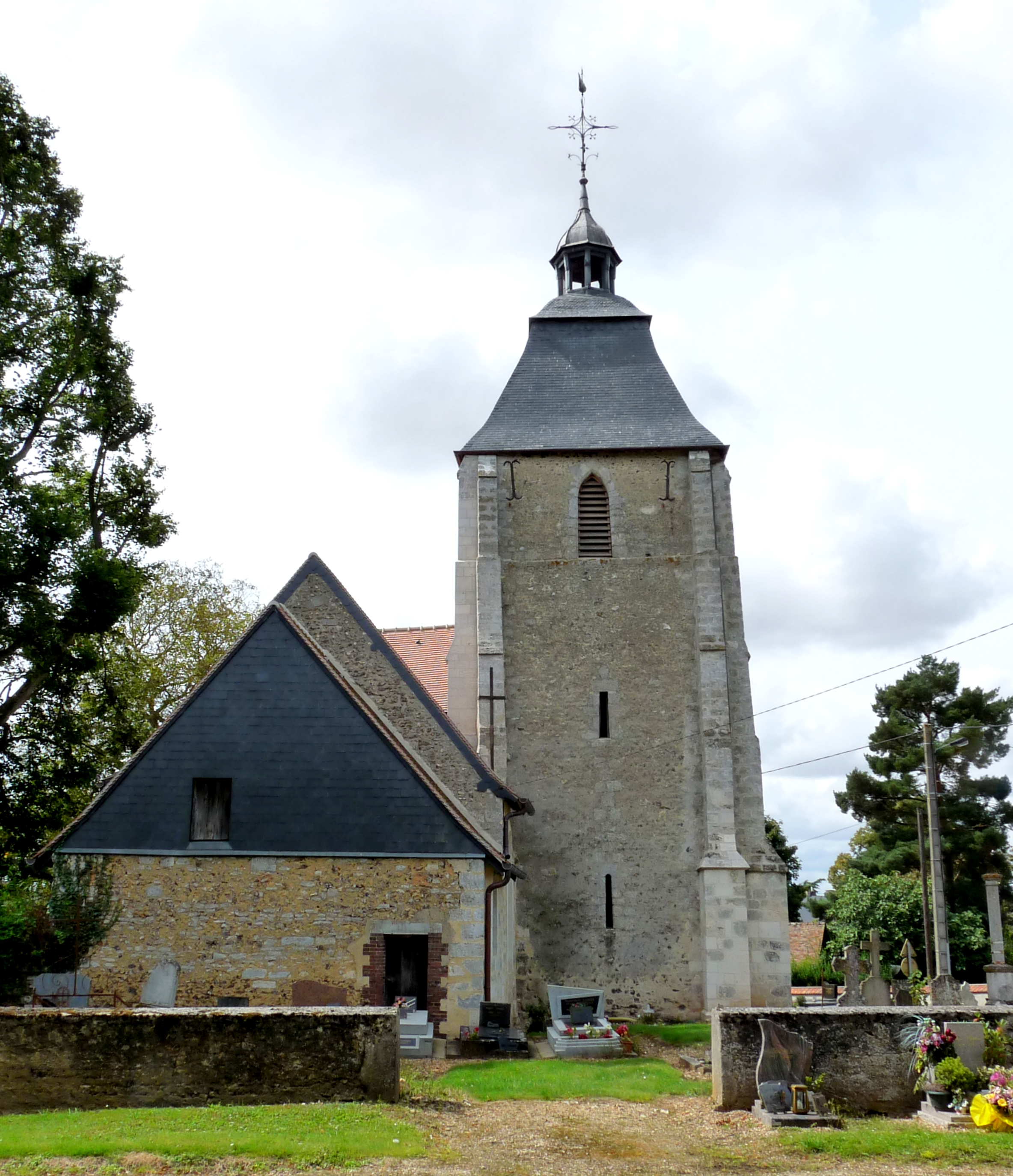
- The church in Bretagnolles
- Location of Bretagnolles
- Location within France Location within Normandy
- Coordinates: 48°57′09″N 1°21′13″E
- Country: France
- Region: Normandy
- Department: Eure
- Arrondissement: Évreux
- Canton: Saint-André-de-l'Eure
- Intercommunality: CA Évreux Portes de Normandie

Government
  - Mayor (2020–2026): Christine Lemonne
- Area^{1}: 3.78 km^{2} (1.46 sq mi)
- Elevation: 140 m (460 ft)
- Highest elevation: 146 m (479 ft)
- Lowest elevation: 119 m (390 ft)
- Population (2023): 203
  - Density: 53.7/km^{2} (139/sq mi)
- Time zone: UTC+01:00 (CET)
  - Summer (DST): UTC+02:00 (CEST)
- INSEE/Postal code: 27111 /27220
- ^{1} French Land Register data, which excludes lakes, ponds, glaciers > 1 km^{2} (0.386 sq mi or 247 acres) and river estuaries.

Bretagnolles is a commune in the Eure department in Normandy in northern France.

== Population ==
Historical population
Year	Pop.	±% p.a.
1968	102	—
1975	92	−1.46%
1982	92	+0.00%
1990	157	+6.91%
1999	185	+1.84%
2007	182	−0.20%
2012	193	+1.18%
2017	201	+0.82%
2023	203	+0.17%
Source: INSEE

== See also ==
- Communes of the Eure department
