= Muzy =

- Commune
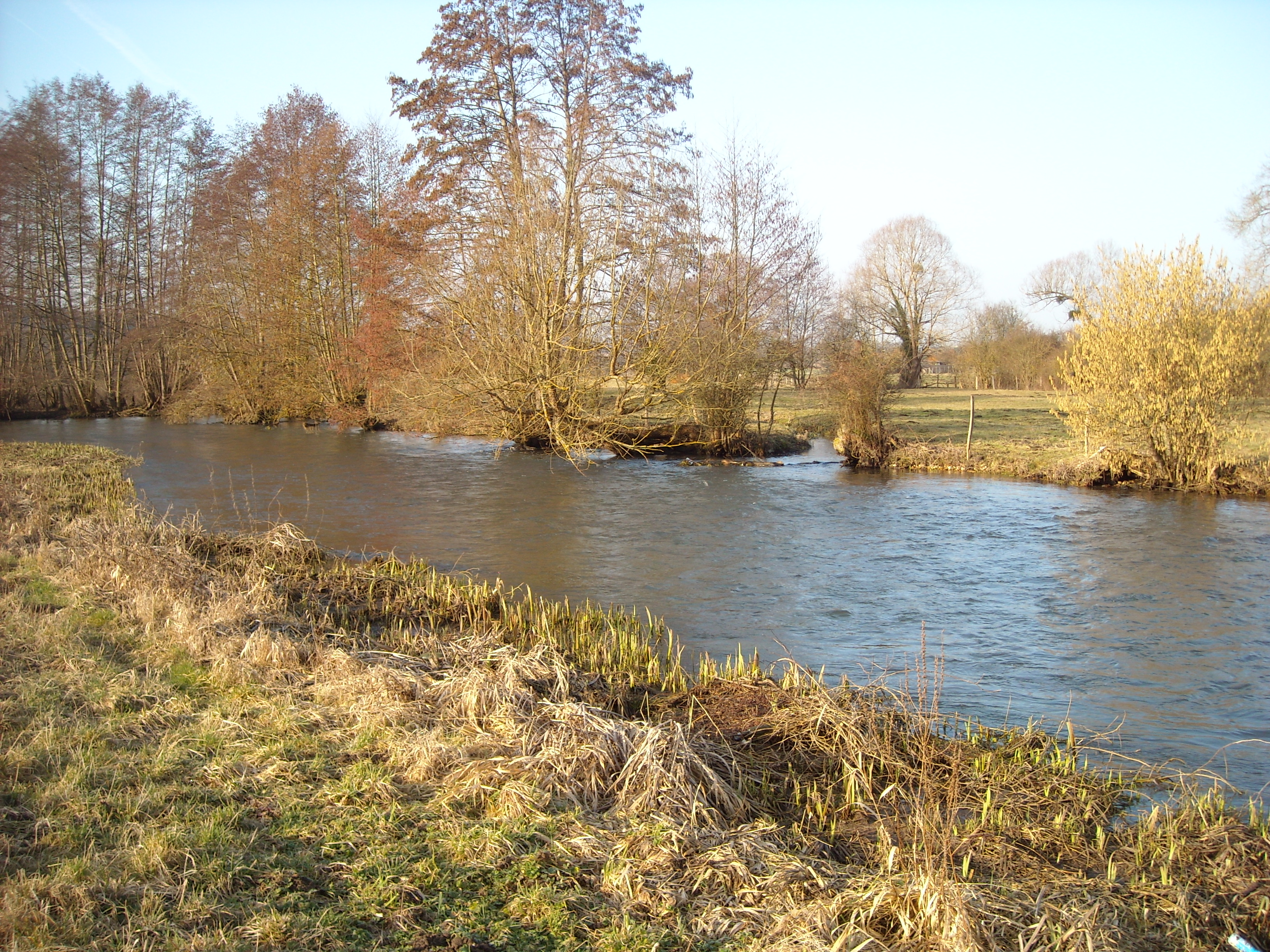
- The Avre river in Muzy

- Coat of arms
- Location of Muzy
- Location within France Location within Normandy
- Coordinates: 48°46′34″N 1°20′47″E
- Country: France
- Region: Normandy
- Department: Eure
- Arrondissement: Évreux
- Canton: Saint-André-de-l'Eure
- Intercommunality: Évreux Portes de Normandie

Government
  - Mayor (2020–2026): Emmanuelle Tremel
- Area^{1}: 9.18 km^{2} (3.54 sq mi)
- Elevation: 79 m (259 ft)
- Highest elevation: 137 m (449 ft)
- Lowest elevation: 76 m (249 ft)
- Population (2023): 768
  - Density: 83.7/km^{2} (217/sq mi)
- Time zone: UTC+01:00 (CET)
  - Summer (DST): UTC+02:00 (CEST)
- INSEE/Postal code: 27423 /27650
- ^{1} French Land Register data, which excludes lakes, ponds, glaciers > 1 km^{2} (0.386 sq mi or 247 acres) and river estuaries.

Muzy (French pronunciation: [myzi]) is a commune in the Eure department in Normandy in northern France.

== Population ==
Historical population
Year	Pop.	±% p.a.
1968	373	—
1975	437	+2.29%
1982	510	+2.23%
1990	632	+2.72%
1999	694	+1.05%
2007	818	+2.08%
2012	809	−0.22%
2017	805	−0.10%
2023	768	−0.78%
Source: INSEE

== See also ==
- Communes of the Eure department
