= Marcilly-sur-Eure =

- Commune
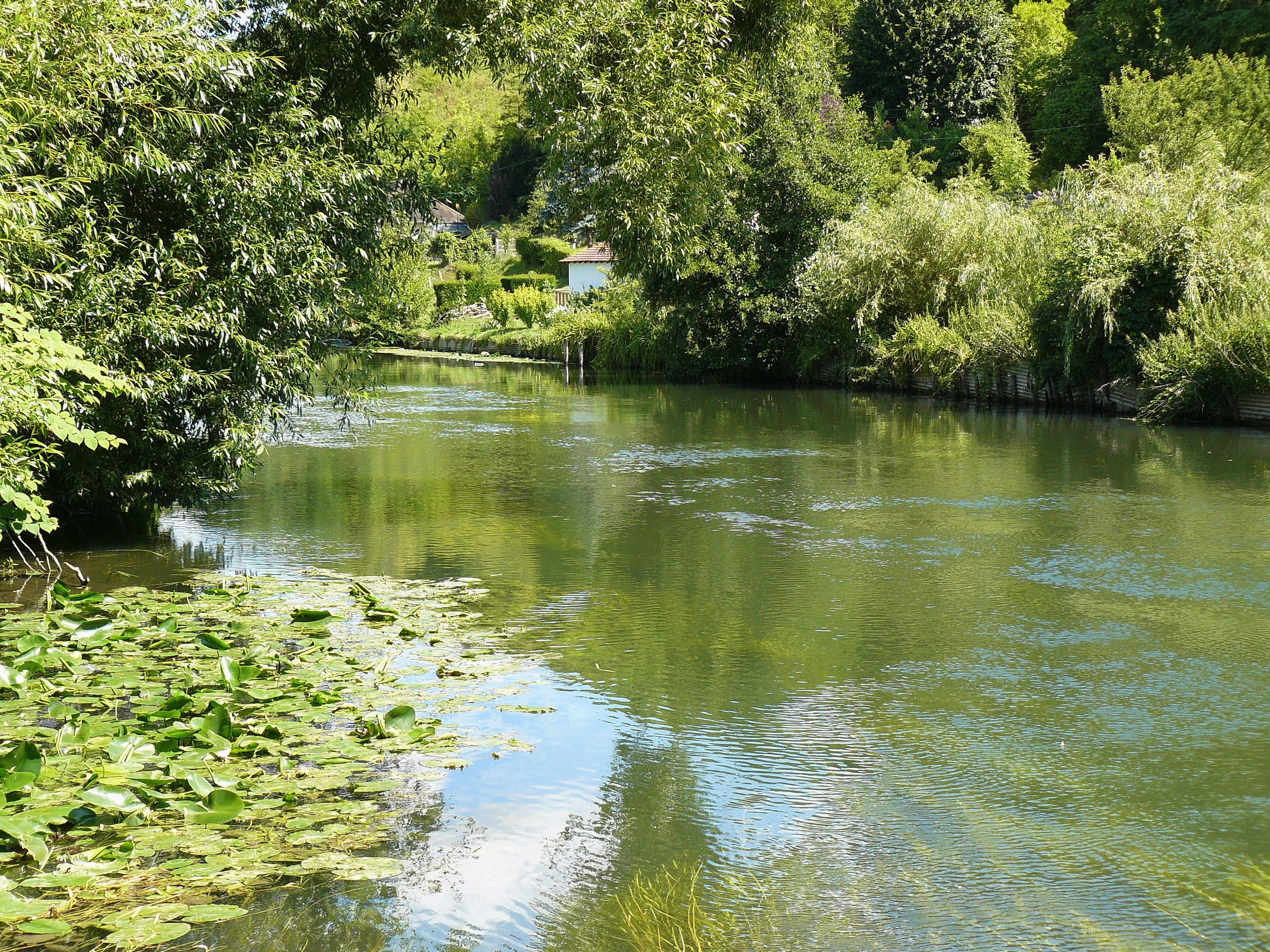
- The Eure river in Marcilly-sur-Eure

- Coat of arms
- Location of Marcilly-sur-Eure
- Location within France Location within Normandy
- Coordinates: 48°49′38″N 1°20′51″E
- Country: France
- Region: Normandy
- Department: Eure
- Arrondissement: Évreux
- Canton: Saint-André-de-l'Eure
- Intercommunality: CA Évreux Portes de Normandie

Government
  - Mayor (2020–2026): Claude Royoux
- Area^{1}: 15.48 km^{2} (5.98 sq mi)
- Elevation: 72 m (236 ft)
- Highest elevation: 141 m (463 ft)
- Lowest elevation: 65 m (213 ft)
- Population (2023): 1,607
  - Density: 103.8/km^{2} (268.9/sq mi)
- Time zone: UTC+01:00 (CET)
  - Summer (DST): UTC+02:00 (CEST)
- INSEE/Postal code: 27391 /27810
- ^{1} French Land Register data, which excludes lakes, ponds, glaciers > 1 km^{2} (0.386 sq mi or 247 acres) and river estuaries.

Marcilly-sur-Eure (French pronunciation: [maʁsiji syʁ œʁ], literally Marcilly on Eure) is a commune in the Eure department in Normandy in north-western France.

== Population ==
Historical population
Year	Pop.	±% p.a.
1968	565	—
1975	688	+2.85%
1982	692	+0.08%
1990	1,244	+7.61%
1999	1,229	−0.13%
2007	1,449	+2.08%
2012	1,575	+1.68%
2017	1,580	+0.06%
2023	1,607	+0.28%
Source: INSEE

== See also ==
- Communes of the Eure department
