= Chavigny-Bailleul =

- Commune
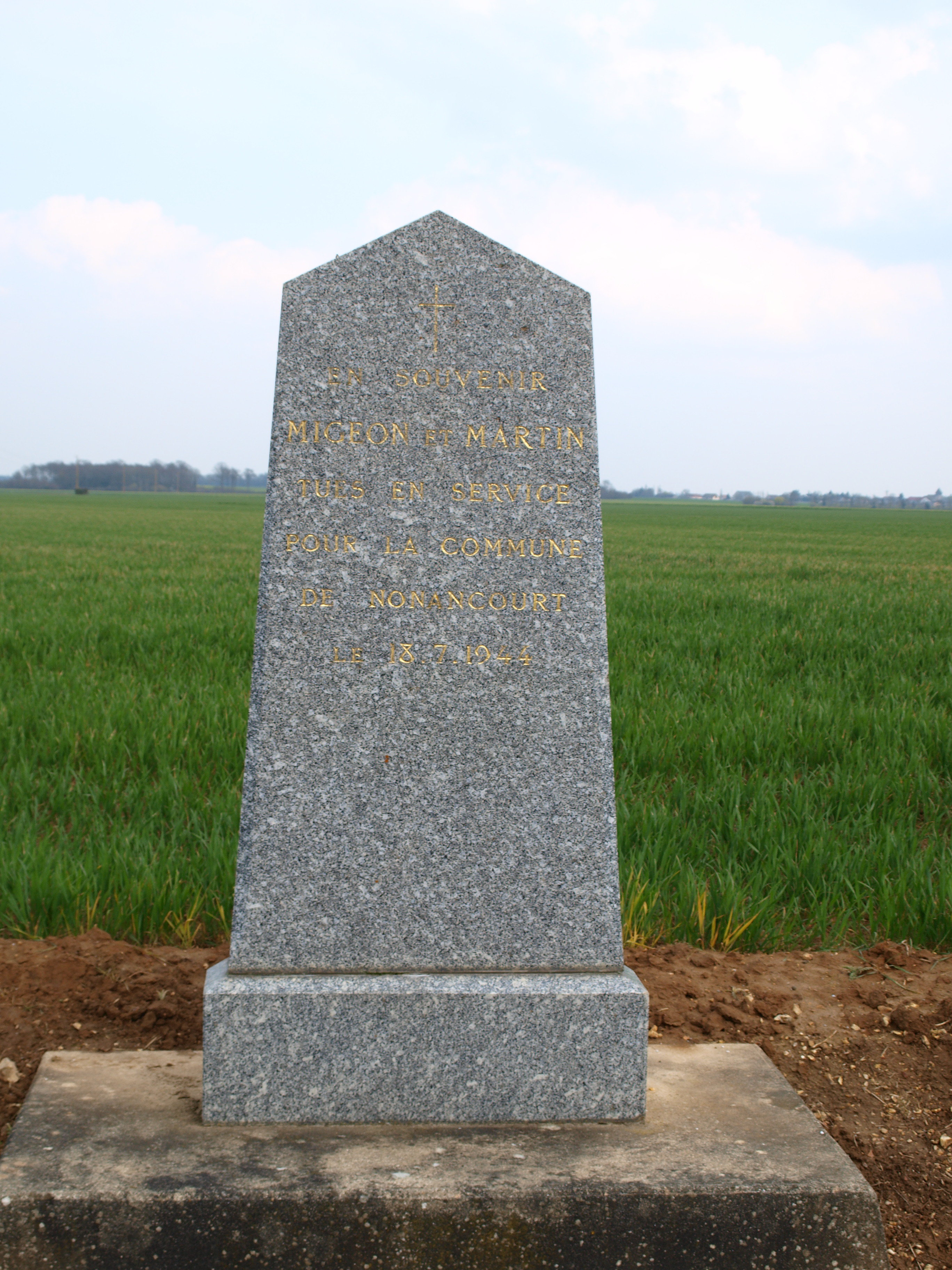
- A monument in Chavigny-Bailleul

- Coat of arms
- Location of Chavigny-Bailleul
- Location within France Location within Normandy
- Coordinates: 48°52′37″N 1°12′13″E
- Country: France
- Region: Normandy
- Department: Eure
- Arrondissement: Évreux
- Canton: Saint-André-de-l'Eure
- Intercommunality: CA Évreux Portes de Normandie

Government
  - Mayor (2020–2026): Gérard Asmonti
- Area^{1}: 18.42 km^{2} (7.11 sq mi)
- Elevation: 150 m (490 ft)
- Highest elevation: 154 m (505 ft)
- Lowest elevation: 142 m (466 ft)
- Population (2023): 566
  - Density: 30.7/km^{2} (79.6/sq mi)
- Time zone: UTC+01:00 (CET)
  - Summer (DST): UTC+02:00 (CEST)
- INSEE/Postal code: 27154 /27220
- ^{1} French Land Register data, which excludes lakes, ponds, glaciers > 1 km^{2} (0.386 sq mi or 247 acres) and river estuaries.

Chavigny-Bailleul (French pronunciation: [ʃaviɲi bajœl]) is a commune in the Eure department in northern France.

== Population ==
Historical population
Year	Pop.	±% p.a.
1968	311	—
1975	268	−2.10%
1982	356	+4.14%
1990	466	+3.42%
1999	462	−0.10%
2007	497	+0.92%
2012	569	+2.74%
2017	593	+0.83%
2023	566	−0.77%
Source: INSEE

== See also ==
- Communes of the Eure department
