= Mesnil-sur-l'Estrée =

- Commune
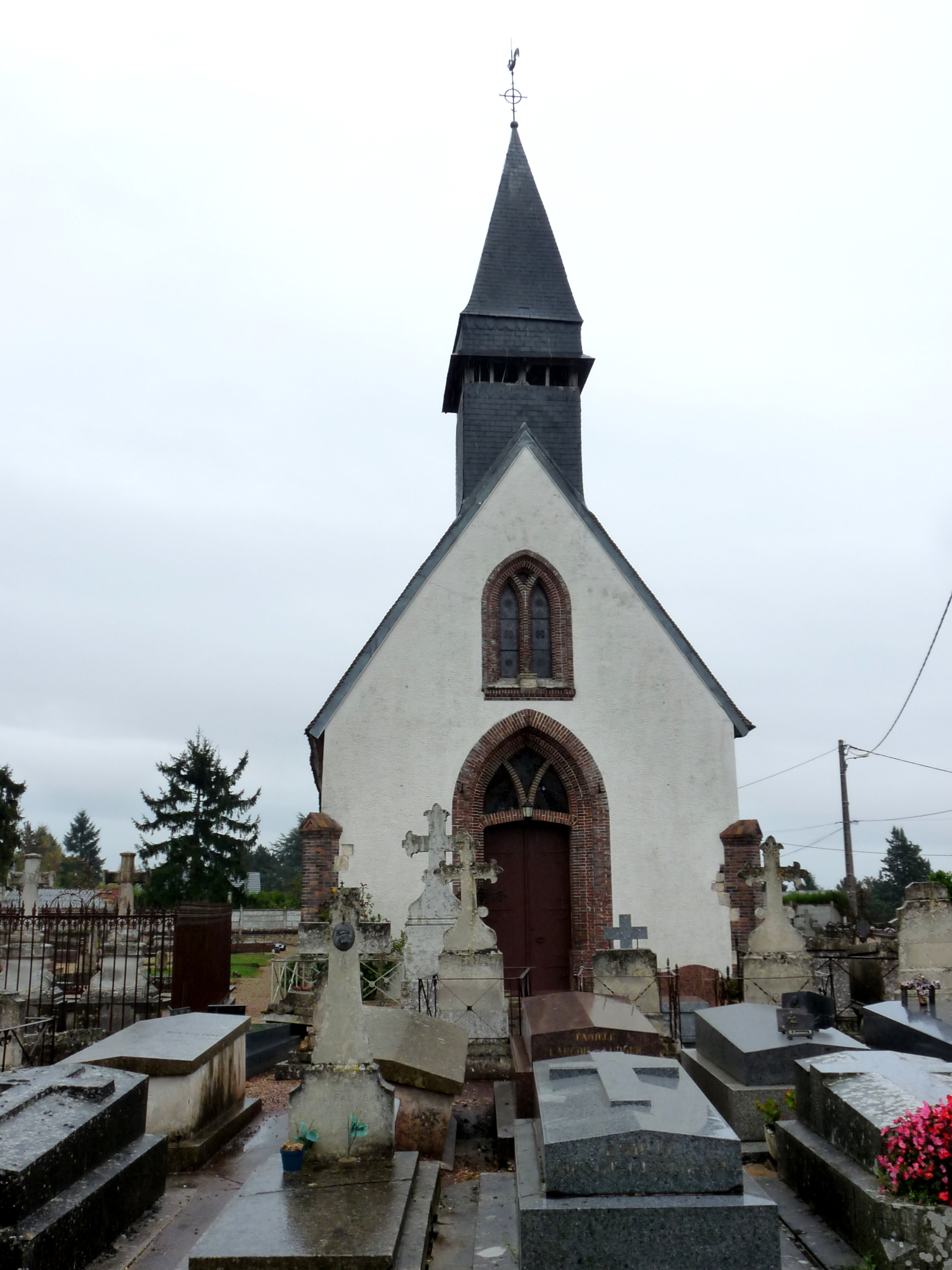
- The church in Mesnil-sur-l'Estrée
- Location of Mesnil-sur-l'Estrée
- Location within France Location within Normandy
- Coordinates: 48°46′22″N 1°18′08″E
- Country: France
- Region: Normandy
- Department: Eure
- Arrondissement: Évreux
- Canton: Saint-André-de-l'Eure
- Intercommunality: Évreux Portes de Normandie

Government
  - Mayor (2020–2026): Fabrice Bossuyt
- Area^{1}: 5.76 km^{2} (2.22 sq mi)
- Elevation: 132 m (433 ft)
- Highest elevation: 139 m (456 ft)
- Lowest elevation: 83 m (272 ft)
- Population (2023): 942
  - Density: 164/km^{2} (424/sq mi)
- Time zone: UTC+01:00 (CET)
  - Summer (DST): UTC+02:00 (CEST)
- INSEE/Postal code: 27406 /27650
- ^{1} French Land Register data, which excludes lakes, ponds, glaciers > 1 km^{2} (0.386 sq mi or 247 acres) and river estuaries.

Mesnil-sur-l'Estrée (French pronunciation: [mɛnil syʁ lɛstʁe]) is a commune in the Eure department in Normandy in northern France.

It is one of many villages in the north of France bearing the name Estrées. The etymology of the name is from strata (cognate of English "street") which developed into "estrée" - the word for the stone-layered Roman roads in the area (some of which turned into modern highways). Hence "Mesnil-sur-l'Estrée", "Mesnil On The Road".

== Population ==
Historical population
Year	Pop.	±% p.a.
1968	753	—
1975	739	−0.27%
1982	764	+0.48%
1990	1,090	+4.54%
1999	1,031	−0.62%
2007	980	−0.63%
2012	976	−0.08%
2017	904	−1.52%
2023	942	+0.69%
Source: INSEE

== See also ==
- Communes of the Eure department
