= Bois-le-Roi, Eure =

Bois-le-Roi
- Commune
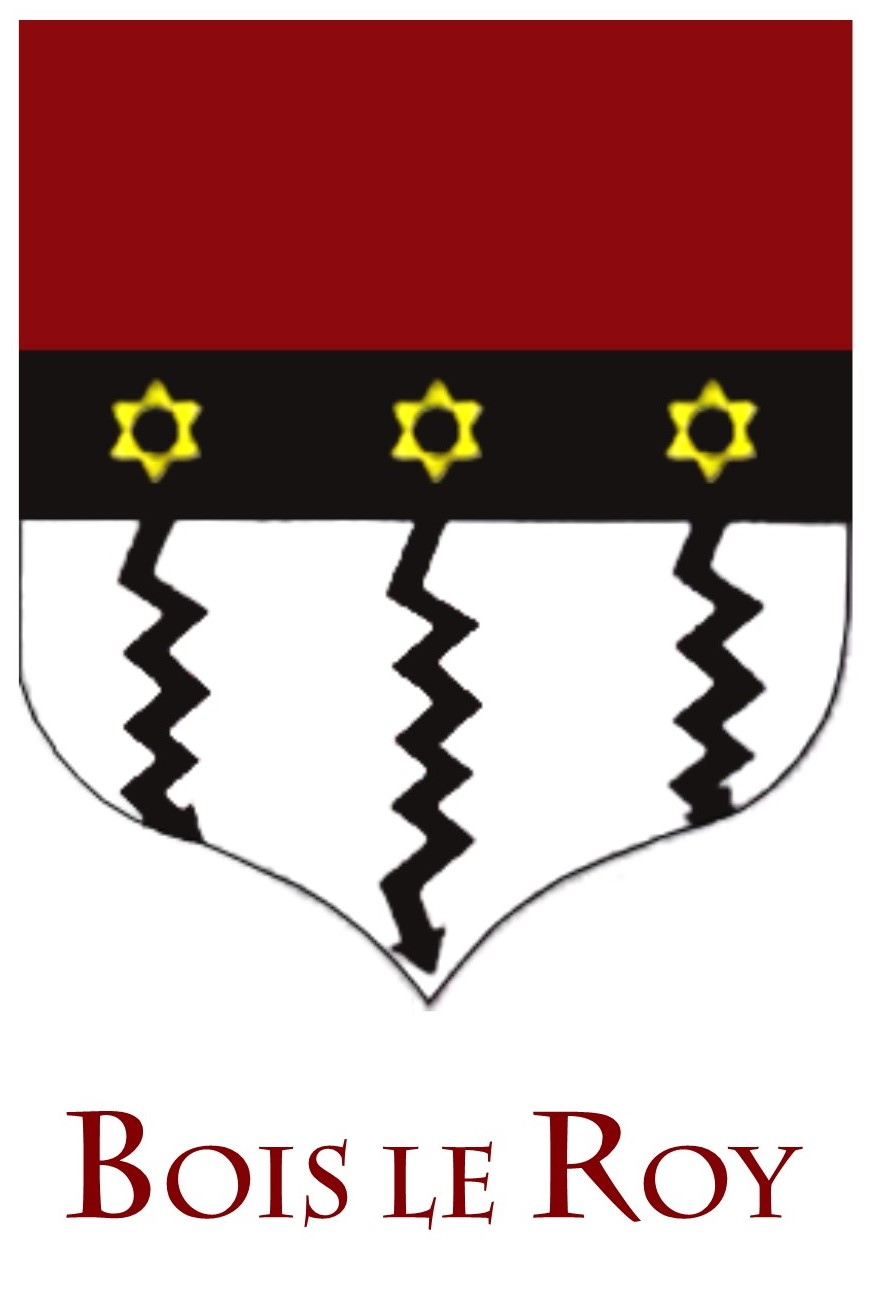
- Coat of arms
- Location of Bois-le-Roi
- Location within France Location within Normandy
- Coordinates: 48°51′50″N 1°20′43″E
- Country: France
- Region: Normandy
- Department: Eure
- Arrondissement: Évreux
- Canton: Saint-André-de-l'Eure
- Intercommunality: CA Évreux Portes de Normandie

Government
  - Mayor (2020–2026): Youssef Errammach
- Area^{1}: 5.42 km^{2} (2.09 sq mi)
- Elevation: 139 m (456 ft)
- Highest elevation: 139 m (456 ft)
- Lowest elevation: 79 m (259 ft)
- Population (2023): 1,238
  - Density: 228/km^{2} (592/sq mi)
- Demonym: Sylvirégicien
- Time zone: UTC+01:00 (CET)
  - Summer (DST): UTC+02:00 (CEST)
- INSEE/Postal code: 27073 /27220
- ^{1} French Land Register data, which excludes lakes, ponds, glaciers > 1 km^{2} (0.386 sq mi or 247 acres) and river estuaries.

Bois-le-Roi (French pronunciation: [bwa l(ə) ʁwa]; lit. 'Wood-the-King'; also Bois-le-Roy) is a commune in the Eure department in Normandy in northern France.

== Population ==
Historical population
Year	Pop.	±% p.a.
1968	301	—
1975	350	+2.18%
1982	500	+5.23%
1990	793	+5.93%
1999	815	+0.30%
2007	930	+1.66%
2012	1,082	+3.07%
2017	1,185	+1.84%
2023	1,238	+0.73%
Source: INSEE

== See also ==
- Communes of the Eure department
