= Fresney =

- Commune
- Location of Fresney
- Location within France Location within Normandy
- Coordinates: 48°57′03″N 1°18′21″E
- Country: France
- Region: Normandy
- Department: Eure
- Arrondissement: Évreux
- Canton: Saint-André-de-l'Eure
- Intercommunality: CA Évreux Portes de Normandie

Government
  - Mayor (2020–2026): Didier Dessaint
- Area^{1}: 6.34 km^{2} (2.45 sq mi)
- Elevation: 153 m (502 ft)
- Highest elevation: 149 m (489 ft)
- Lowest elevation: 132 m (433 ft)
- Population (2023): 314
  - Density: 49.5/km^{2} (128/sq mi)
- Time zone: UTC+01:00 (CET)
  - Summer (DST): UTC+02:00 (CEST)
- INSEE/Postal code: 27271 /27220
- ^{1} French Land Register data, which excludes lakes, ponds, glaciers > 1 km^{2} (0.386 sq mi or 247 acres) and river estuaries.

Fresney (French pronunciation: [fʁɛnɛ]) is a commune in the Eure department in the Normandy region in northern France.

== Population ==
Historical population
Year	Pop.	±% p.a.
1968	159	—
1975	146	−1.21%
1982	179	+2.95%
1990	212	+2.14%
1999	207	−0.26%
2007	246	+2.18%
2012	335	+6.37%
2017	346	+0.65%
2023	314	−1.60%
Source: INSEE

== See also ==
- Communes of the Eure department
