= Croth =

- Commune
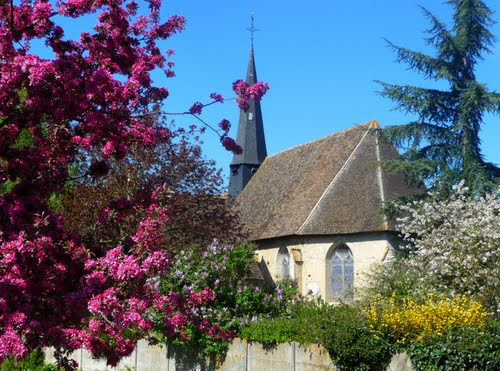
- The church in Croth
- Location of Croth
- Location within France Location within Normandy
- Coordinates: 48°50′44″N 1°22′42″E
- Country: France
- Region: Normandy
- Department: Eure
- Arrondissement: Évreux
- Canton: Saint-André-de-l'Eure
- Intercommunality: CA Évreux Portes de Normandie

Government
  - Mayor (2020–2026): Rosine Coulong
- Area^{1}: 10.51 km^{2} (4.06 sq mi)
- Elevation: 65 m (213 ft)
- Highest elevation: 137 m (449 ft)
- Lowest elevation: 61 m (200 ft)
- Population (2023): 1,416
  - Density: 134.7/km^{2} (348.9/sq mi)
- Time zone: UTC+01:00 (CET)
  - Summer (DST): UTC+02:00 (CEST)
- INSEE/Postal code: 27193 /27530
- ^{1} French Land Register data, which excludes lakes, ponds, glaciers > 1 km^{2} (0.386 sq mi or 247 acres) and river estuaries.

Croth (French pronunciation: [kʁɔt]) is a commune in the Eure department in northern France.

== Population ==
Historical population
Year	Pop.	±% p.a.
1968	538	—
1975	598	+1.52%
1982	764	+3.56%
1990	1,143	+5.16%
1999	1,293	+1.38%
2007	1,288	−0.05%
2012	1,270	−0.28%
2017	1,348	+1.20%
2023	1,416	+0.82%
Source: INSEE

== See also ==
- Communes of the Eure department
