= Serez, Eure =

Serez
- Commune
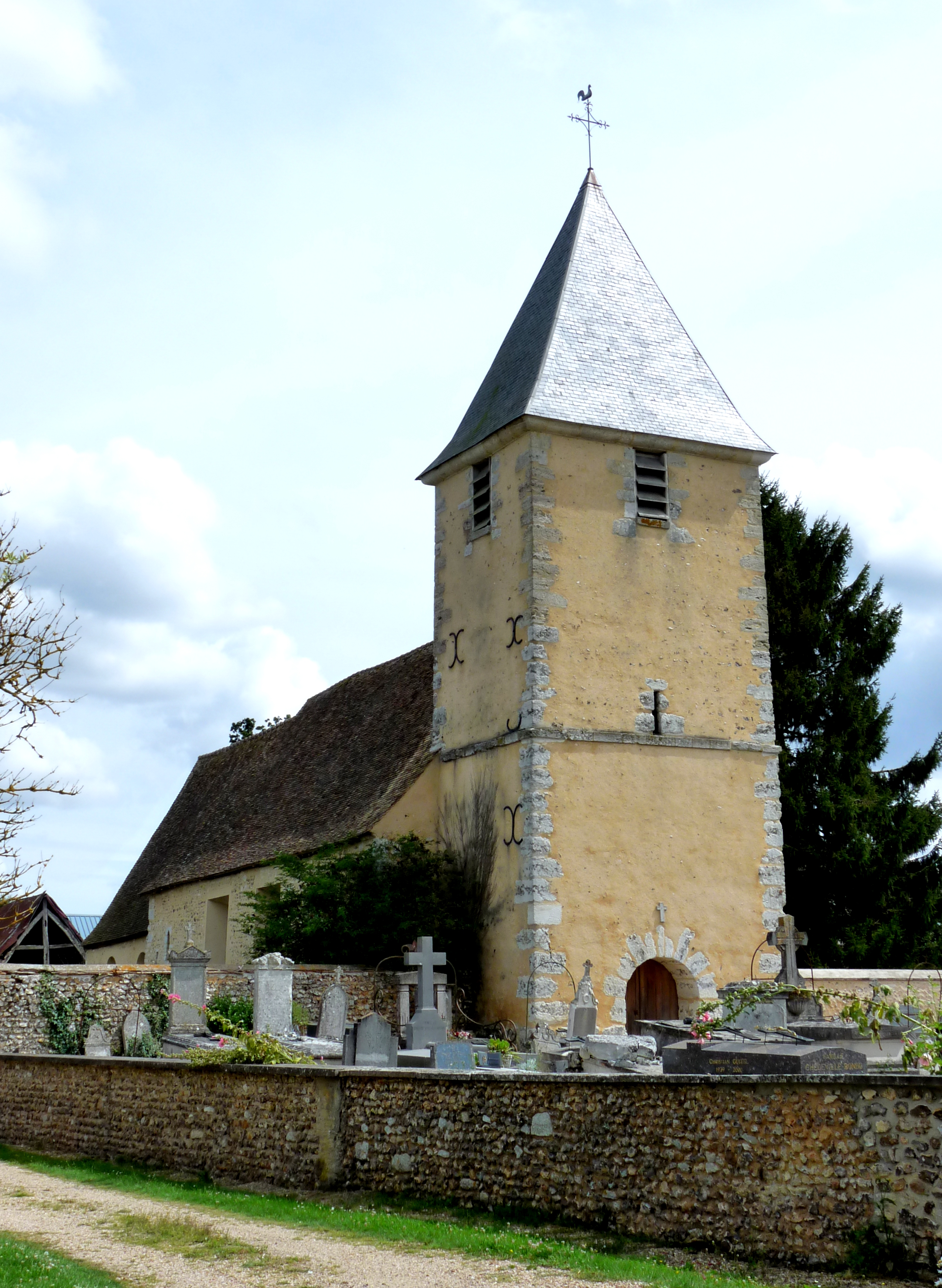
- The church in Serez
- Location of Serez
- Location within France Location within Normandy
- Coordinates: 48°56′05″N 1°21′54″E
- Country: France
- Region: Normandy
- Department: Eure
- Arrondissement: Évreux
- Canton: Saint-André-de-l'Eure
- Intercommunality: CA Évreux Portes de Normandie

Government
  - Mayor (2020–2026): Jean-Michel Cailleux
- Area^{1}: 6.33 km^{2} (2.44 sq mi)
- Elevation: 146 m (479 ft)
- Highest elevation: 144 m (472 ft)
- Lowest elevation: 119 m (390 ft)
- Population (2023): 166
  - Density: 26.2/km^{2} (67.9/sq mi)
- Time zone: UTC+01:00 (CET)
  - Summer (DST): UTC+02:00 (CEST)
- INSEE/Postal code: 27621 /27220
- ^{1} French Land Register data, which excludes lakes, ponds, glaciers > 1 km^{2} (0.386 sq mi or 247 acres) and river estuaries.

Serez (French pronunciation: [səʁe]) is a commune in the Eure department in Normandy in northern France.

== Population ==
Historical population
Year	Pop.	±% p.a.
1968	82	—
1975	74	−1.46%
1982	66	−1.62%
1990	115	+7.19%
1999	129	+1.28%
2007	144	+1.38%
2012	143	−0.14%
2017	154	+1.49%
2023	166	+1.26%
Source: INSEE

== See also ==
- Communes of the Eure department
