= Mouettes =

- Commune
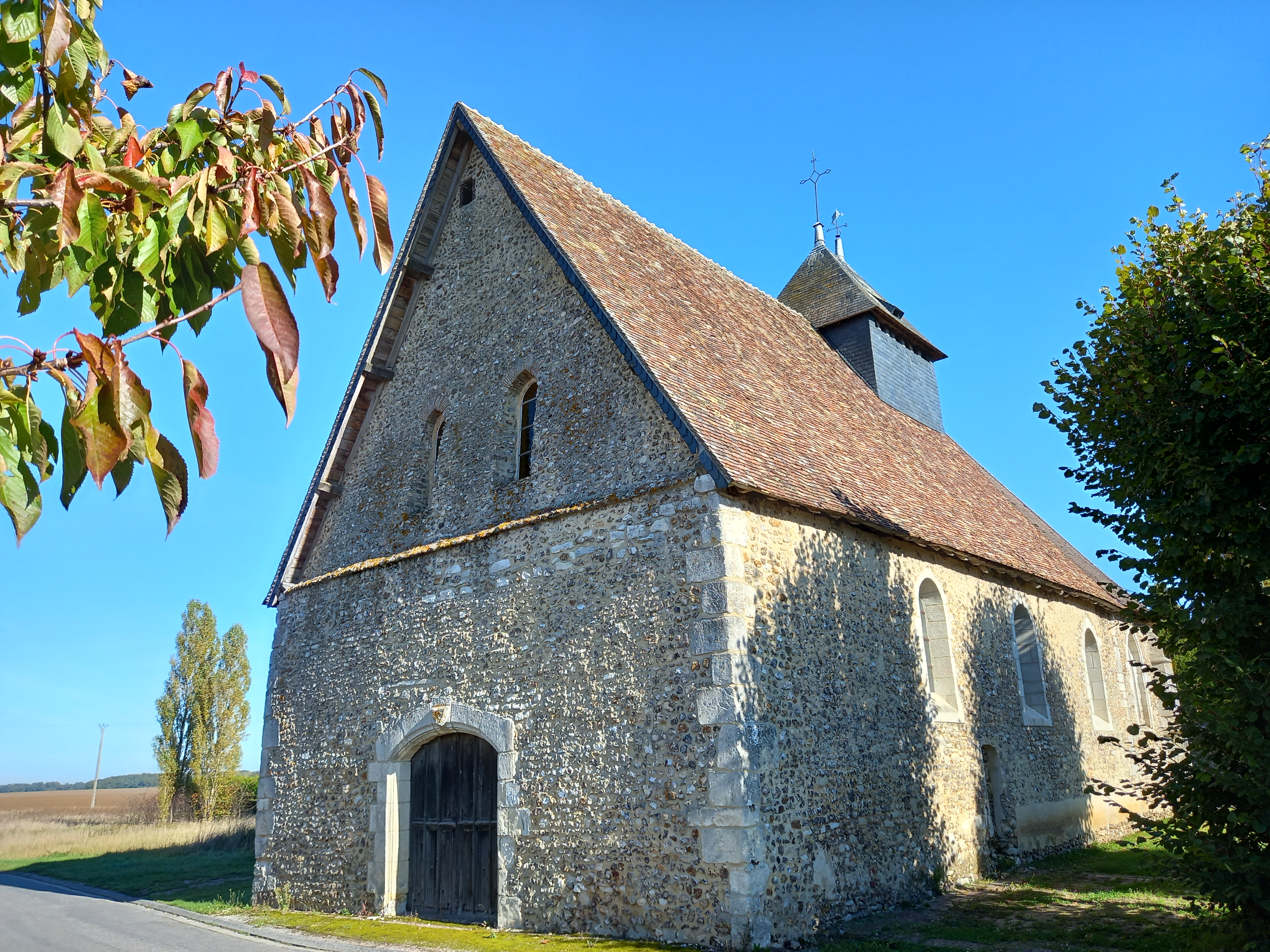
- St Jacques-le-Majeur church

- Coat of arms
- Location of Mouettes
- Location within France Location within Normandy
- Coordinates: 48°53′49″N 1°21′43″E
- Country: France
- Region: Normandy
- Department: Eure
- Arrondissement: Évreux
- Canton: Saint-André-de-l'Eure
- Intercommunality: Évreux Portes de Normandie

Government
  - Mayor (2020–2026): Christophe Carrette
- Area^{1}: 8.39 km^{2} (3.24 sq mi)
- Elevation: 140 m (460 ft)
- Highest elevation: 136 m (446 ft)
- Lowest elevation: 72 m (236 ft)
- Population (2023): 744
  - Density: 88.7/km^{2} (230/sq mi)
- Time zone: UTC+01:00 (CET)
  - Summer (DST): UTC+02:00 (CEST)
- INSEE/Postal code: 27419 /27220
- ^{1} French Land Register data, which excludes lakes, ponds, glaciers > 1 km^{2} (0.386 sq mi or 247 acres) and river estuaries.

Mouettes (French pronunciation: [mwɛt]) is a commune in the Eure department in Normandy in northern France.

== Population ==
Historical population
Year	Pop.	±% p.a.
1968	228	—
1975	233	+0.31%
1982	292	+3.28%
1990	484	+6.52%
1999	566	+1.75%
2007	700	+2.69%
2012	709	+0.26%
2017	786	+2.08%
2023	744	−0.91%
Source: INSEE

== See also ==
- Communes of the Eure department
