= Jumelles, Eure =

Jumelles
- Commune
- Location of Jumelles
- Location within France Location within Normandy
- Coordinates: 48°54′58″N 1°12′33″E
- Country: France
- Region: Normandy
- Department: Eure
- Arrondissement: Évreux
- Canton: Saint-André-de-l'Eure
- Intercommunality: CA Évreux Portes de Normandie

Government
  - Mayor (2020–2026): Carine Bonnard
- Area^{1}: 7.29 km^{2} (2.81 sq mi)
- Elevation: 138 m (453 ft)
- Highest elevation: 154 m (505 ft)
- Lowest elevation: 143 m (469 ft)
- Population (2023): 324
  - Density: 44.4/km^{2} (115/sq mi)
- Time zone: UTC+01:00 (CET)
  - Summer (DST): UTC+02:00 (CEST)
- INSEE/Postal code: 27360 /27220
- ^{1} French Land Register data, which excludes lakes, ponds, glaciers > 1 km^{2} (0.386 sq mi or 247 acres) and river estuaries.

Jumelles (French pronunciation: [ʒymɛl]) is a commune in the Eure department in Normandy in northern France.

== Population ==
Historical population
Year	Pop.	±% p.a.
1968	106	—
1975	106	+0.00%
1982	190	+8.69%
1990	227	+2.25%
1999	255	+1.30%
2007	297	+1.92%
2012	307	+0.66%
2017	321	+0.90%
2023	324	+0.16%
Source: INSEE

== See also ==
- Communes of the Eure department
