= Sainte-Croix, Mauritius =

Suburb in Port Louis, Mauritius

Coordinates: 20.15°S 57.525°E

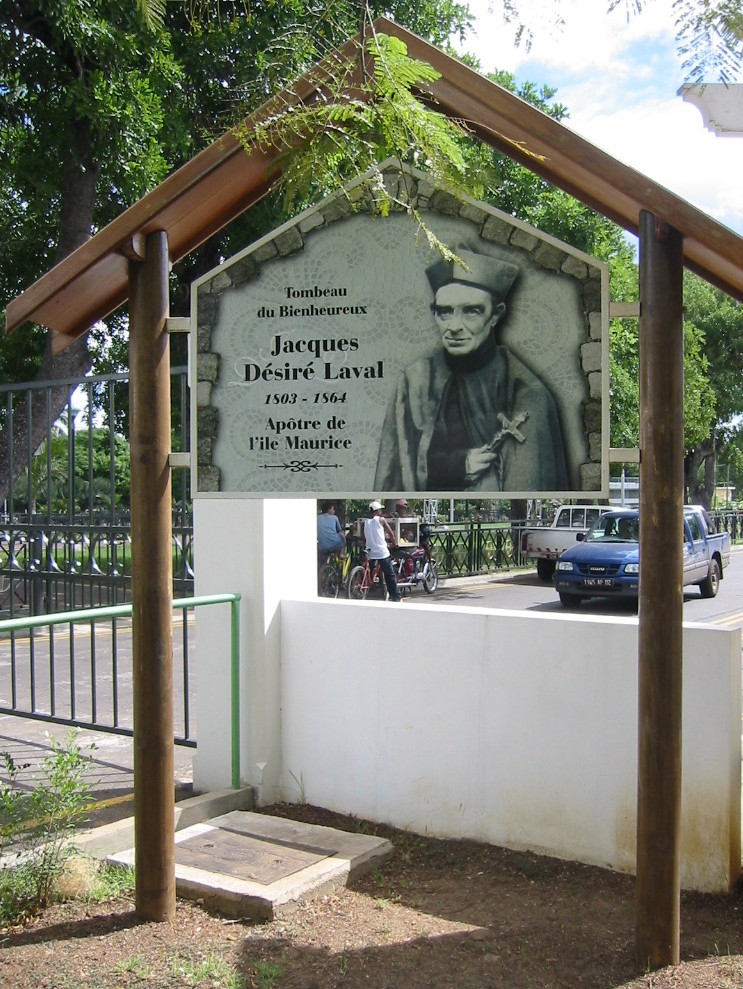
A sign in Sainte-Croix marking the tomb of Blessed Jacques Laval

Sainte-Croix is a suburb of the capital city, Port Louis, in Mauritius, an independent island in the Indian Ocean.

It is most famous for its association with the Roman Catholic beatus Jacques-Désiré Laval, who worked in Sainte-Croix as a missionary from 1841 until his death in 1864. He is now buried at the Church of Sainte-Croix, and is thus a place of pilgrimage for Catholics in Mauritius.

This place is mentioned in the popular song "Ki Zot Problem" as being one the famous "ghetto" places of Mauritius along with Roche Bois, Batterie Kase, Cite Barkly and Cite St Clair.
