= Saint-André-de-l'Eure =

- Commune
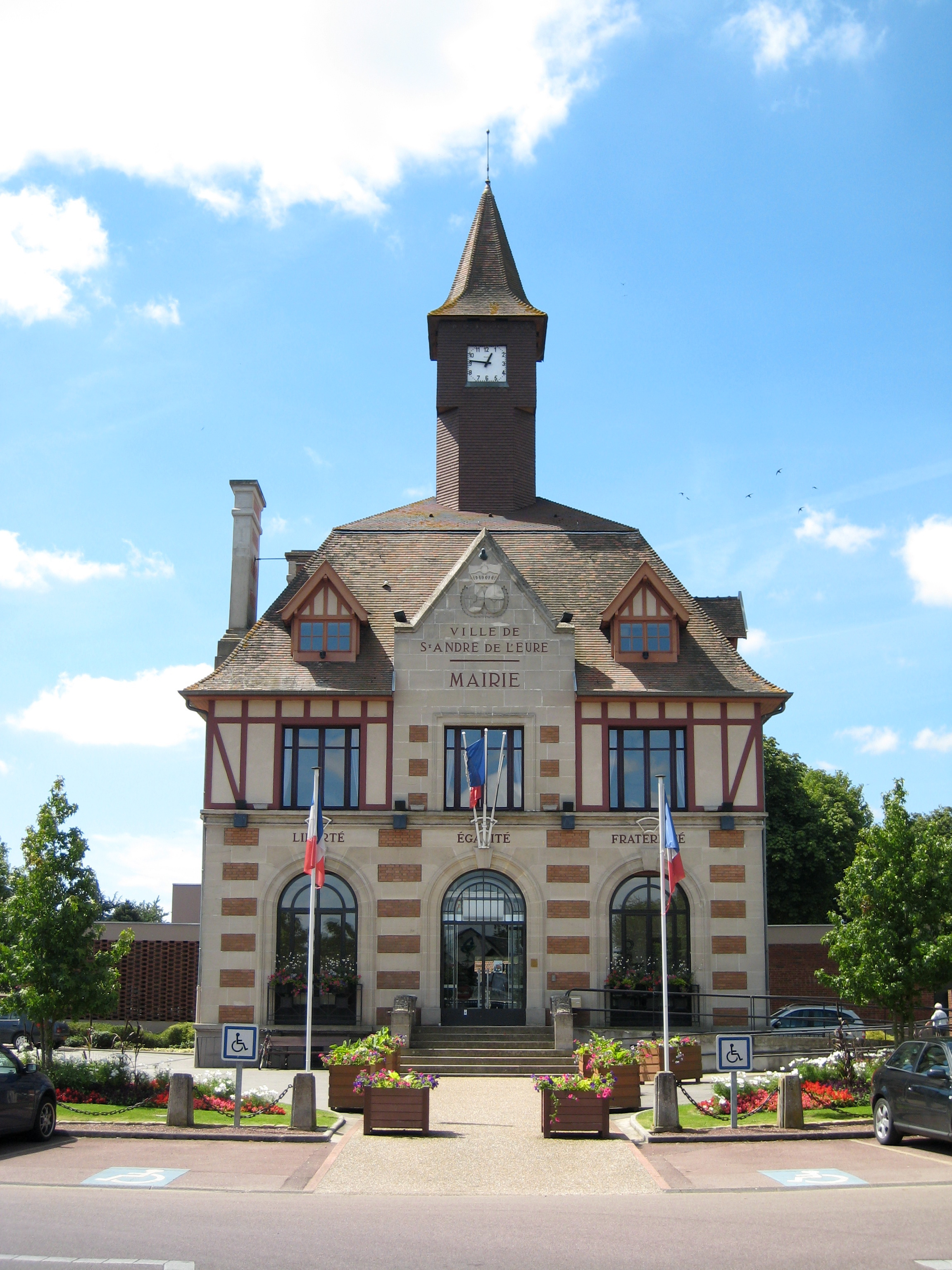
- Town hall

- Coat of arms
- Location of Saint-André-de-l'Eure
- Location within France Location within Normandy
- Coordinates: 48°54′27″N 1°16′38″E
- Country: France
- Region: Normandy
- Department: Eure
- Arrondissement: Évreux
- Canton: Saint-André-de-l'Eure
- Intercommunality: CA Évreux Portes de Normandie

Government
  - Mayor (2020–2026): Franck Bernard
- Area^{1}: 19.83 km^{2} (7.66 sq mi)
- Highest elevation: 149 m (489 ft)
- Lowest elevation: 120 m (390 ft)
- Population (2023): 3,829
  - Density: 193.1/km^{2} (500.1/sq mi)
- Time zone: UTC+01:00 (CET)
  - Summer (DST): UTC+02:00 (CEST)
- INSEE/Postal code: 27507 /27220
- Dialling codes: 332
- ^{1} French Land Register data, which excludes lakes, ponds, glaciers > 1 km^{2} (0.386 sq mi or 247 acres) and river estuaries.

Saint-André-de-l'Eure is a commune in the Eure department in Normandy in northern France.

== Population ==
Historical population
Year	Pop.	±% p.a.
1968	2,013	—
1975	2,490	+3.08%
1982	2,703	+1.18%
1990	3,110	+1.77%
1999	3,258	+0.52%
2007	3,385	+0.48%
2012	3,720	+1.91%
2017	3,988	+1.40%
2023	3,829	−0.68%
Source: INSEE

== See also ==
- Communes of the Eure department
