= Canton of Saint-André-de-l'Eure =

Coordinates: 48.91°N 1.27°E

The canton of Saint-André-de-l'Eure is an administrative division of the Eure department, northern France. Its borders were modified at the French canton reorganisation which came into effect in March 2015. Its seat is in Saint-André-de-l'Eure.

It consists of the following communes:

1. Les Authieux
2. La Baronnie
3. Bois-le-Roi
4. Bretagnolles
5. Champigny-la-Futelaye
6. Chavigny-Bailleul
7. Coudres
8. La Couture-Boussey
9. Croth
10. Épieds
11. Ézy-sur-Eure
12. La Forêt-du-Parc
13. Foucrainville
14. Fresney
15. Garennes-sur-Eure
16. Grossœuvre
17. L'Habit
18. Ivry-la-Bataille
19. Jumelles
20. Lignerolles
21. Louye
22. Marcilly-sur-Eure
23. Mesnil-sur-l'Estrée
24. Mouettes
25. Mousseaux-Neuville
26. Muzy
27. Prey
28. Saint-André-de-l'Eure
29. Saint-Georges-Motel
30. Saint-Germain-de-Fresney
31. Saint-Laurent-des-Bois
32. Serez
