= Canton of Évreux-Ouest =

Former canton in Eure département, France

Coordinates: 49°01′28″N 1°09′04″E

The canton of Évreux-Ouest is a former canton situated in the Eure département, France. It had 19,118 inhabitants (2012). It was disbanded following the French canton reorganisation which came into effect in March 2015. It included a part of Évreux and the communes of Arnières-sur-Iton, Aulnay-sur-Iton, Caugé, Claville and Saint-Sébastien-de-Morsent.
