= Le Mesnil-Hardray =

- Part of Le Val-Doré
- Location of Le Mesnil-Hardray
- Location within France Location within Normandy
- Coordinates: 48°56′12″N 0°59′26″E
- Country: France
- Region: Normandy
- Department: Eure
- Arrondissement: Évreux
- Canton: Conches-en-Ouche
- Commune: Le Val-Doré
- Area^{1}: 4.84 km^{2} (1.87 sq mi)
- Elevation: 173 m (568 ft)
- Highest elevation: 175 m (574 ft)
- Lowest elevation: 151 m (495 ft)
- Population (2019): 69
  - Density: 14/km^{2} (37/sq mi)
- Time zone: UTC+01:00 (CET)
  - Summer (DST): UTC+02:00 (CEST)
- Postal code: 27190
- ^{1} French Land Register data, which excludes lakes, ponds, glaciers > 1 km^{2} (0.386 sq mi or 247 acres) and river estuaries.

Le Mesnil-Hardray (French pronunciation: [lə mɛnil aʁdʁɛ]) is a former commune in the Eure department in Normandy in northern France. On 1 January 2018, it was merged into the new commune of Le Val-Doré.

== See also ==
- Communes of the Eure department
