= Le Fresne, Eure =

Le Fresne
- Part of Le Val-Doré
- Coat of arms
- Location of Le Fresne
- Location within France Location within Normandy
- Coordinates: 48°57′05″N 0°58′35″E
- Country: France
- Region: Normandy
- Department: Eure
- Arrondissement: Évreux
- Canton: Conches-en-Ouche
- Commune: Le Val-Doré
- Area^{1}: 9.13 km^{2} (3.53 sq mi)
- Elevation: 159 m (522 ft)
- Highest elevation: 166 m (545 ft)
- Lowest elevation: 95 m (312 ft)
- Population (2019): 327
  - Density: 35.8/km^{2} (92.8/sq mi)
- Time zone: UTC+01:00 (CET)
  - Summer (DST): UTC+02:00 (CEST)
- Postal code: 27190
- ^{1} French Land Register data, which excludes lakes, ponds, glaciers > 1 km^{2} (0.386 sq mi or 247 acres) and river estuaries.

Le Fresne (French pronunciation: [lə fʁɛn]) is a former commune in the Eure department in the Normandy region in northern France. On 1 January 2018, it was merged into the new commune of Le Val-Doré.

== See also ==
- Communes of the Eure department
