= Orvaux =

- Part of Le Val-Doré
- Coat of arms
- Location of Orvaux
- Location within France Location within Normandy
- Coordinates: 48°56′24″N 1°02′03″E
- Country: France
- Region: Normandy
- Department: Eure
- Arrondissement: Évreux
- Canton: Conches-en-Ouche
- Commune: Le Val-Doré
- Area^{1}: 6.2 km^{2} (2.4 sq mi)
- Elevation: 164 m (538 ft)
- Highest elevation: 160 m (520 ft)
- Lowest elevation: 103 m (338 ft)
- Population (2019): 502
  - Density: 81/km^{2} (210/sq mi)
- Time zone: UTC+01:00 (CET)
  - Summer (DST): UTC+02:00 (CEST)
- Postal code: 27190
- ^{1} French Land Register data, which excludes lakes, ponds, glaciers > 1 km^{2} (0.386 sq mi or 247 acres) and river estuaries.

Orvaux (French pronunciation: [ɔʁvo]) is a former commune in the Eure department in Normandy in northern France. On 1 January 2018, it was merged into the new commune of Le Val-Doré.

== Population ==
Historical population
Year	Pop.	±% p.a.
1962	100	—
1968	90	−1.74%
1975	95	+0.78%
1982	174	+9.03%
1990	286	+6.41%
1999	384	+3.33%
2006	487	+3.45%
2019	502	+0.23%
Source: EHESS and INSEE

== See also ==
- Communes of the Eure department
