= Tilleul-Dame-Agnès =

- Commune
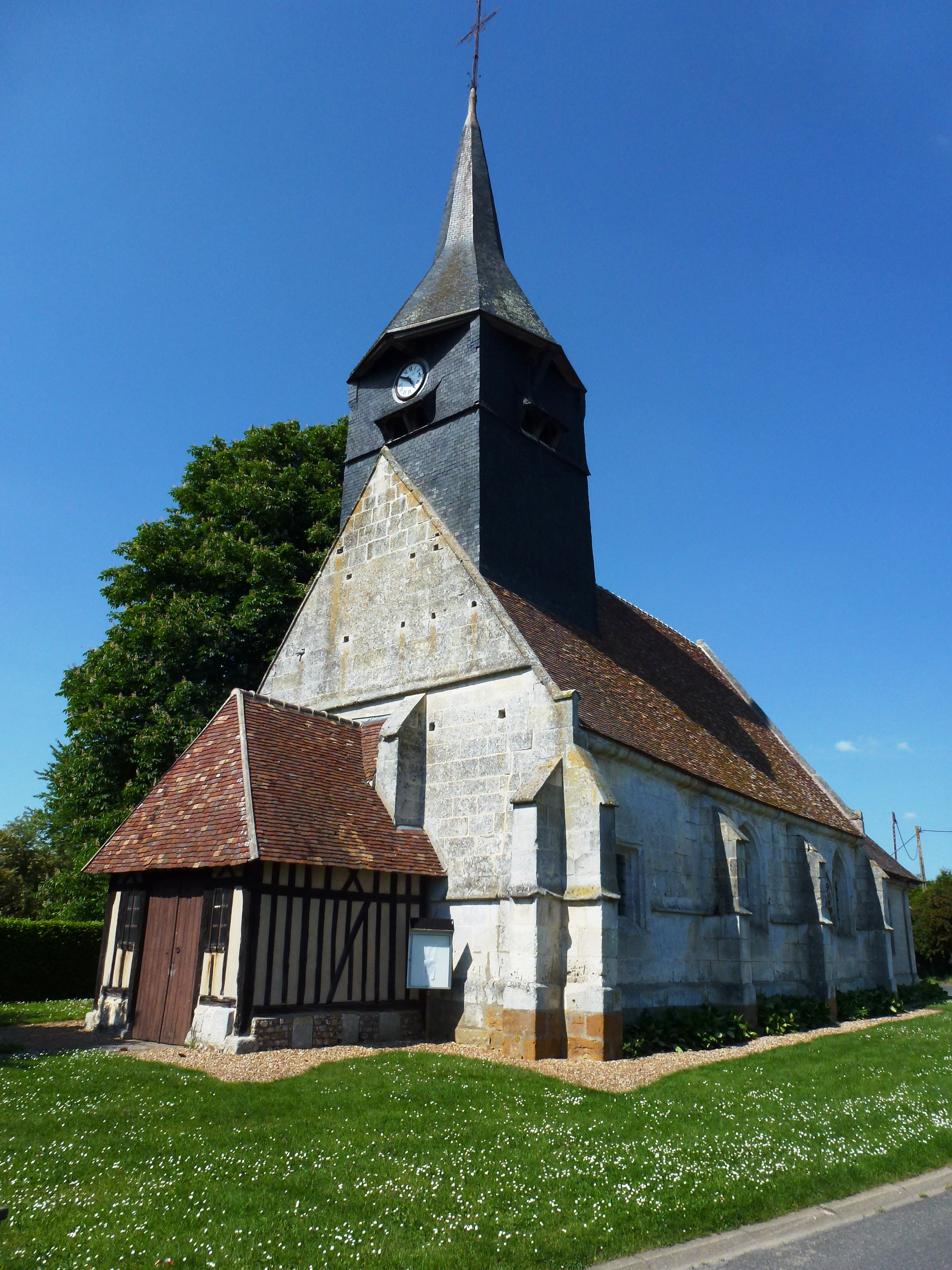
- The church in Tilleul-Dame-Agnès
- Location of Tilleul-Dame-Agnès
- Location within France Location within Normandy
- Coordinates: 49°00′16″N 0°53′25″E
- Country: France
- Region: Normandy
- Department: Eure
- Arrondissement: Évreux
- Canton: Conches-en-Ouche

Government
  - Mayor (2020–2026): Stéphane Guerin
- Area^{1}: 5.12 km^{2} (1.98 sq mi)
- Elevation: 159 m (522 ft)
- Highest elevation: 159 m (522 ft)
- Lowest elevation: 147 m (482 ft)
- Population (2023): 200
  - Density: 39/km^{2} (100/sq mi)
- Time zone: UTC+01:00 (CET)
  - Summer (DST): UTC+02:00 (CEST)
- INSEE/Postal code: 27640 /27170
- ^{1} French Land Register data, which excludes lakes, ponds, glaciers > 1 km^{2} (0.386 sq mi or 247 acres) and river estuaries.

Tilleul-Dame-Agnès (French pronunciation: [tijœl dam aɲɛs]) is a commune in the Eure department in Normandy in northern France.

== Population ==
Historical population
Year	Pop.	±% p.a.
1968	144	—
1975	146	+0.20%
1982	135	−1.11%
1990	155	+1.74%
1999	174	+1.29%
2007	218	+2.86%
2012	198	−1.91%
2017	195	−0.30%
2023	200	+0.42%
Source: INSEE

== See also ==
- Communes of the Eure department
