= Burey =

- Commune
- Location of Burey
- Location within France Location within Normandy
- Coordinates: 48°59′07″N 0°57′07″E
- Country: France
- Region: Normandy
- Department: Eure
- Arrondissement: Évreux
- Canton: Conches-en-Ouche
- Intercommunality: Pays de Conches

Government
  - Mayor (2020–2026): Serge Bourlier
- Area^{1}: 5.4 km^{2} (2.1 sq mi)
- Elevation: 145 m (476 ft)
- Highest elevation: 162 m (531 ft)
- Lowest elevation: 137 m (449 ft)
- Population (2023): 410
  - Density: 76/km^{2} (200/sq mi)
- Time zone: UTC+01:00 (CET)
  - Summer (DST): UTC+02:00 (CEST)
- INSEE/Postal code: 27120 /27190
- ^{1} French Land Register data, which excludes lakes, ponds, glaciers > 1 km^{2} (0.386 sq mi or 247 acres) and river estuaries.

Burey (French pronunciation: [byʁɛ]) is a commune in the Eure department in Normandy in northern France.

== Population ==
Historical population
Year	Pop.	±% p.a.
1968	130	—
1975	144	+1.47%
1982	180	+3.24%
1990	232	+3.22%
1999	245	+0.61%
2007	320	+3.39%
2012	379	+3.44%
2017	400	+1.08%
2023	410	+0.41%
Source: INSEE

== See also ==
- Communes of the Eure department
