= Iton =

River in France

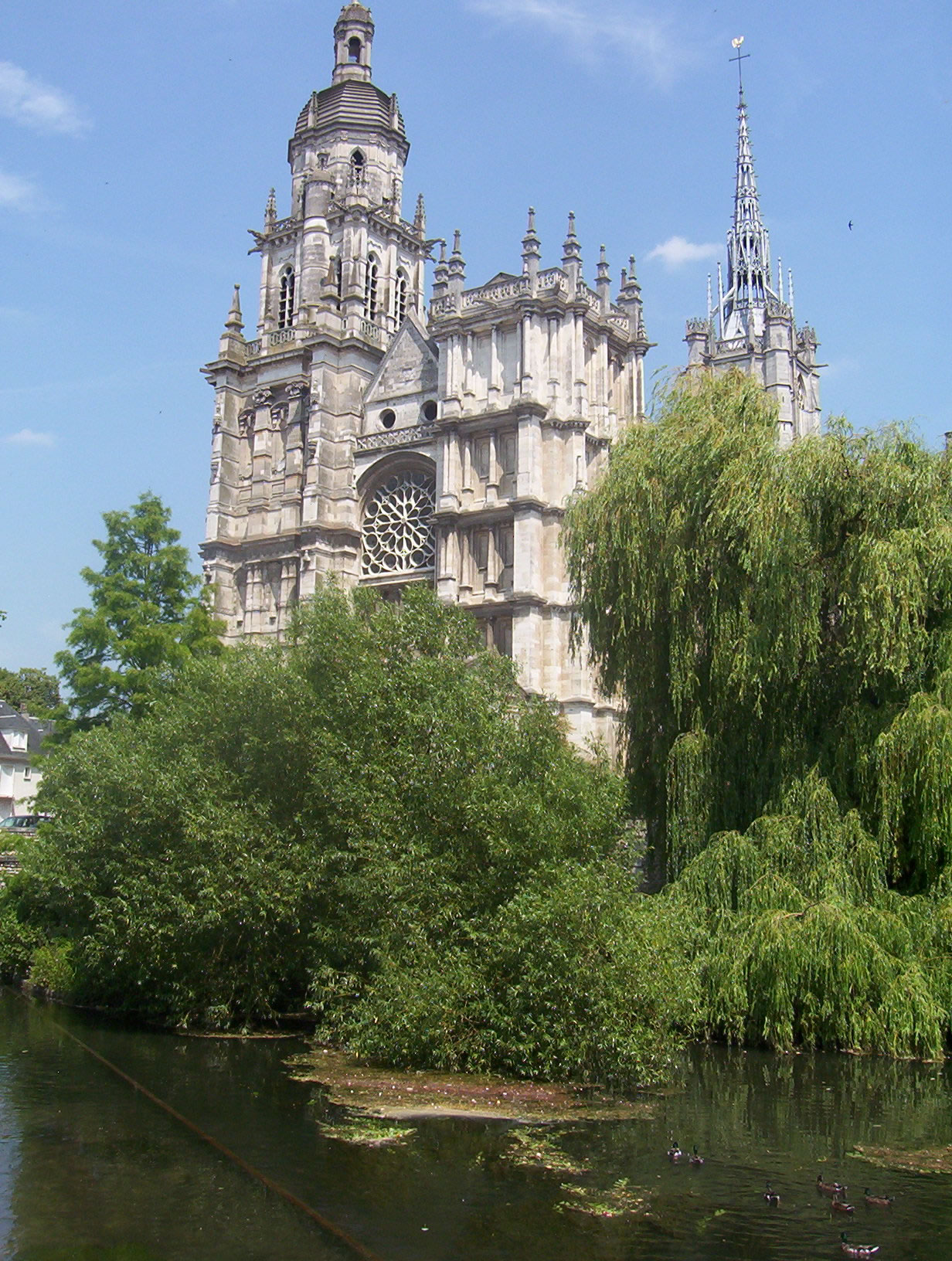
- The Iton in Évreux, seen with the Cathderal

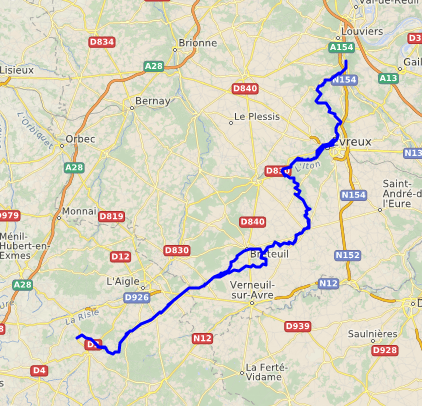

Location
- Country: France

Physical characteristics
- Source
  - location: Normandy
- Mouth
  - location: Eure
  - coordinates: 49°10′29″N 1°11′11″E
- Length: 132 km (82 mi)
- Basin size: 1,300 km^{2} (500 sq mi)

Basin features
- Progression: Eure→ Seine→ English Channel

The Iton (French pronunciation: [itɔ̃]) is a river in Normandy, France, left tributary of the river Eure. It is 131.8 km (81.9 mi) long. Its source is near Moulins-la-Marche. For about 10 km between Orvaux and Glisolles, it disappears and pursues a subterranean course.

The Iton flows through the following départements and towns:

- Orne: Crulai, Chandai
- Eure: Bourth, Damville, La Bonneville-sur-Iton, Évreux

It flows into the Eure in Acquigny, south of Louviers.

Its basin (1,300 km²) covers 134 communes and is subject to a schéma d'aménagement et de gestion des eaux (water management scheme).
