= Champ-Dolent =

- Commune
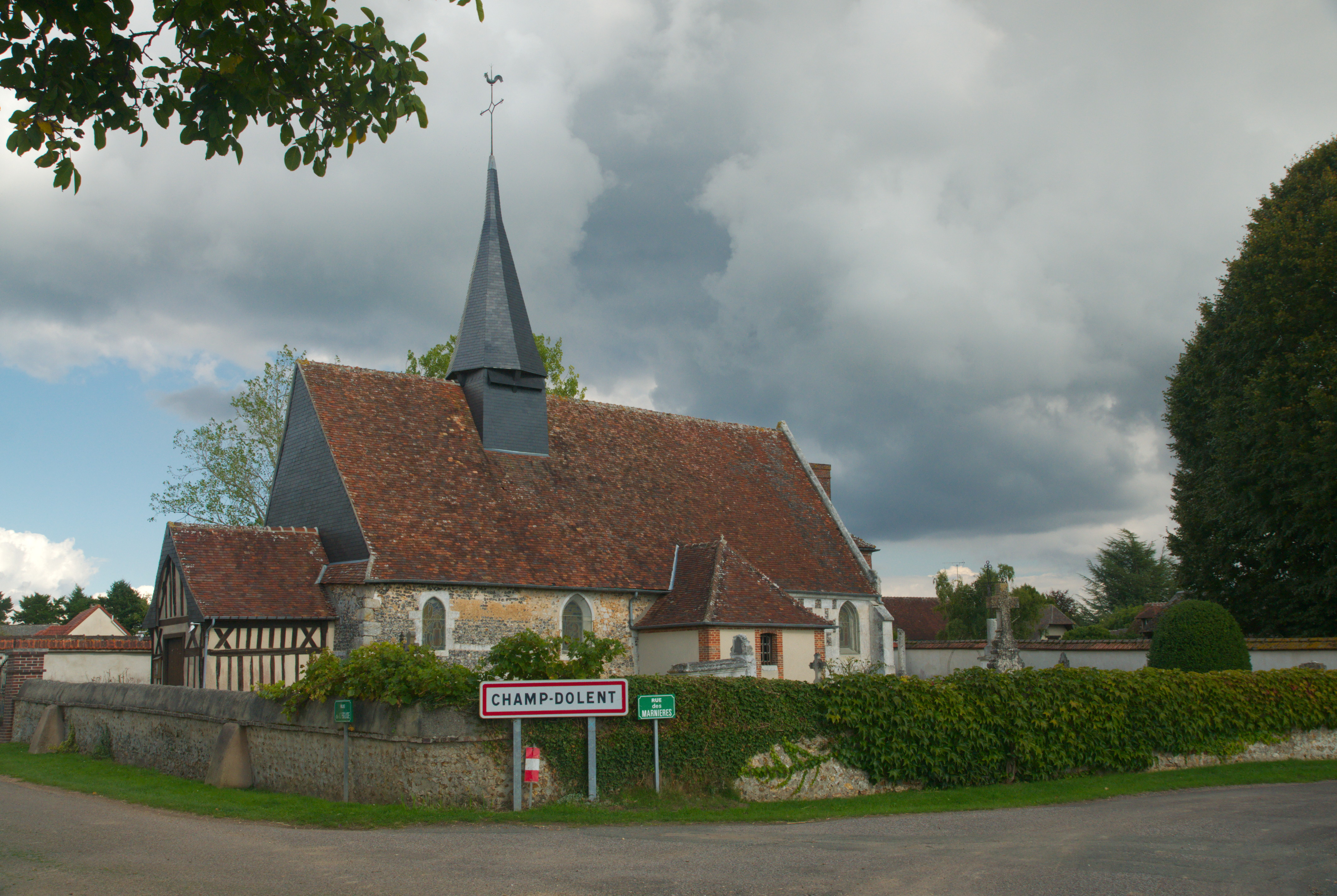
- The church in Champ-Dolent

- Coat of arms
- Location of Champ-Dolent
- Location within France Location within Normandy
- Coordinates: 48°57′39″N 1°00′52″E
- Country: France
- Region: Normandy
- Department: Eure
- Arrondissement: Évreux
- Canton: Conches-en-Ouche
- Intercommunality: Pays de Conches

Government
  - Mayor (2020–2026): Philippe Lefort
- Area^{1}: 2.28 km^{2} (0.88 sq mi)
- Elevation: 160 m (520 ft)
- Highest elevation: 159 m (522 ft)
- Lowest elevation: 135 m (443 ft)
- Population (2023): 63
  - Density: 28/km^{2} (72/sq mi)
- Time zone: UTC+01:00 (CET)
  - Summer (DST): UTC+02:00 (CEST)
- INSEE/Postal code: 27141 /27190
- ^{1} French Land Register data, which excludes lakes, ponds, glaciers > 1 km^{2} (0.386 sq mi or 247 acres) and river estuaries.

Champ-Dolent (French pronunciation: [ʃɑ̃ dɔlɑ̃]) is a commune in the Eure department in northern France.

== Population ==
Historical population
Year	Pop.	±% p.a.
1968	40	—
1975	41	+0.35%
1982	45	+1.34%
1990	45	+0.00%
1999	40	−1.30%
2007	49	+2.57%
2012	63	+5.15%
2017	66	+0.93%
2023	63	−0.77%
Source: INSEE

== See also ==
- Communes of the Eure department
