= Portes, Eure =

Portes
- Commune
- Location of Portes
- Location within France Location within Normandy
- Coordinates: 49°01′50″N 0°57′14″E
- Country: France
- Region: Normandy
- Department: Eure
- Arrondissement: Évreux
- Canton: Conches-en-Ouche
- Intercommunality: Pays de Conches

Government
  - Mayor (2020–2026): Marcel Sapowicz
- Area^{1}: 9.44 km^{2} (3.64 sq mi)
- Elevation: 147 m (482 ft)
- Highest elevation: 158 m (518 ft)
- Lowest elevation: 119 m (390 ft)
- Population (2023): 261
  - Density: 27.6/km^{2} (71.6/sq mi)
- Time zone: UTC+01:00 (CET)
  - Summer (DST): UTC+02:00 (CEST)
- INSEE/Postal code: 27472 /27190
- ^{1} French Land Register data, which excludes lakes, ponds, glaciers > 1 km^{2} (0.386 sq mi or 247 acres) and river estuaries.

Portes is a commune in the Eure department in Normandy in northern France.

== Population ==
Historical population
Year	Pop.	±% p.a.
1968	119	—
1975	141	+2.45%
1982	163	+2.09%
1990	194	+2.20%
1999	192	−0.12%
2007	259	+3.81%
2012	270	+0.84%
2017	271	+0.07%
2023	261	−0.62%
Source: INSEE

== See also ==
- Communes of the Eure department
