= La Ferrière-sur-Risle =

- Commune
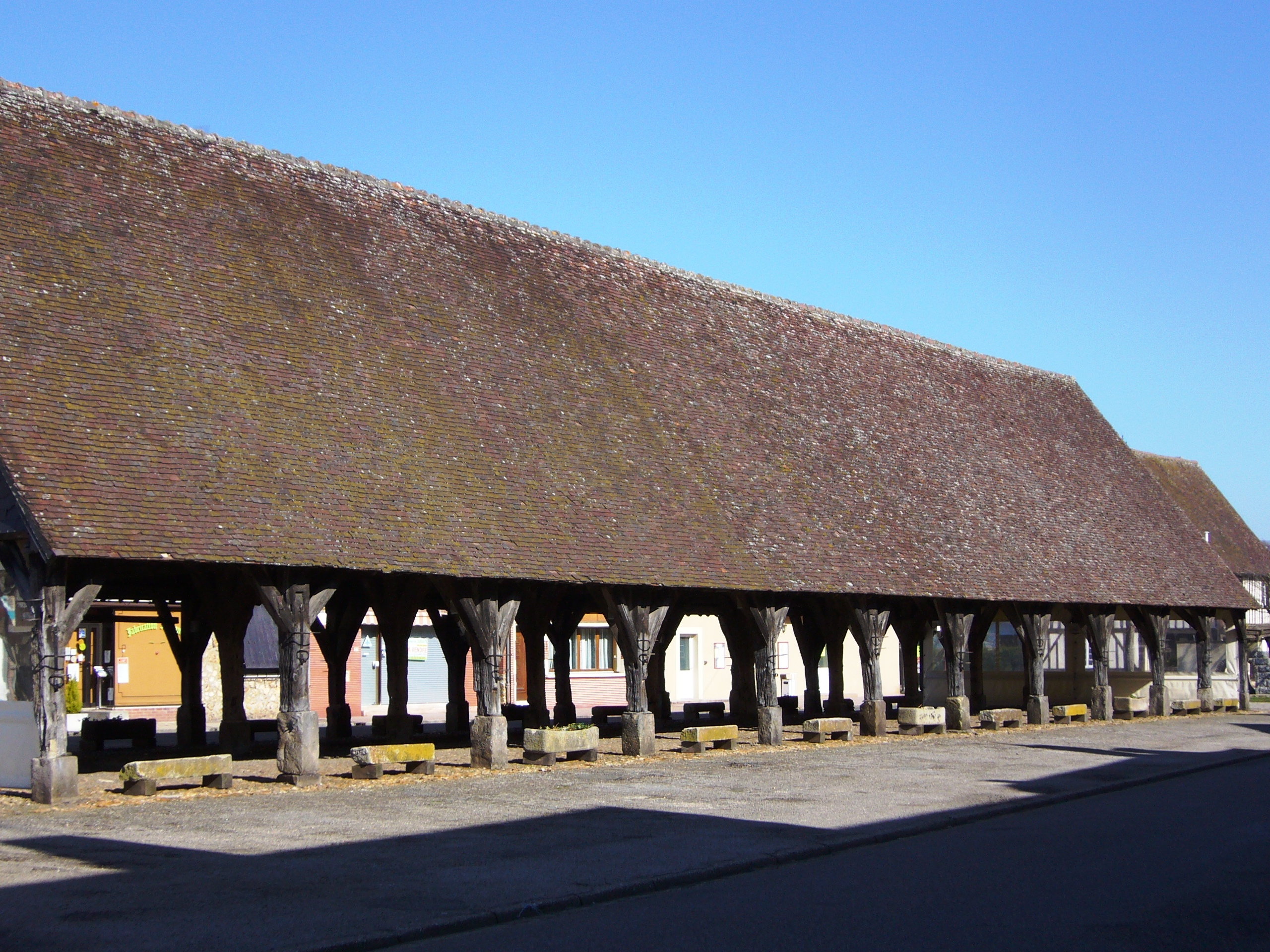
- Medieval market hall
- Location of La Ferrière-sur-Risle
- Location within France Location within Normandy
- Coordinates: 48°58′44″N 0°47′12″E
- Country: France
- Region: Normandy
- Department: Eure
- Arrondissement: Évreux
- Canton: Conches-en-Ouche

Government
  - Mayor (2020–2026): Marc Garreaud
- Area^{1}: 0.2 km^{2} (0.077 sq mi)
- Elevation: 162 m (531 ft)
- Highest elevation: 155 m (509 ft)
- Lowest elevation: 124 m (407 ft)
- Population (2023): 191
  - Density: 960/km^{2} (2,500/sq mi)
- Time zone: UTC+01:00 (CET)
  - Summer (DST): UTC+02:00 (CEST)
- INSEE/Postal code: 27240 /27760
- ^{1} French Land Register data, which excludes lakes, ponds, glaciers > 1 km^{2} (0.386 sq mi or 247 acres) and river estuaries.

La Ferrière-sur-Risle (French pronunciation: [la fɛʁjɛʁ syʁ ʁil], literally La Ferrière on Risle) is a commune in the Eure department in the Normandy region in northern France.

== Geography ==
The commune along with another 69 communes shares part of a 4,747 hectare, Natura 2000 conservation area, called Risle, Guiel, Charentonne.

== Population ==
Historical population
Year	Pop.	±% p.a.
1968	385	—
1975	336	−1.93%
1982	309	−1.19%
1990	241	−3.06%
1999	247	+0.27%
2007	278	+1.49%
2012	244	−2.58%
2017	221	−1.96%
2023	191	−2.40%
Source: INSEE

== See also ==
- Communes of the Eure department
