= Le Fidelaire =

- Commune
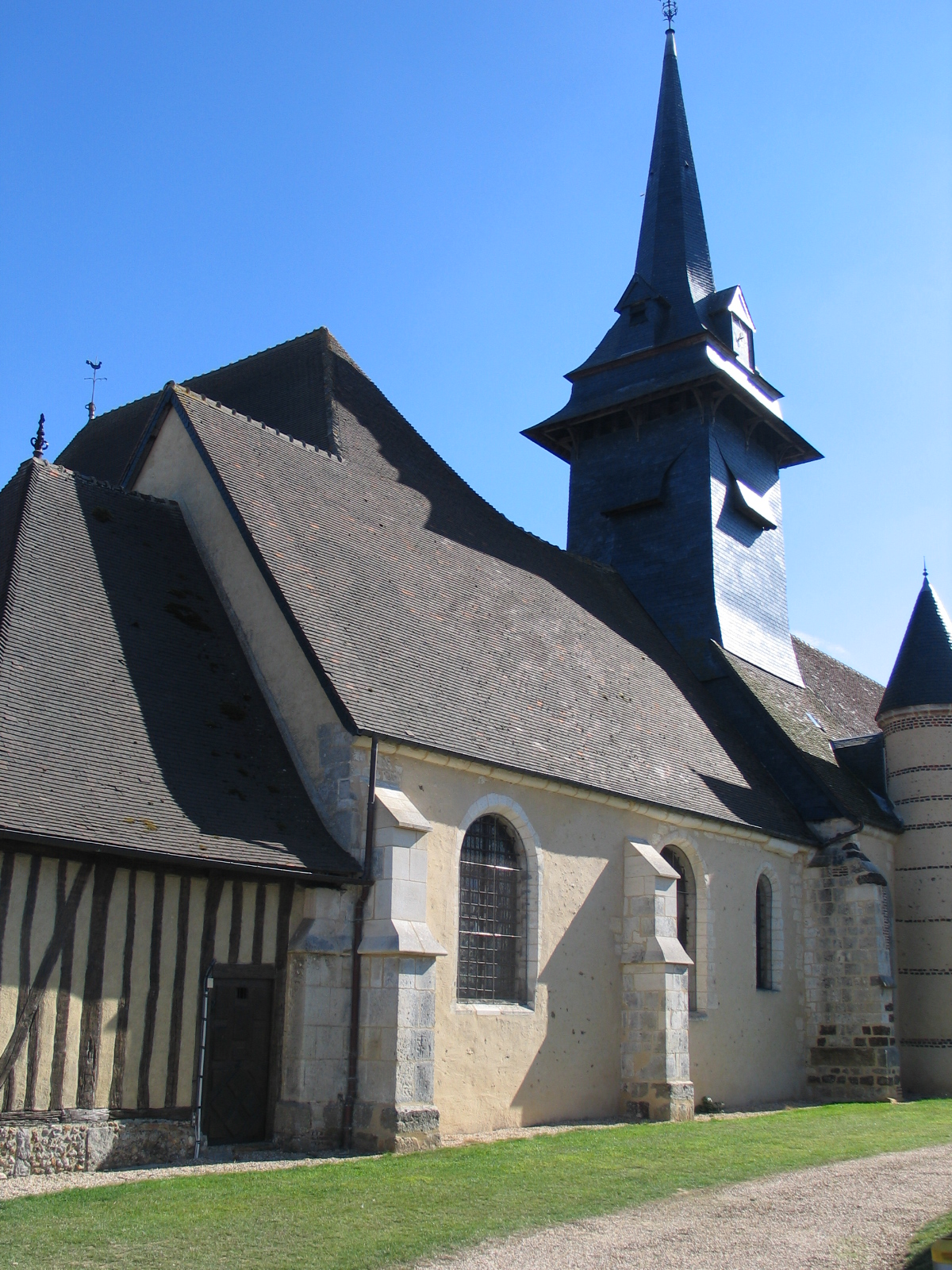
- The church in Le Fidelaire

- Coat of arms
- Location of Le Fidelaire
- Location within France Location within Normandy
- Coordinates: 48°57′02″N 0°48′57″E
- Country: France
- Region: Normandy
- Department: Eure
- Arrondissement: Évreux
- Canton: Conches-en-Ouche
- Intercommunality: CC du Pays de Conches

Government
  - Mayor (2020–2026): Jean-Claude Dufossey
- Area^{1}: 33.55 km^{2} (12.95 sq mi)
- Elevation: 184 m (604 ft)
- Highest elevation: 190 m (620 ft)
- Lowest elevation: 150 m (490 ft)
- Population (2023): 1,025
  - Density: 30.55/km^{2} (79.13/sq mi)
- Time zone: UTC+01:00 (CET)
  - Summer (DST): UTC+02:00 (CEST)
- INSEE/Postal code: 27242 /27190
- ^{1} French Land Register data, which excludes lakes, ponds, glaciers > 1 km^{2} (0.386 sq mi or 247 acres) and river estuaries.

Le Fidelaire (French pronunciation: [lə fidlɛʁ]) is a commune in the Eure department and Normandy region of northern France.

== Population ==
Historical population
Year	Pop.	±% p.a.
1968	727	—
1975	698	−0.58%
1982	680	−0.37%
1990	690	+0.18%
1999	763	+1.12%
2007	954	+2.83%
2012	1,000	+0.95%
2017	1,024	+0.48%
2023	1,025	+0.02%
Source: INSEE

== See also ==
- Communes of the Eure department
