= Sébécourt =

- Commune
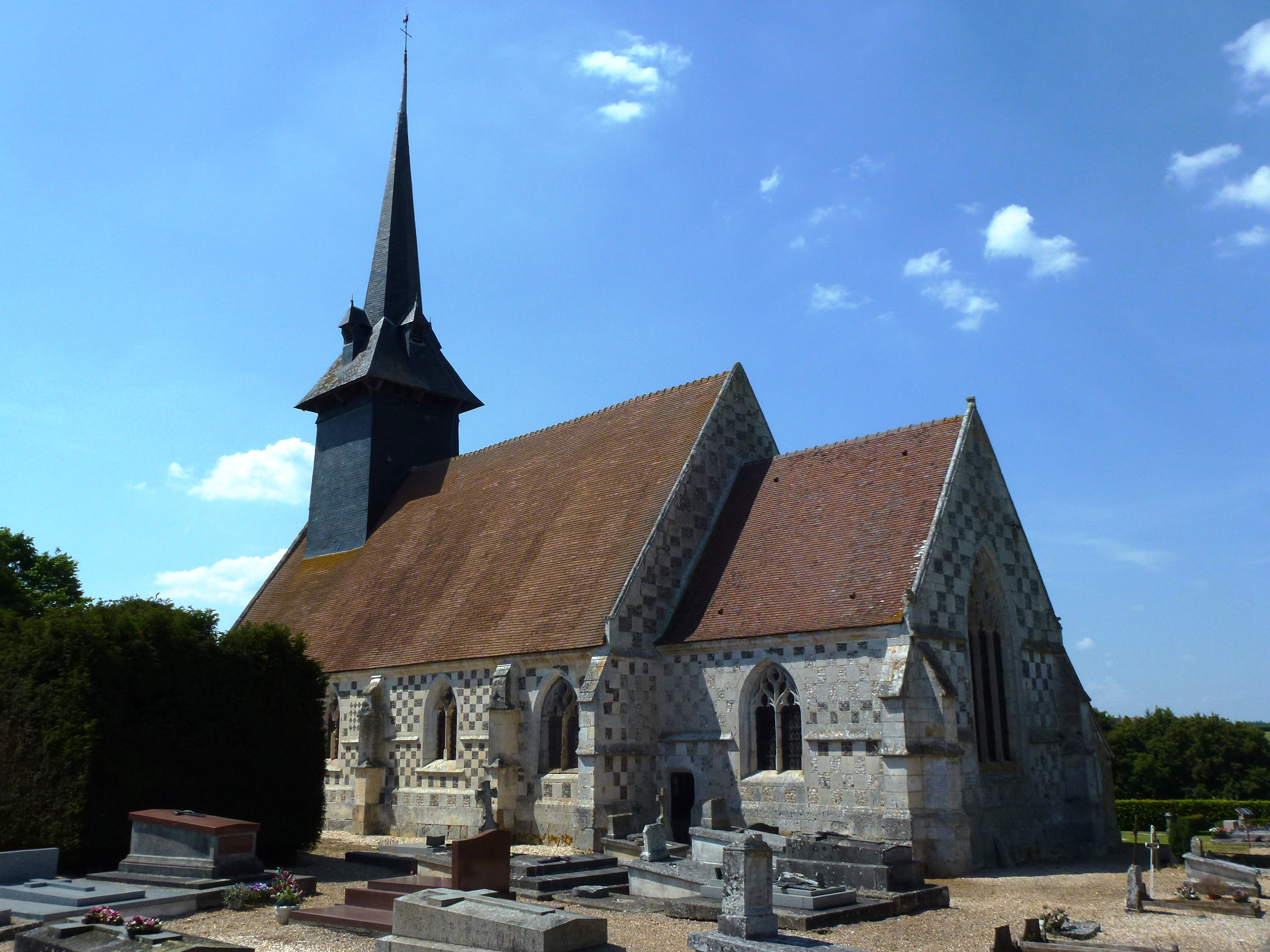
- The church in Sébécourt
- Location of Sébécourt
- Location within France Location within Normandy
- Coordinates: 48°58′20″N 0°50′18″E
- Country: France
- Region: Normandy
- Department: Eure
- Arrondissement: Évreux
- Canton: Conches-en-Ouche

Government
  - Mayor (2020–2026): Dany Bouvet
- Area^{1}: 14.8 km^{2} (5.7 sq mi)
- Elevation: 170 m (560 ft)
- Highest elevation: 178 m (584 ft)
- Lowest elevation: 130 m (430 ft)
- Population (2023): 461
  - Density: 31.1/km^{2} (80.7/sq mi)
- Time zone: UTC+01:00 (CET)
  - Summer (DST): UTC+02:00 (CEST)
- INSEE/Postal code: 27618 /27190
- ^{1} French Land Register data, which excludes lakes, ponds, glaciers > 1 km^{2} (0.386 sq mi or 247 acres) and river estuaries.

Sébécourt (French pronunciation: [sebekuʁ]) is a commune in the Eure department and Normandy region in northern France.

== Population ==
Historical population
Year	Pop.	±% p.a.
1968	224	—
1975	187	−2.55%
1982	219	+2.28%
1990	273	+2.79%
1999	315	+1.60%
2007	367	+1.93%
2012	458	+4.53%
2017	477	+0.82%
2023	461	−0.57%
Source: INSEE

== See also ==
- Communes of the Eure department
