= Nogent-le-Sec =

- Commune
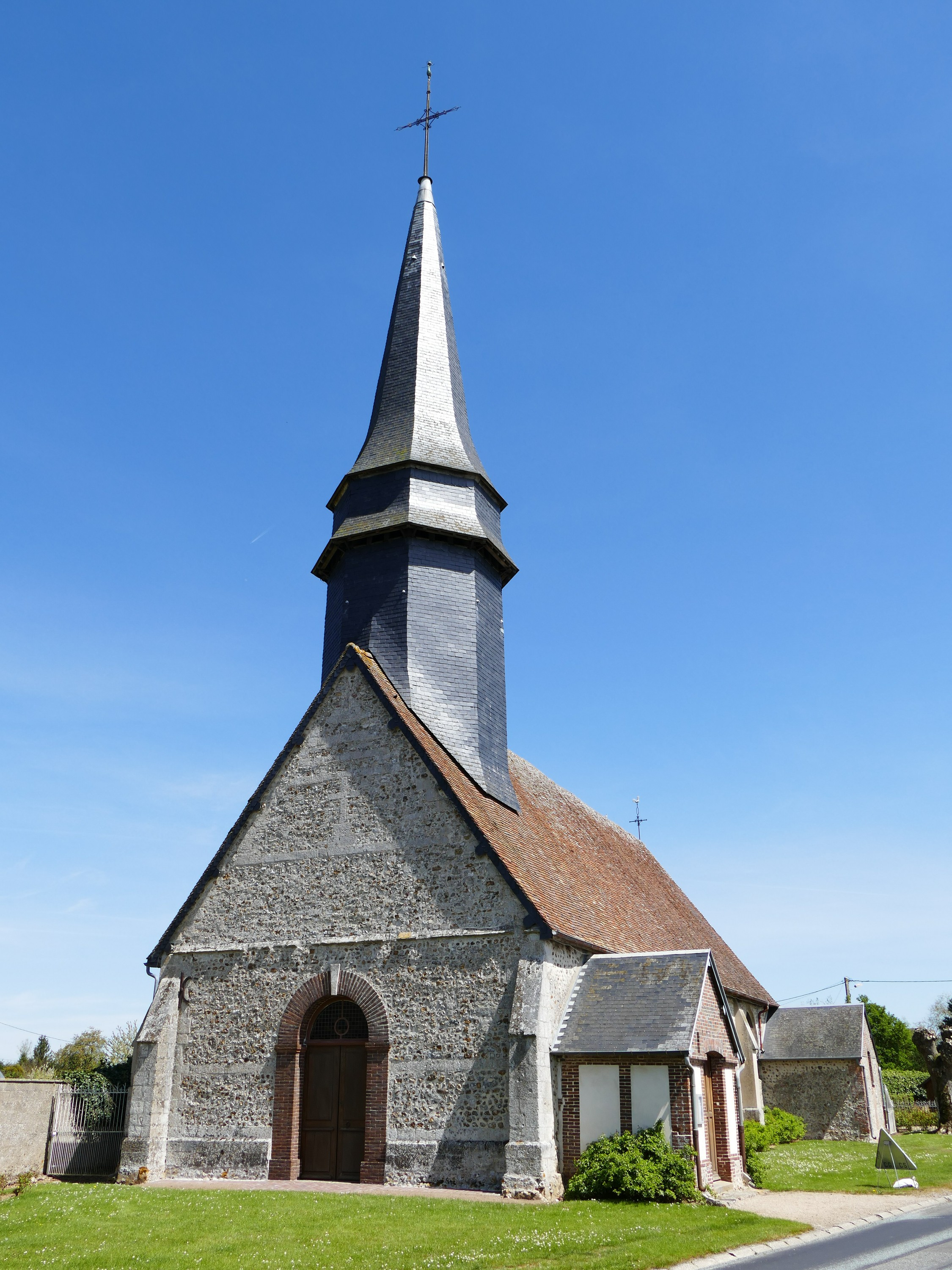
- The church in Nogent-le-Sec

- Coat of arms
- Location of Nogent-le-Sec
- Location within France Location within Normandy
- Coordinates: 48°55′21″N 1°00′13″E
- Country: France
- Region: Normandy
- Department: Eure
- Arrondissement: Évreux
- Canton: Conches-en-Ouche

Government
  - Mayor (2020–2026): Didier Bagot
- Area^{1}: 10.11 km^{2} (3.90 sq mi)
- Elevation: 173 m (568 ft)
- Highest elevation: 182 m (597 ft)
- Lowest elevation: 139 m (456 ft)
- Population (2023): 423
  - Density: 41.8/km^{2} (108/sq mi)
- Time zone: UTC+01:00 (CET)
  - Summer (DST): UTC+02:00 (CEST)
- INSEE/Postal code: 27436 /27190
- ^{1} French Land Register data, which excludes lakes, ponds, glaciers > 1 km^{2} (0.386 sq mi or 247 acres) and river estuaries.

Nogent-le-Sec is a commune in the Eure department in Normandy in northern France.

== Population ==
Historical population
Year	Pop.	±% p.a.
1968	255	—
1975	244	−0.63%
1982	304	+3.19%
1990	333	+1.15%
1999	340	+0.23%
2007	404	+2.18%
2012	400	−0.20%
2017	427	+1.31%
2023	423	−0.16%
Source: INSEE

== See also ==
- Communes of the Eure department
