= Gaudreville-la-Rivière =

- Commune
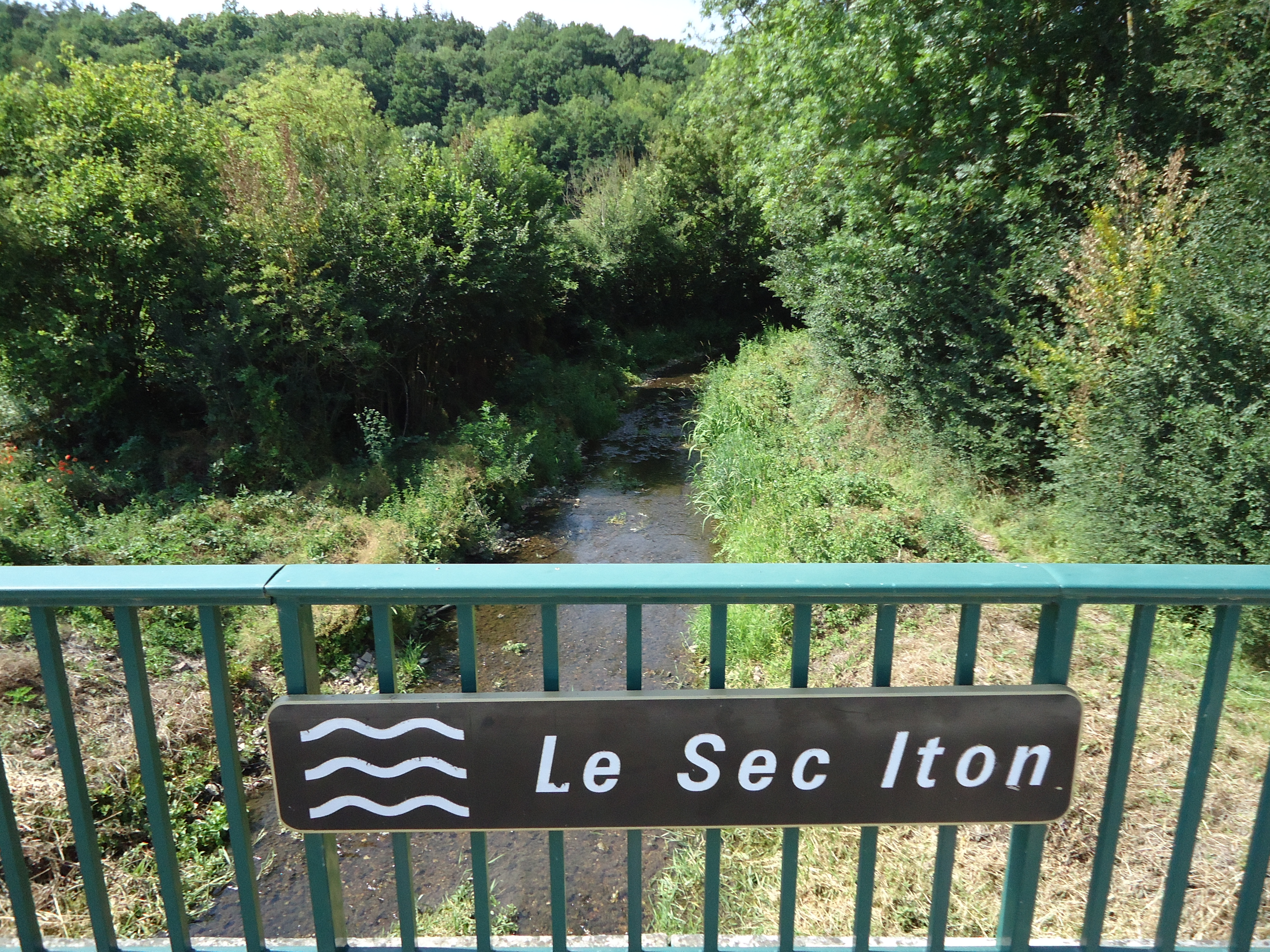
- The Sec-Iton at Gaudreville-la-Rivière
- Location of Gaudreville-la-Rivière
- Location within France Location within Normandy
- Coordinates: 48°58′06″N 1°01′51″E
- Country: France
- Region: Normandy
- Department: Eure
- Arrondissement: Évreux
- Canton: Conches-en-Ouche

Government
  - Mayor (2020–2026): Ghislain Homo
- Area^{1}: 6.73 km^{2} (2.60 sq mi)
- Elevation: 95 m (312 ft)
- Highest elevation: 153 m (502 ft)
- Lowest elevation: 87 m (285 ft)
- Population (2023): 234
  - Density: 34.8/km^{2} (90.1/sq mi)
- Time zone: UTC+01:00 (CET)
  - Summer (DST): UTC+02:00 (CEST)
- INSEE/Postal code: 27281 /27190
- ^{1} French Land Register data, which excludes lakes, ponds, glaciers > 1 km^{2} (0.386 sq mi or 247 acres) and river estuaries.

Gaudreville-la-Rivière (French pronunciation: [ɡodʁəvil la ʁivjɛʁ]) is a commune in the Eure department in northern France.

== Population ==
Historical population
Year	Pop.	±% p.a.
1968	98	—
1975	108	+1.40%
1982	160	+5.78%
1990	208	+3.33%
1999	219	+0.57%
2007	234	+0.83%
2012	233	−0.09%
2017	227	−0.52%
2023	234	+0.51%
Source: INSEE

== See also ==
- Communes of the Eure department
