= Le Val-Doré =

- Commune
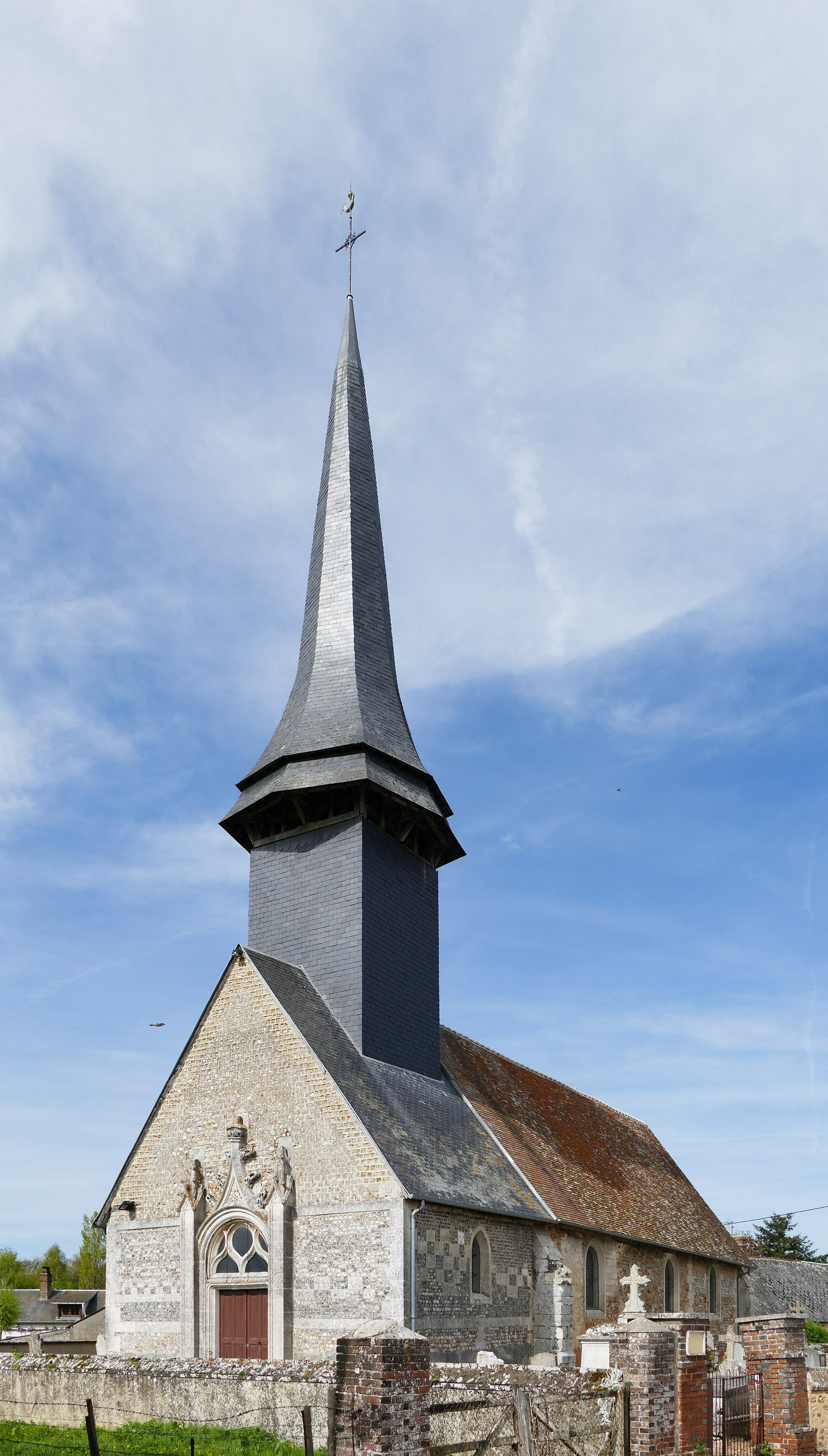
- The church of Our Lady in Orvaux
- Location of Le Val-Doré
- Location within France Location within Normandy
- Coordinates: 48°56′24″N 1°02′03″E
- Country: France
- Region: Normandy
- Department: Eure
- Arrondissement: Évreux
- Canton: Conches-en-Ouche
- Intercommunality: Pays de Conches

Government
  - Mayor (2020–2026): Jeannick Lapeyronnie
- Area^{1}: 20.17 km^{2} (7.79 sq mi)
- Population (2023): 890
  - Density: 44/km^{2} (110/sq mi)
- Time zone: UTC+01:00 (CET)
  - Summer (DST): UTC+02:00 (CEST)
- INSEE/Postal code: 27447 /27190
- ^{1} French Land Register data, which excludes lakes, ponds, glaciers > 1 km^{2} (0.386 sq mi or 247 acres) and river estuaries.

Le Val-Doré (French pronunciation: [lə val dɔʁe]) is a commune in the department of Eure, northern France. The municipality was established on 1 January 2018 by merger of the former communes of Orvaux (the seat), Le Fresne and Le Mesnil-Hardray.

== See also ==
- Communes of the Eure department
