= Arnières-sur-Iton =

- Commune
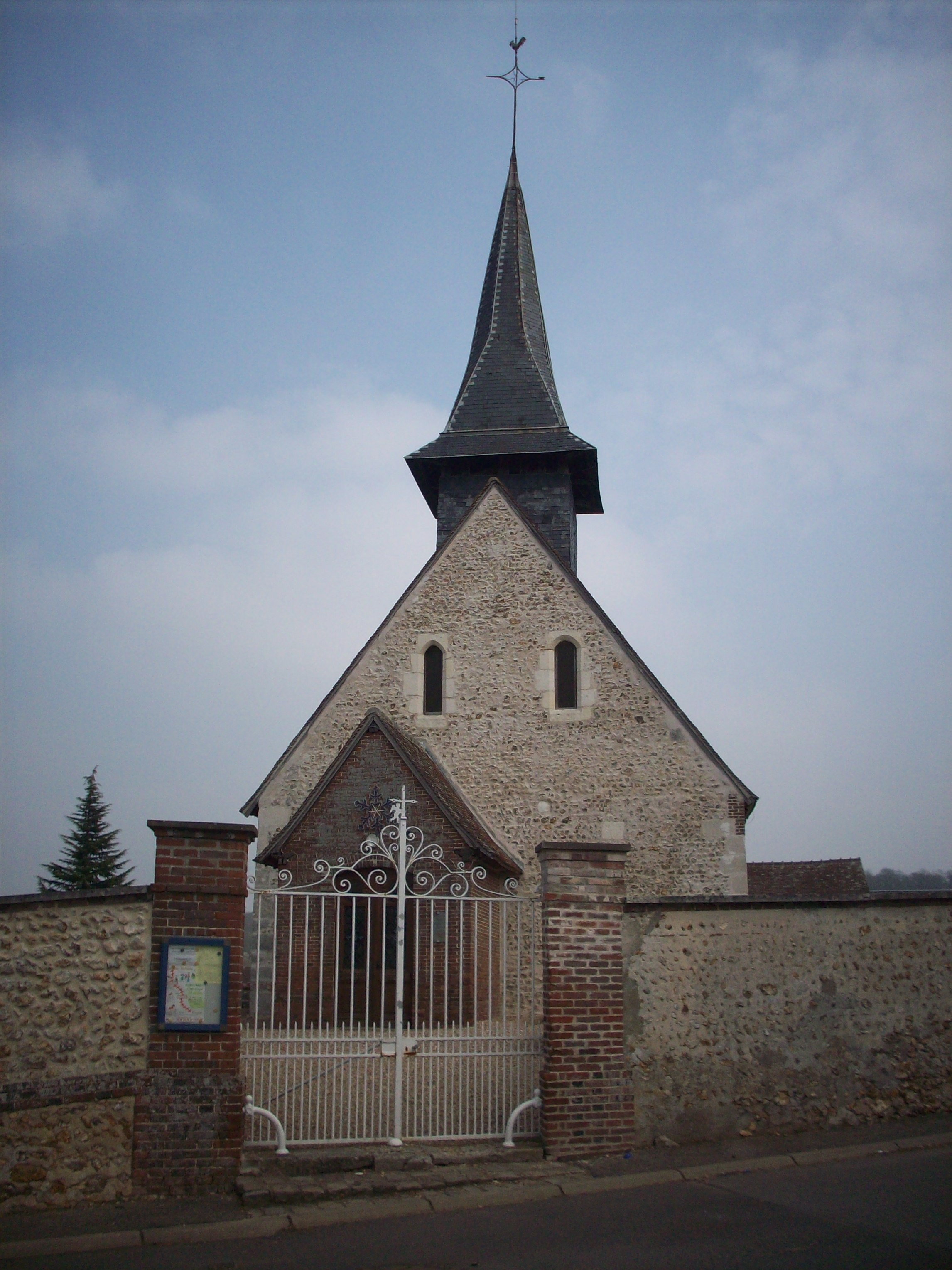
- The church in Arnières-sur-Iton
- Location of Arnières-sur-Iton
- Location within France Location within Normandy
- Coordinates: 48°59′49″N 1°06′18″E
- Country: France
- Region: Normandy
- Department: Eure
- Arrondissement: Évreux
- Canton: Évreux-1
- Intercommunality: Évreux Portes Normandie

Government
  - Mayor (2020–2026): Alain Comont
- Area^{1}: 12.19 km^{2} (4.71 sq mi)
- Elevation: 80 m (260 ft)
- Highest elevation: 150 m (490 ft)
- Lowest elevation: 66 m (217 ft)
- Population (2023): 1,643
  - Density: 134.8/km^{2} (349.1/sq mi)
- Time zone: UTC+01:00 (CET)
  - Summer (DST): UTC+02:00 (CEST)
- INSEE/Postal code: 27020 /27180
- ^{1} French Land Register data, which excludes lakes, ponds, glaciers > 1 km^{2} (0.386 sq mi or 247 acres) and river estuaries.

Arnières-sur-Iton (French pronunciation: [aʁnjɛʁ syʁ itɔ̃], literally Arnières on Iton) is a commune in the Eure department in Normandy in northern France.

== Population ==
Historical population
Year	Pop.	±% p.a.
1968	1,132	—
1975	1,209	+0.94%
1982	1,443	+2.56%
1990	1,571	+1.07%
1999	1,500	−0.51%
2007	1,647	+1.18%
2012	1,571	−0.94%
2017	1,682	+1.37%
2023	1,643	−0.39%
Source: INSEE

== See also ==
- Communes of the Eure department
