= Louversey =

- Commune
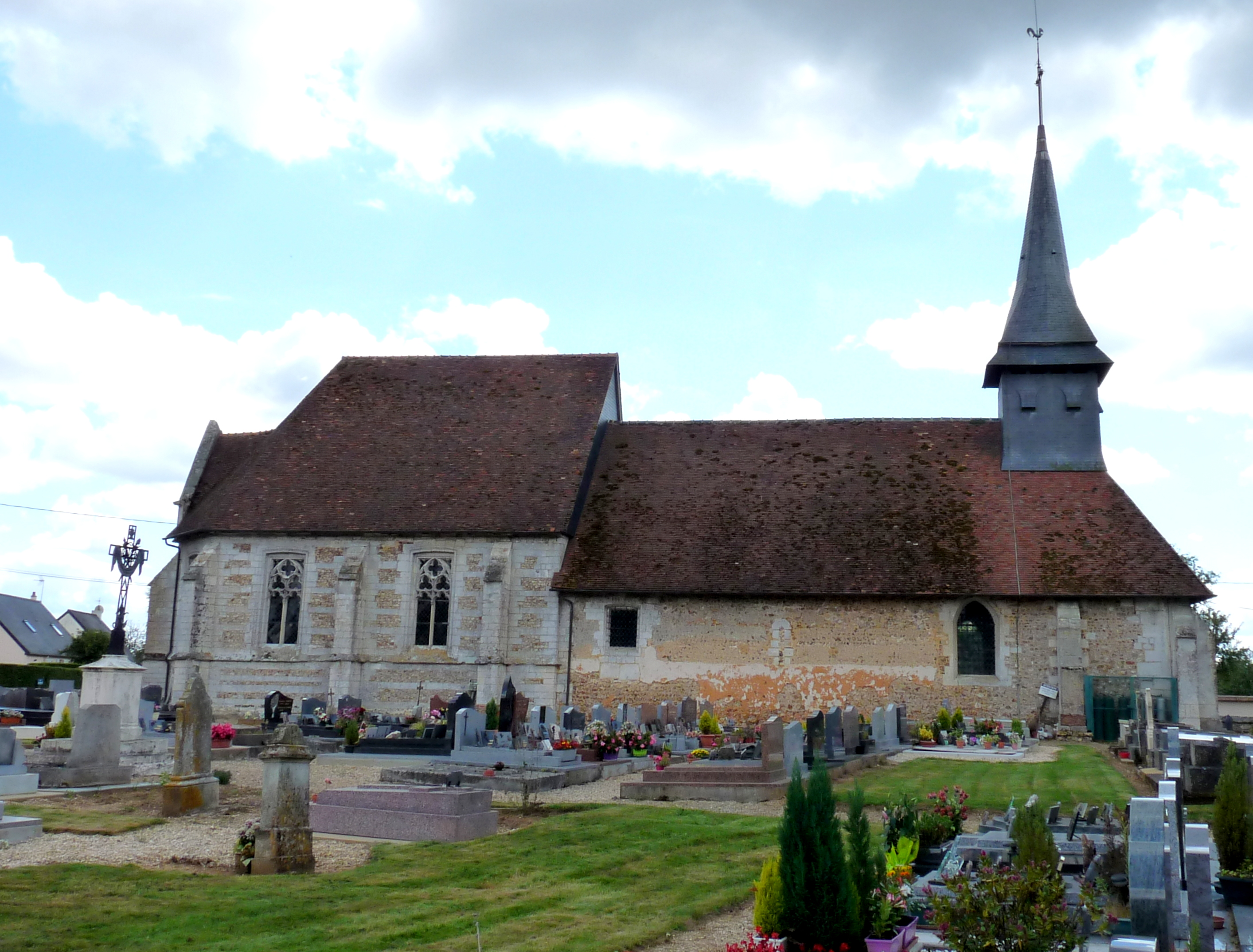
- The church of Saint Martin in Louversey
- Location of Louversey
- Location within France Location within Normandy
- Coordinates: 48°59′28″N 0°55′16″E
- Country: France
- Region: Normandy
- Department: Eure
- Arrondissement: Évreux
- Canton: Conches-en-Ouche

Government
  - Mayor (2020–2026): Christophe Capelle
- Area^{1}: 10.73 km^{2} (4.14 sq mi)
- Elevation: 157 m (515 ft)
- Highest elevation: 161 m (528 ft)
- Lowest elevation: 120 m (390 ft)
- Population (2023): 497
  - Density: 46.3/km^{2} (120/sq mi)
- Time zone: UTC+01:00 (CET)
  - Summer (DST): UTC+02:00 (CEST)
- INSEE/Postal code: 27374 /27190
- ^{1} French Land Register data, which excludes lakes, ponds, glaciers > 1 km^{2} (0.386 sq mi or 247 acres) and river estuaries.

Louversey (French pronunciation: [luvɛʁsɛ]) is a commune in the Eure department in Normandy in northern France.

== Population ==
Historical population
Year	Pop.	±% p.a.
1968	352	—
1975	390	+1.48%
1982	417	+0.96%
1990	479	+1.75%
1999	492	+0.30%
2007	597	+2.45%
2012	571	−0.89%
2017	538	−1.18%
2023	497	−1.31%
Source: INSEE

== See also ==
- Communes of the Eure department
