= Aulnay-sur-Iton =

- Commune
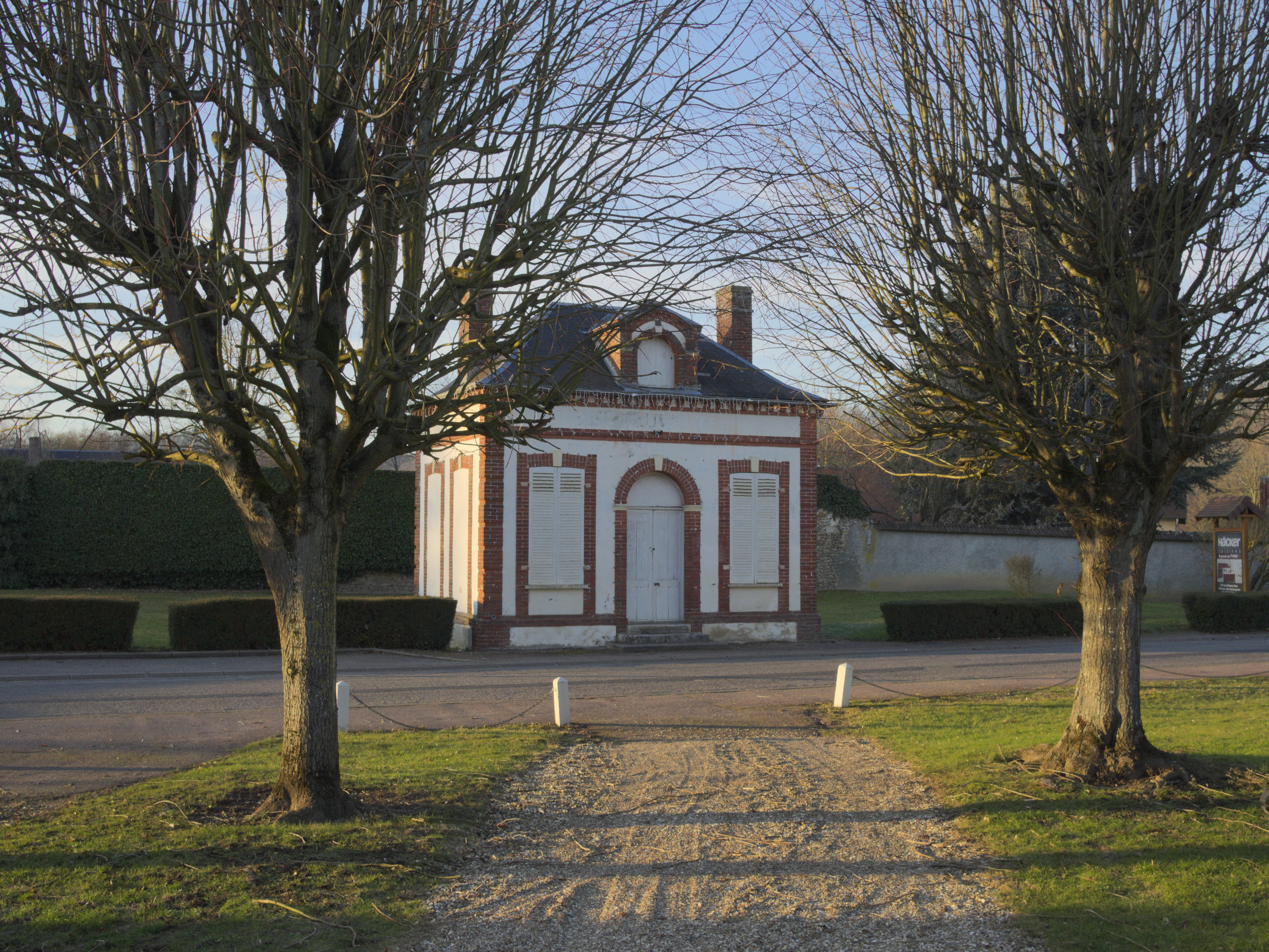
- The old town hall in Aulnay-sur-Iton

- Coat of arms
- Location of Aulnay-sur-Iton
- Location within France Location within Normandy
- Coordinates: 48°59′52″N 1°03′46″E
- Country: France
- Region: Normandy
- Department: Eure
- Arrondissement: Évreux
- Canton: Conches-en-Ouche
- Intercommunality: CC Pays de Conches

Government
  - Mayor (2020–2026): Danielle Jeanne
- Area^{1}: 1.53 km^{2} (0.59 sq mi)
- Elevation: 81 m (266 ft)
- Highest elevation: 130 m (430 ft)
- Lowest elevation: 76 m (249 ft)
- Population (2023): 710
  - Density: 460/km^{2} (1,200/sq mi)
- Time zone: UTC+01:00 (CET)
  - Summer (DST): UTC+02:00 (CEST)
- INSEE/Postal code: 27023 /27180
- ^{1} French Land Register data, which excludes lakes, ponds, glaciers > 1 km^{2} (0.386 sq mi or 247 acres) and river estuaries.

Aulnay-sur-Iton (French pronunciation: [onɛ syʁ itɔ̃], literally Aulnay on Iton) is a commune in the Eure department in Normandy in northern France.

== Population ==
Historical population
Year	Pop.	±% p.a.
1968	425	—
1975	482	+1.81%
1982	529	+1.34%
1990	544	+0.35%
1999	590	+0.91%
2007	669	+1.58%
2012	733	+1.84%
2017	709	−0.66%
2023	710	+0.02%
Source: INSEE

== See also ==
- Communes of the Eure department
