= Crulai =

- Commune
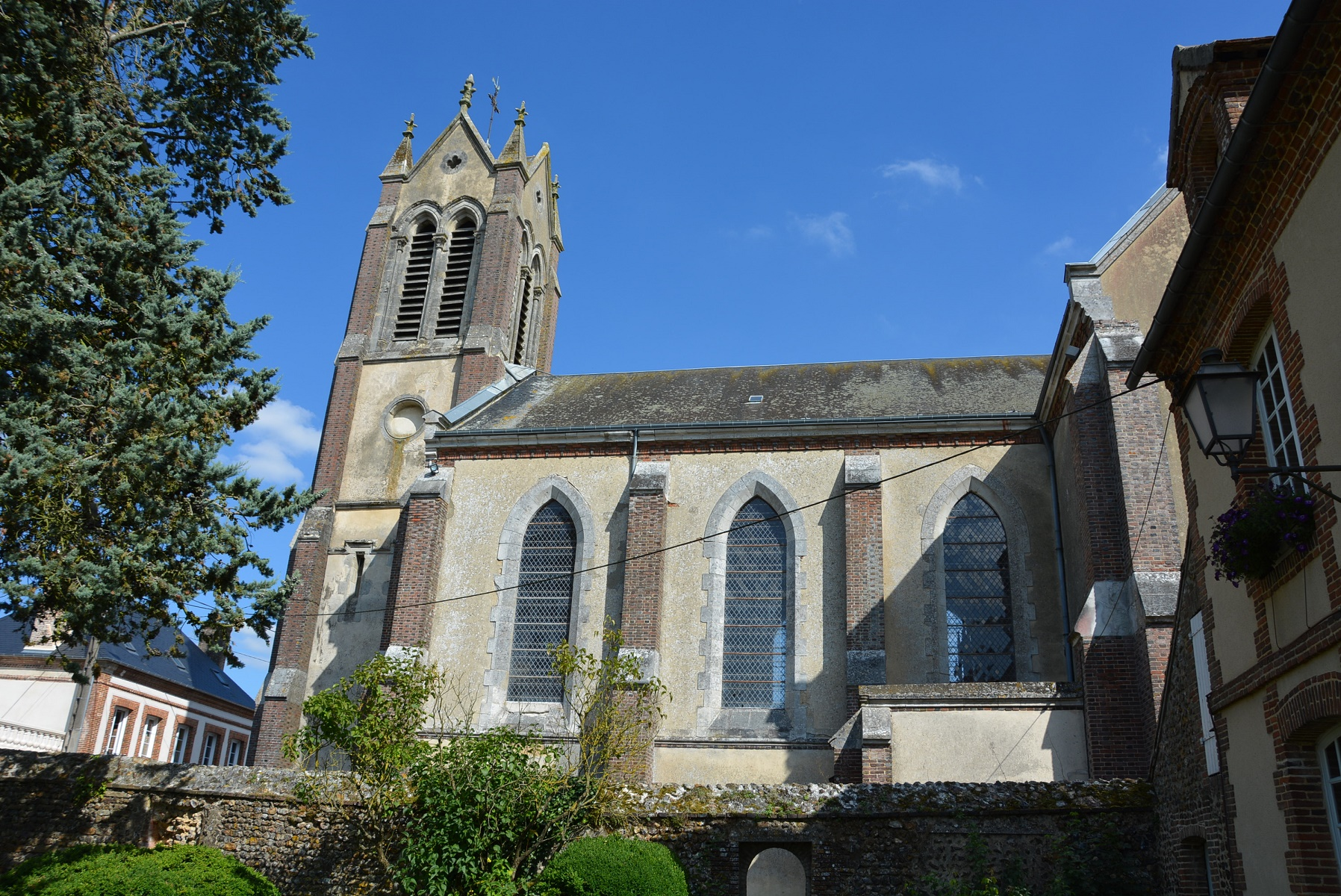

- Coat of arms
- Location of Crulai
- Location within France Location within Normandy
- Coordinates: 48°42′19″N 0°40′03″E
- Country: France
- Region: Normandy
- Department: Orne
- Arrondissement: Mortagne-au-Perche
- Canton: Tourouvre au Perche
- Intercommunality: CC du Pays de l'Aigle

Government
  - Mayor (2020–2026): Philippe Croteau
- Area^{1}: 22.50 km^{2} (8.69 sq mi)
- Elevation: 230 m (750 ft)
- Highest elevation: 264 m (866 ft)
- Lowest elevation: 204 m (669 ft)
- Population (2023): 797
  - Density: 35.4/km^{2} (91.7/sq mi)
- Time zone: UTC+01:00 (CET)
  - Summer (DST): UTC+02:00 (CEST)
- INSEE/Postal code: 61140 /61300
- ^{1} French Land Register data, which excludes lakes, ponds, glaciers > 1 km^{2} (0.386 sq mi or 247 acres) and river estuaries.

Crulai (French pronunciation: [kʁylɛ]) is a commune in the Orne department in north-western France.

== Geography ==
The commune is made up of the following collection of villages and hamlets, La Repesserie, La Blondelière, Coupey, Crulai, La Bourdinière, Le Binai and La Julannière.

The Commune along with another 70 communes shares part of a 47,681 hectare, Natura 2000 conservation area, called the Forêts et étangs du Perche.

A river, the Iton flows through the commune.

== Points of interest ==
=== National heritage sites ===
- Cornillère Farm a nineteenth century model farm, that was registered as a Monument historique 2006.

== See also ==
- Communes of the Orne department
