= Gauville-la-Campagne =

- Commune
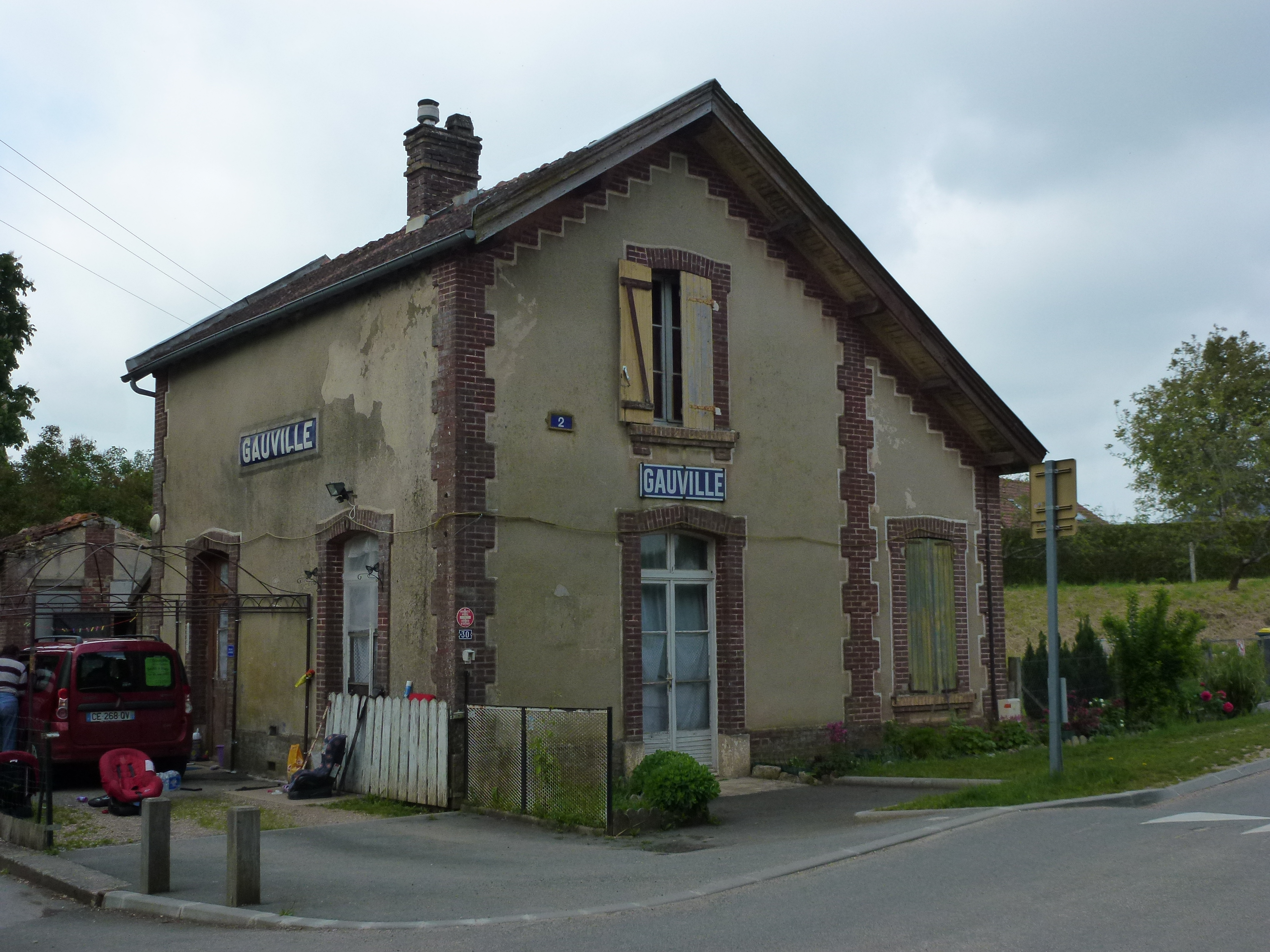
- Former train station

- Coat of arms
- Location of Gauville-la-Campagne
- Location within France Location within Normandy
- Coordinates: 49°02′56″N 1°05′14″E
- Country: France
- Region: Normandy
- Department: Eure
- Arrondissement: Évreux
- Canton: Conches-en-Ouche
- Intercommunality: CA Évreux Portes de Normandie

Government
  - Mayor (2020–2026): Françoise Canel
- Area^{1}: 6.15 km^{2} (2.37 sq mi)
- Elevation: 139 m (456 ft)
- Highest elevation: 146 m (479 ft)
- Lowest elevation: 107 m (351 ft)
- Population (2023): 652
  - Density: 106/km^{2} (275/sq mi)
- Time zone: UTC+01:00 (CET)
  - Summer (DST): UTC+02:00 (CEST)
- INSEE/Postal code: 27282 /27930
- ^{1} French Land Register data, which excludes lakes, ponds, glaciers > 1 km^{2} (0.386 sq mi or 247 acres) and river estuaries.

Gauville-la-Campagne (French pronunciation: [ɡovil la kɑ̃paɲ]) is a commune in the Eure department in northern France.

== Population ==
Historical population
Year	Pop.	±% p.a.
1968	194	—
1975	275	+5.11%
1982	431	+6.63%
1990	544	+2.95%
1999	537	−0.14%
2007	513	−0.57%
2012	506	−0.27%
2017	578	+2.70%
2023	652	+2.03%
Source: INSEE

== See also ==
- Communes of the Eure department
