= Ferrières-Haut-Clocher =

- Commune
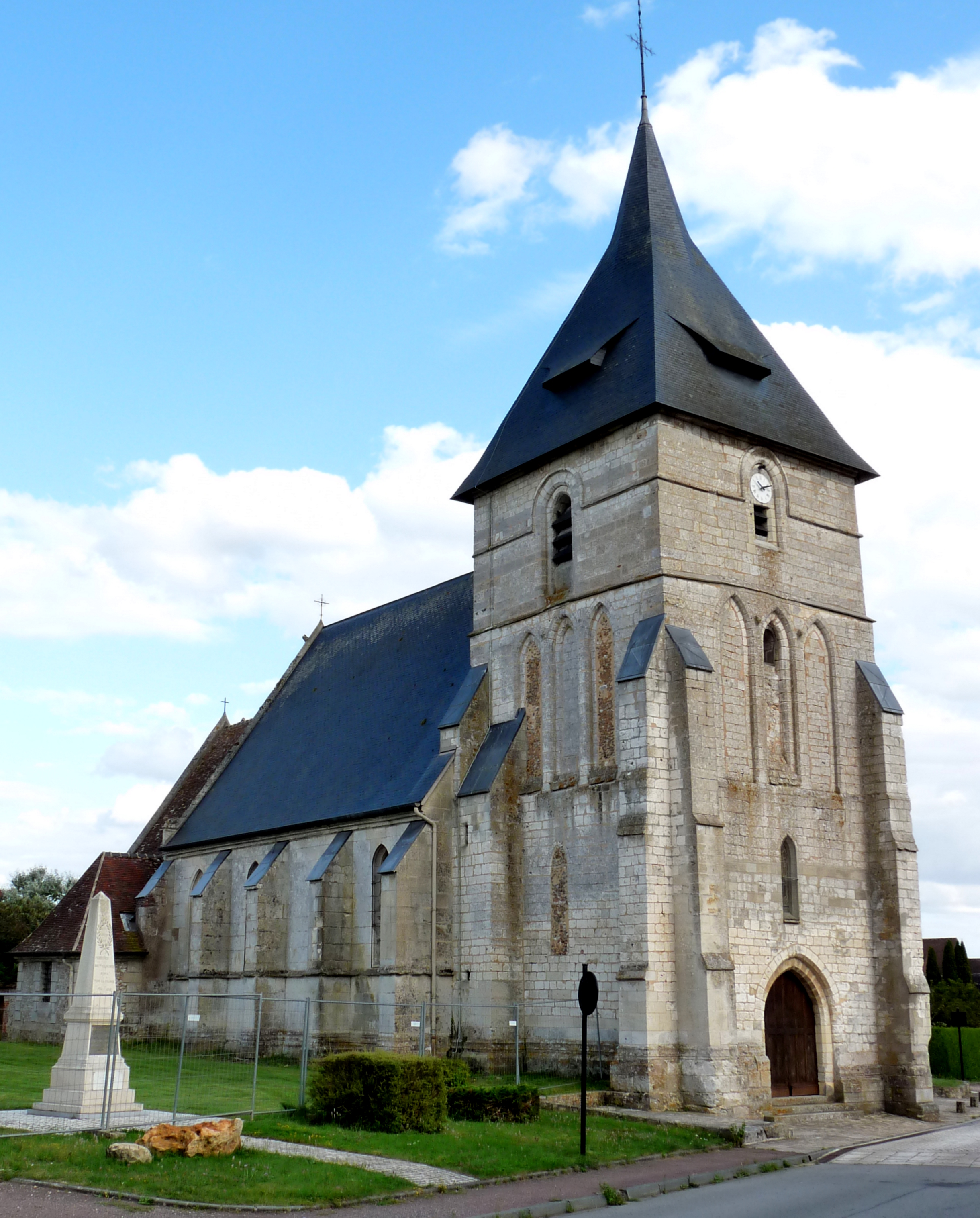
- The church in Ferrières-Haut-Clocher

- Coat of arms
- Location of Ferrières-Haut-Clocher
- Location within France Location within Normandy
- Coordinates: 49°01′20″N 0°58′54″E
- Country: France
- Region: Normandy
- Department: Eure
- Arrondissement: Évreux
- Canton: Conches-en-Ouche

Government
  - Mayor (2024–2026): Sophie Jehenne
- Area^{1}: 11.38 km^{2} (4.39 sq mi)
- Elevation: 134 m (440 ft)
- Highest elevation: 149 m (489 ft)
- Lowest elevation: 120 m (390 ft)
- Population (2023): 1,097
  - Density: 96.40/km^{2} (249.7/sq mi)
- Time zone: UTC+01:00 (CET)
  - Summer (DST): UTC+02:00 (CEST)
- INSEE/Postal code: 27238 /27190
- ^{1} French Land Register data, which excludes lakes, ponds, glaciers > 1 km^{2} (0.386 sq mi or 247 acres) and river estuaries.

Ferrières-Haut-Clocher (French pronunciation: [fɛʁjɛʁ o klɔʃe]) is a commune in the Eure department in the Normandy region in northern France.

== Population ==
Historical population
Year	Pop.	±% p.a.
1968	235	—
1975	223	−0.75%
1982	391	+8.35%
1990	569	+4.80%
1999	760	+3.27%
2007	1,030	+3.87%
2012	1,185	+2.84%
2017	1,166	−0.32%
2023	1,097	−1.01%
Source: INSEE

== See also ==
- Communes of the Eure department
