= Beaubray =

- Commune
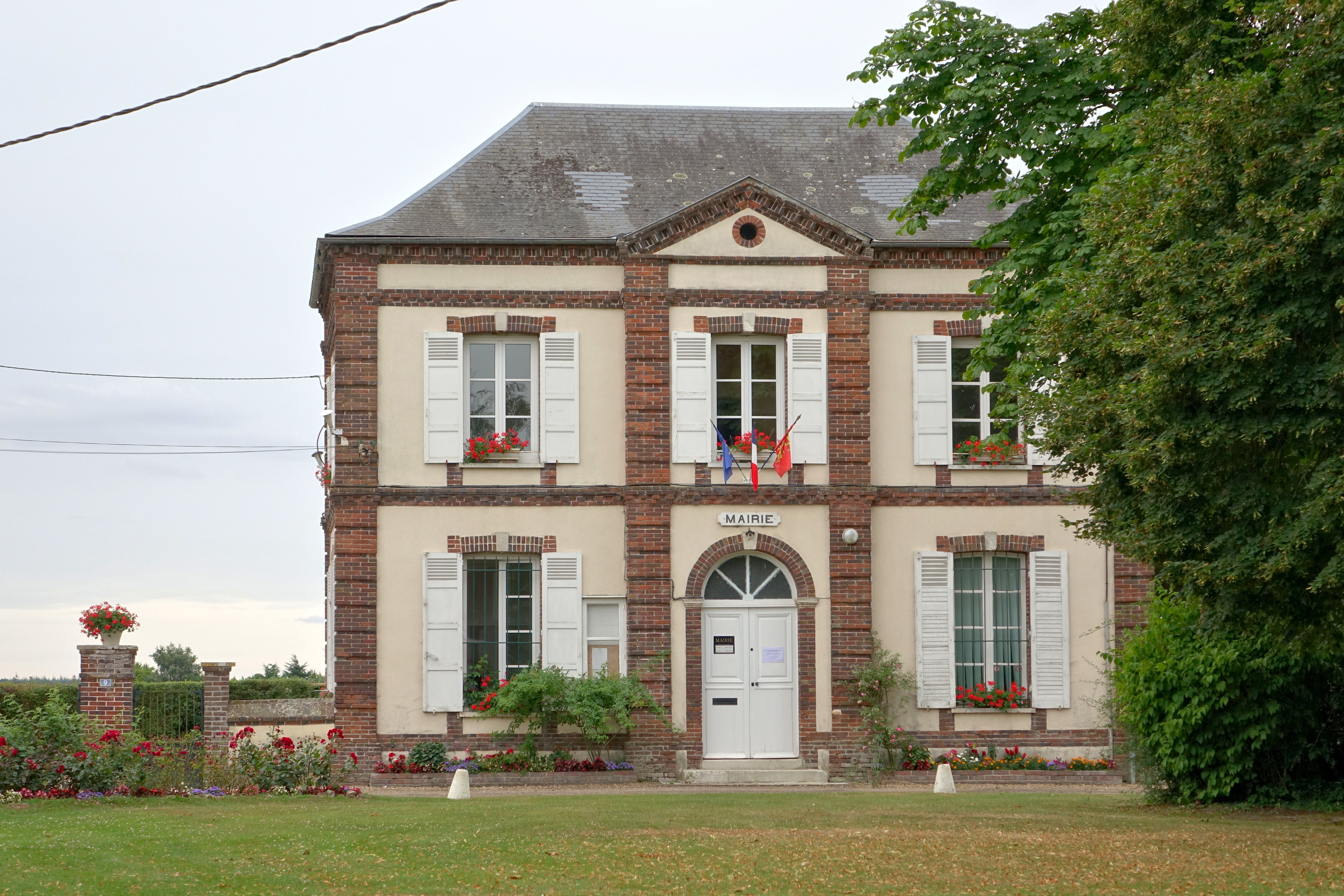
- The town hall in Beaubray
- Location of Beaubray
- Location within France Location within Normandy
- Coordinates: 48°54′47″N 0°54′48″E
- Country: France
- Region: Normandy
- Department: Eure
- Arrondissement: Évreux
- Canton: Conches-en-Ouche
- Intercommunality: Pays de Conches

Government
  - Mayor (2020–2026): Denis Cavelier
- Area^{1}: 15.43 km^{2} (5.96 sq mi)
- Elevation: 175 m (574 ft)
- Highest elevation: 192 m (630 ft)
- Lowest elevation: 127 m (417 ft)
- Population (2023): 335
  - Density: 21.7/km^{2} (56.2/sq mi)
- Time zone: UTC+01:00 (CET)
  - Summer (DST): UTC+02:00 (CEST)
- INSEE/Postal code: 27047 /27190
- ^{1} French Land Register data, which excludes lakes, ponds, glaciers > 1 km^{2} (0.386 sq mi or 247 acres) and river estuaries.

Beaubray (French pronunciation: [bobʁɛ]) is a commune in the Eure department in Normandy in northern France.

== Population ==
Historical population
Year	Pop.	±% p.a.
1968	227	—
1975	252	+1.50%
1982	222	−1.79%
1990	254	+1.70%
1999	266	+0.51%
2007	276	+0.46%
2012	303	+1.88%
2017	318	+0.97%
2023	335	+0.87%
Source: INSEE

== See also ==
- Communes of the Eure department
