= Sainte-Marthe, Eure =

Sainte-Marthe
- Commune
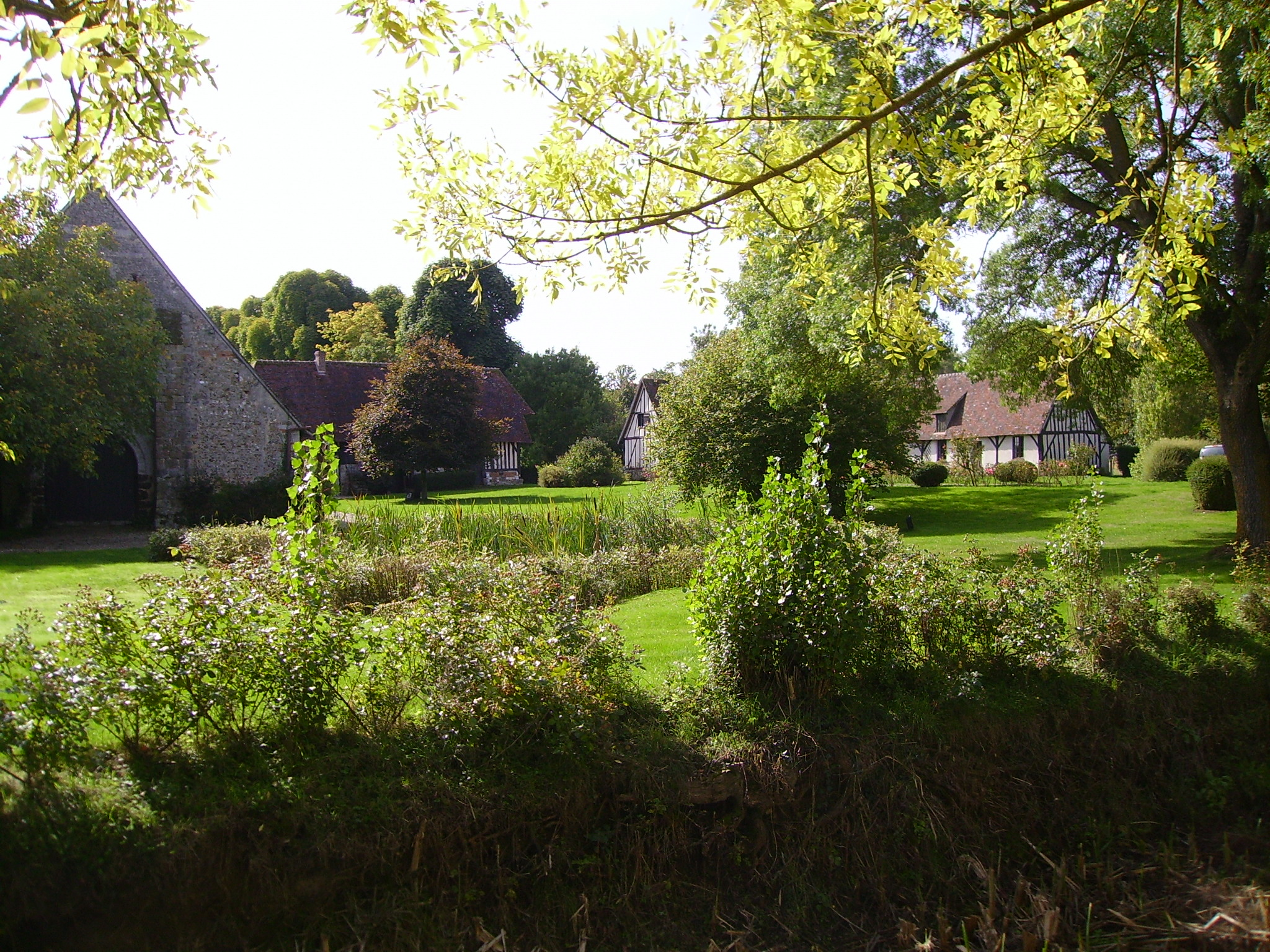
- The manor of Pommereuil, in Sainte-Marthe
- Location of Sainte-Marthe
- Location within France Location within Normandy
- Coordinates: 48°58′06″N 0°52′56″E
- Country: France
- Region: Normandy
- Department: Eure
- Arrondissement: Évreux
- Canton: Conches-en-Ouche

Government
  - Mayor (2020–2026): Max Rongrais
- Area^{1}: 17.5 km^{2} (6.8 sq mi)
- Elevation: 143 m (469 ft)
- Highest elevation: 182 m (597 ft)
- Lowest elevation: 125 m (410 ft)
- Population (2023): 501
  - Density: 28.6/km^{2} (74.1/sq mi)
- Time zone: UTC+01:00 (CET)
  - Summer (DST): UTC+02:00 (CEST)
- INSEE/Postal code: 27568 /27190
- ^{1} French Land Register data, which excludes lakes, ponds, glaciers > 1 km^{2} (0.386 sq mi or 247 acres) and river estuaries.

Sainte-Marthe is a commune in the Eure department in Normandy in northern France.

== Population ==
Historical population
Year	Pop.	±% p.a.
1968	261	—
1975	235	−1.49%
1982	293	+3.20%
1990	377	+3.20%
1999	425	+1.34%
2007	460	+0.99%
2012	461	+0.04%
2017	508	+1.96%
2023	501	−0.23%
Source: INSEE

== See also ==
- Communes of the Eure department
