= Ormes, Eure =

Ormes
- Commune
- Location of Ormes
- Location within France Location within Normandy
- Coordinates: 49°03′10″N 0°57′51″E
- Country: France
- Region: Normandy
- Department: Eure
- Arrondissement: Évreux
- Canton: Conches-en-Ouche

Government
  - Mayor (2020–2026): Jacques Fauvel
- Area^{1}: 14.1 km^{2} (5.4 sq mi)
- Elevation: 149 m (489 ft)
- Highest elevation: 156 m (512 ft)
- Lowest elevation: 136 m (446 ft)
- Population (2023): 451
  - Density: 32.0/km^{2} (82.8/sq mi)
- Time zone: UTC+01:00 (CET)
  - Summer (DST): UTC+02:00 (CEST)
- INSEE/Postal code: 27446 /27190
- ^{1} French Land Register data, which excludes lakes, ponds, glaciers > 1 km^{2} (0.386 sq mi or 247 acres) and river estuaries.

Ormes (French pronunciation: [ɔʁm]) is a commune in the Eure department in Normandy in northern France.

== Population ==
Historical population
Year	Pop.	±% p.a.
1968	255	—
1975	293	+2.00%
1982	309	+0.76%
1990	389	+2.92%
1999	383	−0.17%
2007	444	+1.86%
2012	492	+2.07%
2017	489	−0.12%
2023	451	−1.34%
Source: INSEE

== See also ==
- Communes of the Eure department
