= Nagel-Séez-Mesnil =

- Commune
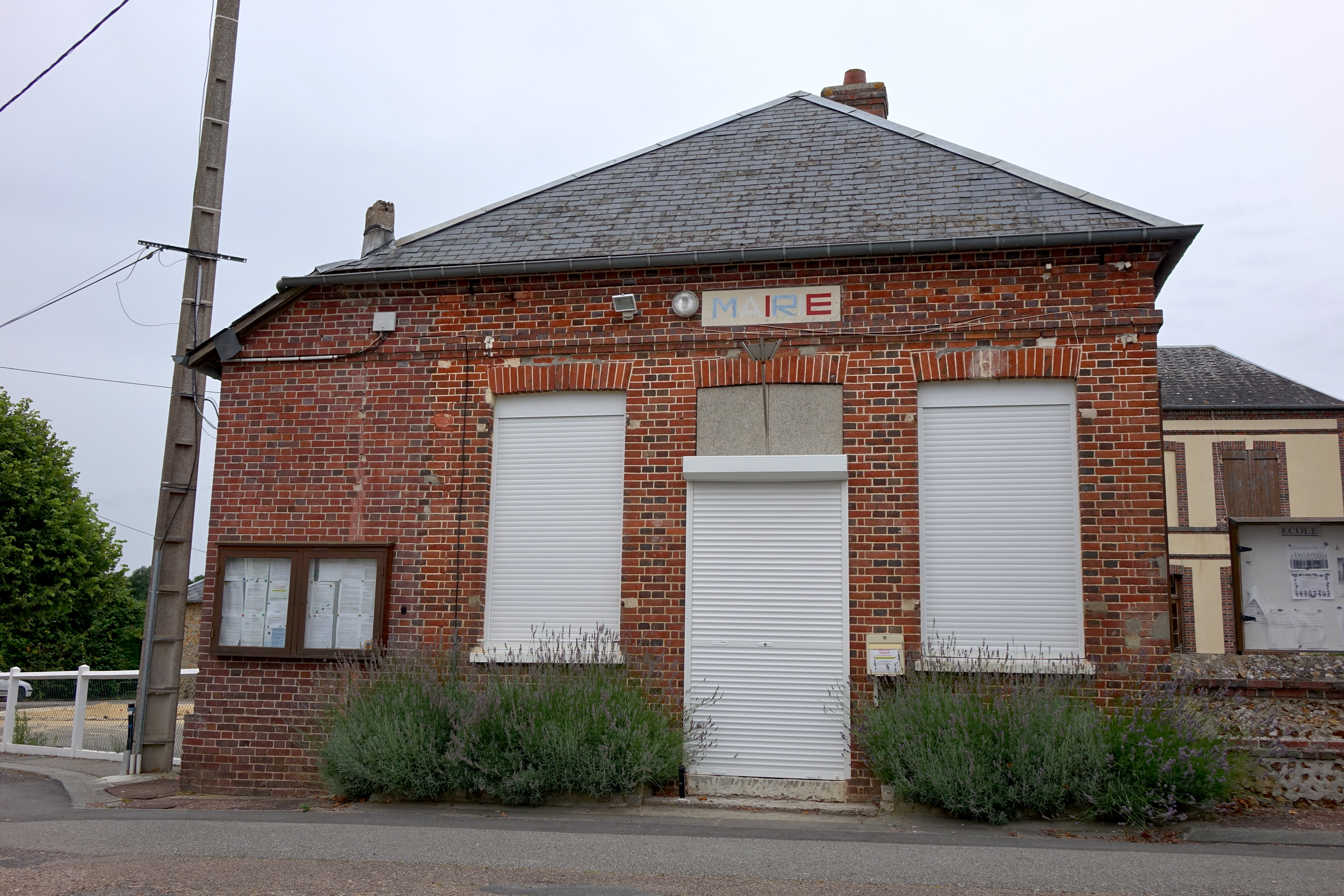
- The town hall in Nagel-Séez-Mesnil
- Location of Nagel-Séez-Mesnil
- Location within France Location within Normandy
- Coordinates: 48°55′28″N 0°56′12″E
- Country: France
- Region: Normandy
- Department: Eure
- Arrondissement: Évreux
- Canton: Conches-en-Ouche
- Intercommunality: Pays de Conches

Government
  - Mayor (2020–2026): Thierry Lothon
- Area^{1}: 11.72 km^{2} (4.53 sq mi)
- Elevation: 172 m (564 ft)
- Highest elevation: 179 m (587 ft)
- Lowest elevation: 156 m (512 ft)
- Population (2023): 330
  - Density: 28/km^{2} (73/sq mi)
- Time zone: UTC+01:00 (CET)
  - Summer (DST): UTC+02:00 (CEST)
- INSEE/Postal code: 27424 /27190
- ^{1} French Land Register data, which excludes lakes, ponds, glaciers > 1 km^{2} (0.386 sq mi or 247 acres) and river estuaries.

Nagel-Séez-Mesnil (French pronunciation: [naʒɛl se mɛnil]) is a commune in the Eure department in Normandy in northern France.

== Population ==
Historical population
Year	Pop.	±% p.a.
1968	246	—
1975	262	+0.90%
1982	293	+1.61%
1990	326	+1.34%
1999	304	−0.77%
2007	329	+0.99%
2012	329	+0.00%
2017	327	−0.12%
2023	330	+0.15%
Source: INSEE

== See also ==
- Communes of the Eure department
