= Parville =

- Commune
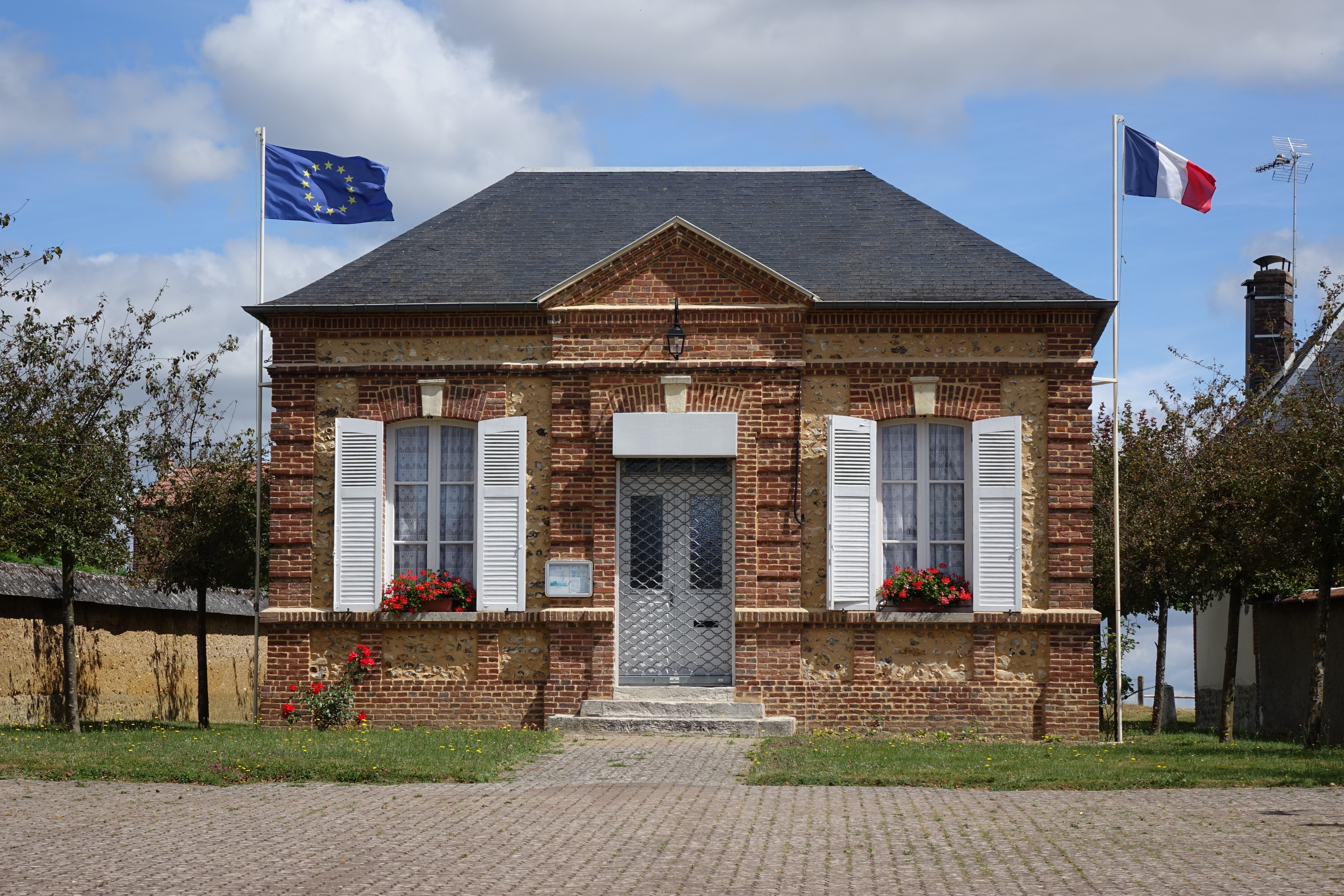
- The town hall in Parville
- Location of Parville
- Location within France Location within Normandy
- Coordinates: 49°02′03″N 1°05′43″E
- Country: France
- Region: Normandy
- Department: Eure
- Arrondissement: Évreux
- Canton: Conches-en-Ouche
- Intercommunality: CA Évreux Portes de Normandie

Government
  - Mayor (2020–2026): Georges Senkewitch
- Area^{1}: 4.54 km^{2} (1.75 sq mi)
- Elevation: 130 m (430 ft)
- Highest elevation: 141 m (463 ft)
- Lowest elevation: 80 m (260 ft)
- Population (2023): 298
  - Density: 65.6/km^{2} (170/sq mi)
- Time zone: UTC+01:00 (CET)
  - Summer (DST): UTC+02:00 (CEST)
- INSEE/Postal code: 27451 /27180
- ^{1} French Land Register data, which excludes lakes, ponds, glaciers > 1 km^{2} (0.386 sq mi or 247 acres) and river estuaries.

Parville (French pronunciation: [paʁvil]) is a commune in the Eure department in Normandy in northern France. It is 4.6 kilometres (2.9 mi) west of Evreux, close to the Golf d'Evreux golf course.

== Population ==
Historical population
Year	Pop.	±% p.a.
1968	212	—
1975	244	+2.03%
1982	311	+3.53%
1990	340	+1.12%
1999	320	−0.67%
2007	286	−1.39%
2012	286	+0.00%
2017	308	+1.49%
2023	298	−0.55%
Source: INSEE

== See also ==
- Communes of the Eure department
