= La Bonneville-sur-Iton =

- Commune
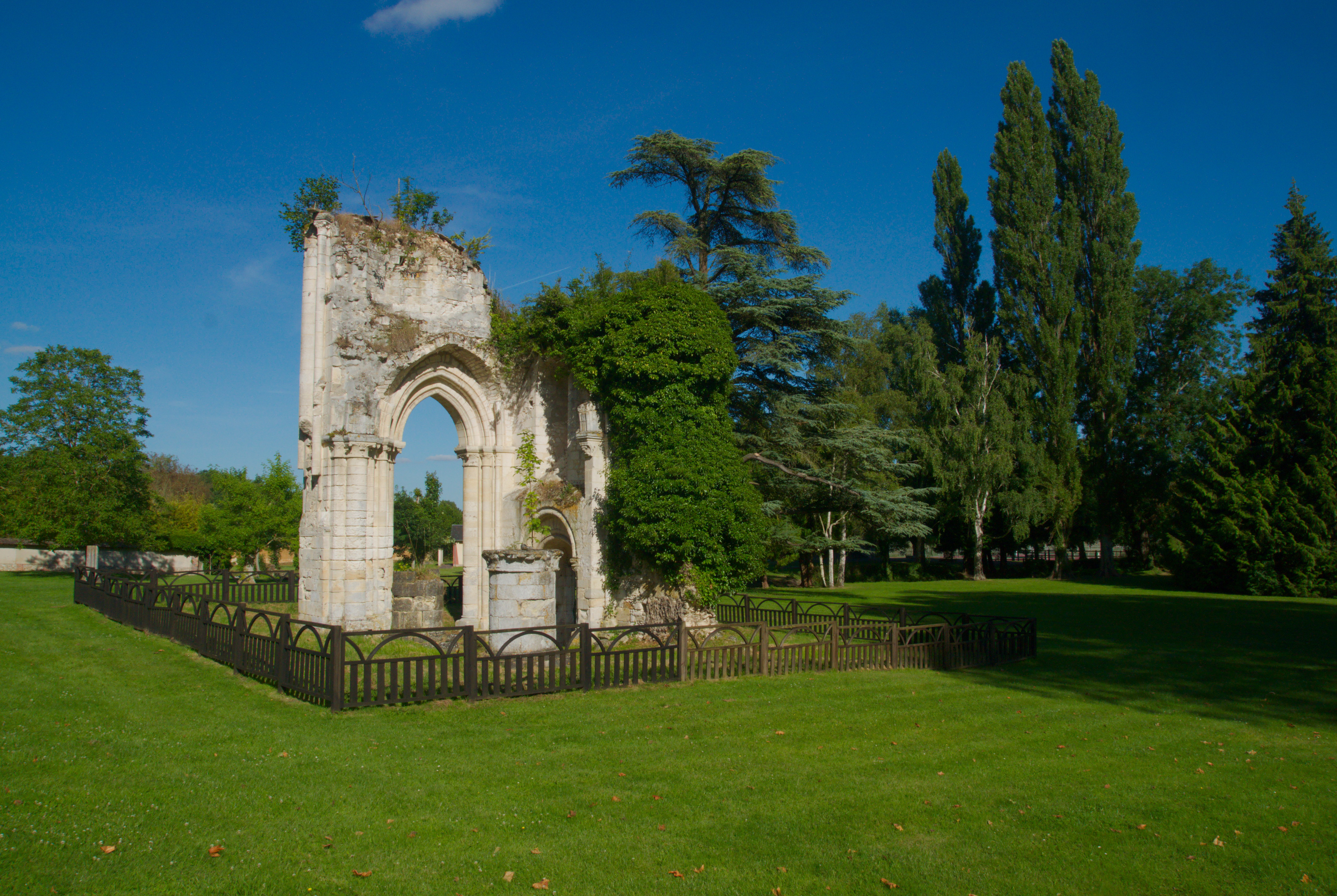
- The ruins of La Noë Abbey

- Coat of arms
- Location of La Bonneville-sur-Iton
- Location within France Location within Normandy
- Coordinates: 48°59′37″N 1°02′12″E
- Country: France
- Region: Normandy
- Department: Eure
- Arrondissement: Évreux
- Canton: Conches-en-Ouche
- Intercommunality: Pays de Conches

Government
  - Mayor (2020–2026): Olivier Rioult
- Area^{1}: 4 km^{2} (1.5 sq mi)
- Elevation: 85 m (279 ft)
- Highest elevation: 138 m (453 ft)
- Lowest elevation: 76 m (249 ft)
- Population (2023): 2,044
  - Density: 510/km^{2} (1,300/sq mi)
- Time zone: UTC+01:00 (CET)
  - Summer (DST): UTC+02:00 (CEST)
- INSEE/Postal code: 27082 /27190
- ^{1} French Land Register data, which excludes lakes, ponds, glaciers > 1 km^{2} (0.386 sq mi or 247 acres) and river estuaries.

La Bonneville-sur-Iton (French pronunciation: [la bɔnvil syʁ itɔ̃], literally La Bonneville on Iton) is a commune in the Eure department in Normandy in northern France.

== Population ==
Historical population
Year	Pop.	±% p.a.
1968	1,120	—
1975	1,316	+2.33%
1982	1,485	+1.74%
1990	2,061	+4.18%
1999	2,180	+0.63%
2007	2,305	+0.70%
2012	2,282	−0.20%
2017	2,131	−1.36%
2023	2,044	−0.69%
Source: INSEE

== See also ==
- Communes of the Eure department
