= La Croisille =

- Commune
- Location of La Croisille
- Location within France Location within Normandy
- Coordinates: 48°59′00″N 0°58′42″E
- Country: France
- Region: Normandy
- Department: Eure
- Arrondissement: Évreux
- Canton: Conches-en-Ouche

Government
  - Mayor (2020–2026): Hubert Lamy
- Area^{1}: 5.4 km^{2} (2.1 sq mi)
- Elevation: 148 m (486 ft)
- Highest elevation: 151 m (495 ft)
- Lowest elevation: 92 m (302 ft)
- Population (2023): 405
  - Density: 75/km^{2} (190/sq mi)
- Time zone: UTC+01:00 (CET)
  - Summer (DST): UTC+02:00 (CEST)
- INSEE/Postal code: 27189 /27190
- ^{1} French Land Register data, which excludes lakes, ponds, glaciers > 1 km^{2} (0.386 sq mi or 247 acres) and river estuaries.

La Croisille (French pronunciation: [la kʁwazij]) is a commune in the Eure department in northern France.

== Population ==
Historical population
Year	Pop.	±% p.a.
1968	110	—
1975	137	+3.19%
1982	213	+6.51%
1990	328	+5.54%
1999	325	−0.10%
2007	383	+2.07%
2012	440	+2.81%
2017	440	+0.00%
2023	405	−1.37%
Source: INSEE

== See also ==
- Communes of the Eure department
