= Saint-Élier =

- Commune
- Coat of arms
- Location of Saint-Élier
- Location within France Location within Normandy
- Coordinates: 48°58′43″N 0°58′04″E
- Country: France
- Region: Normandy
- Department: Eure
- Arrondissement: Évreux
- Canton: Conches-en-Ouche
- Intercommunality: CC du Pays de Conches

Government
  - Mayor (2020–2026): Jacques Hapdey
- Area^{1}: 2.32 km^{2} (0.90 sq mi)
- Elevation: 148 m (486 ft)
- Highest elevation: 151 m (495 ft)
- Lowest elevation: 95 m (312 ft)
- Population (2023): 399
  - Density: 172/km^{2} (445/sq mi)
- Time zone: UTC+01:00 (CET)
  - Summer (DST): UTC+02:00 (CEST)
- INSEE/Postal code: 27535 /27190
- ^{1} French Land Register data, which excludes lakes, ponds, glaciers > 1 km^{2} (0.386 sq mi or 247 acres) and river estuaries.

Saint-Élier (French pronunciation: [sɛ̃.t‿elje]) is a commune in the Eure department and Normandy region of northern France.

== Population ==
Historical population
Year	Pop.	±% p.a.
1968	65	—
1975	149	+12.58%
1982	423	+16.07%
1990	510	+2.37%
1999	502	−0.18%
2007	454	−1.25%
2012	439	−0.67%
2017	440	+0.05%
2023	399	−1.62%
Source: INSEE

== See also ==
- Communes of the Eure department
