= Faverolles-la-Campagne =

- Commune
- Coat of arms
- Location of Faverolles-la-Campagne
- Location within France Location within Normandy
- Coordinates: 49°00′40″N 0°55′38″E
- Country: France
- Region: Normandy
- Department: Eure
- Arrondissement: Évreux
- Canton: Conches-en-Ouche
- Intercommunality: Pays de Conches

Government
  - Mayor (2020–2026): Christophe Duflot
- Area^{1}: 4.71 km^{2} (1.82 sq mi)
- Elevation: 147 m (482 ft)
- Highest elevation: 159 m (522 ft)
- Lowest elevation: 136 m (446 ft)
- Population (2023): 152
  - Density: 32.3/km^{2} (83.6/sq mi)
- Time zone: UTC+01:00 (CET)
  - Summer (DST): UTC+02:00 (CEST)
- INSEE/Postal code: 27235 /27190
- ^{1} French Land Register data, which excludes lakes, ponds, glaciers > 1 km^{2} (0.386 sq mi or 247 acres) and river estuaries.

Faverolles-la-Campagne (French pronunciation: [favʁɔl la kɑ̃paɲ]) is a commune in the Eure department in the Normandy region in northern France.

== Population ==
Historical population
Year	Pop.	±% p.a.
1968	160	—
1975	151	−0.82%
1982	137	−1.38%
1990	140	+0.27%
1999	159	+1.42%
2007	149	−0.81%
2012	138	−1.52%
2017	159	+2.87%
2023	152	−0.75%
Source: INSEE

== See also ==
- Communes of the Eure department
