= Collandres-Quincarnon =

- Commune
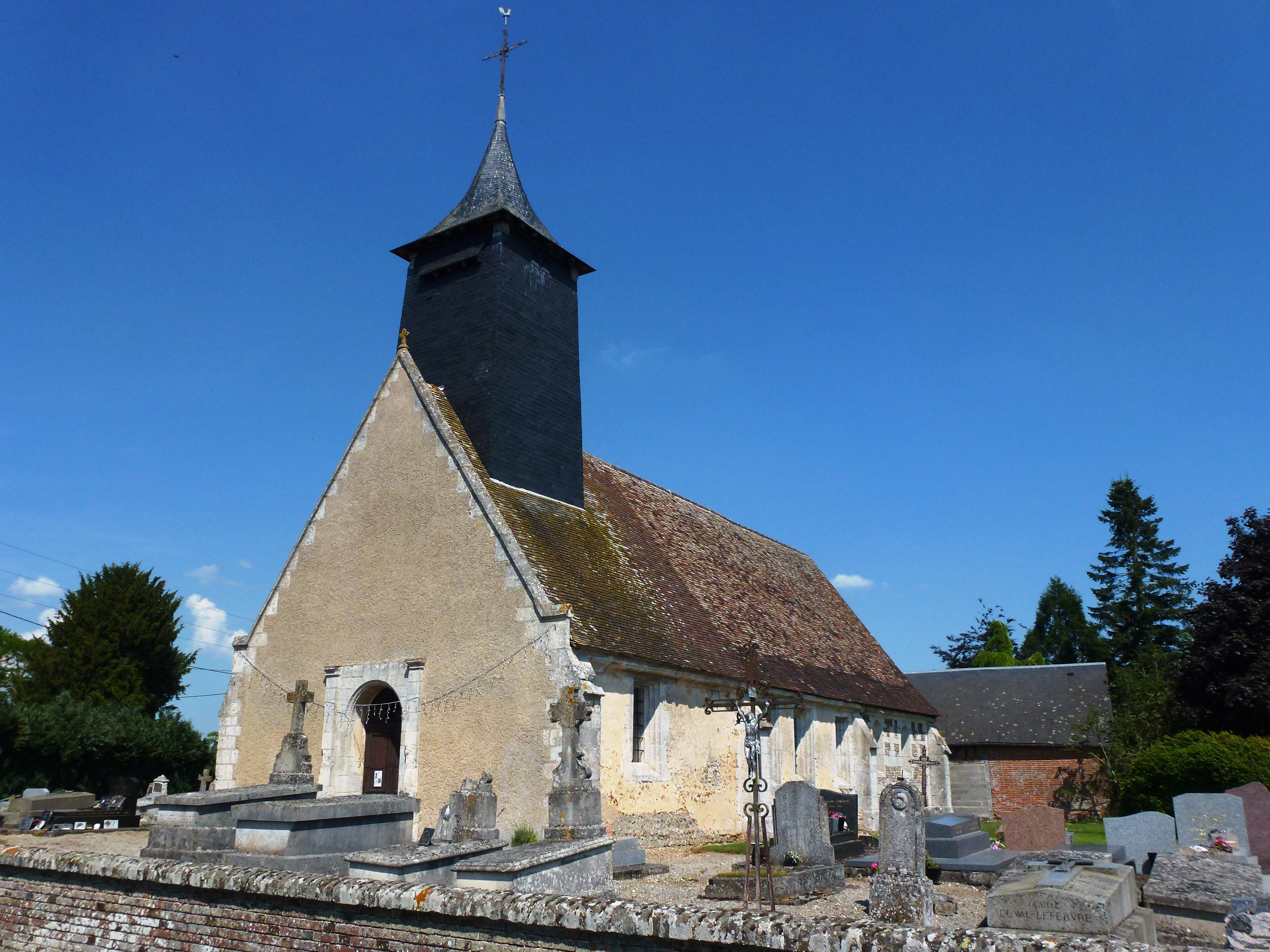
- The church in Collandres-Quincarnon
- Location of Collandres-Quincarnon
- Location within France Location within Normandy
- Coordinates: 48°59′34″N 0°50′42″E
- Country: France
- Region: Normandy
- Department: Eure
- Arrondissement: Évreux
- Canton: Conches-en-Ouche
- Intercommunality: Pays de Conches

Government
  - Mayor (2020–2026): Bruno Frichot
- Area^{1}: 7.98 km^{2} (3.08 sq mi)
- Elevation: 148 m (486 ft)
- Highest elevation: 167 m (548 ft)
- Lowest elevation: 142 m (466 ft)
- Population (2023): 267
  - Density: 33.5/km^{2} (86.7/sq mi)
- Time zone: UTC+01:00 (CET)
  - Summer (DST): UTC+02:00 (CEST)
- INSEE/Postal code: 27162 /27190
- ^{1} French Land Register data, which excludes lakes, ponds, glaciers > 1 km^{2} (0.386 sq mi or 247 acres) and river estuaries.

Collandres-Quincarnon (French pronunciation: [kɔlɑ̃dʁ kɛ̃kaʁnɔ̃]) is a commune in the Eure department in northern France.

== Population ==
Historical population
Year	Pop.	±% p.a.
1968	171	—
1975	175	+0.33%
1982	155	−1.72%
1990	165	+0.78%
1999	192	+1.70%
2007	198	+0.39%
2012	209	+1.09%
2017	233	+2.20%
2023	267	+2.30%
Source: INSEE

== See also ==
- Communes of the Eure department
