= Arrondissement of Évreux =

Coordinates: 49.02°N 1.15°E

Évreux
- Arrondissement
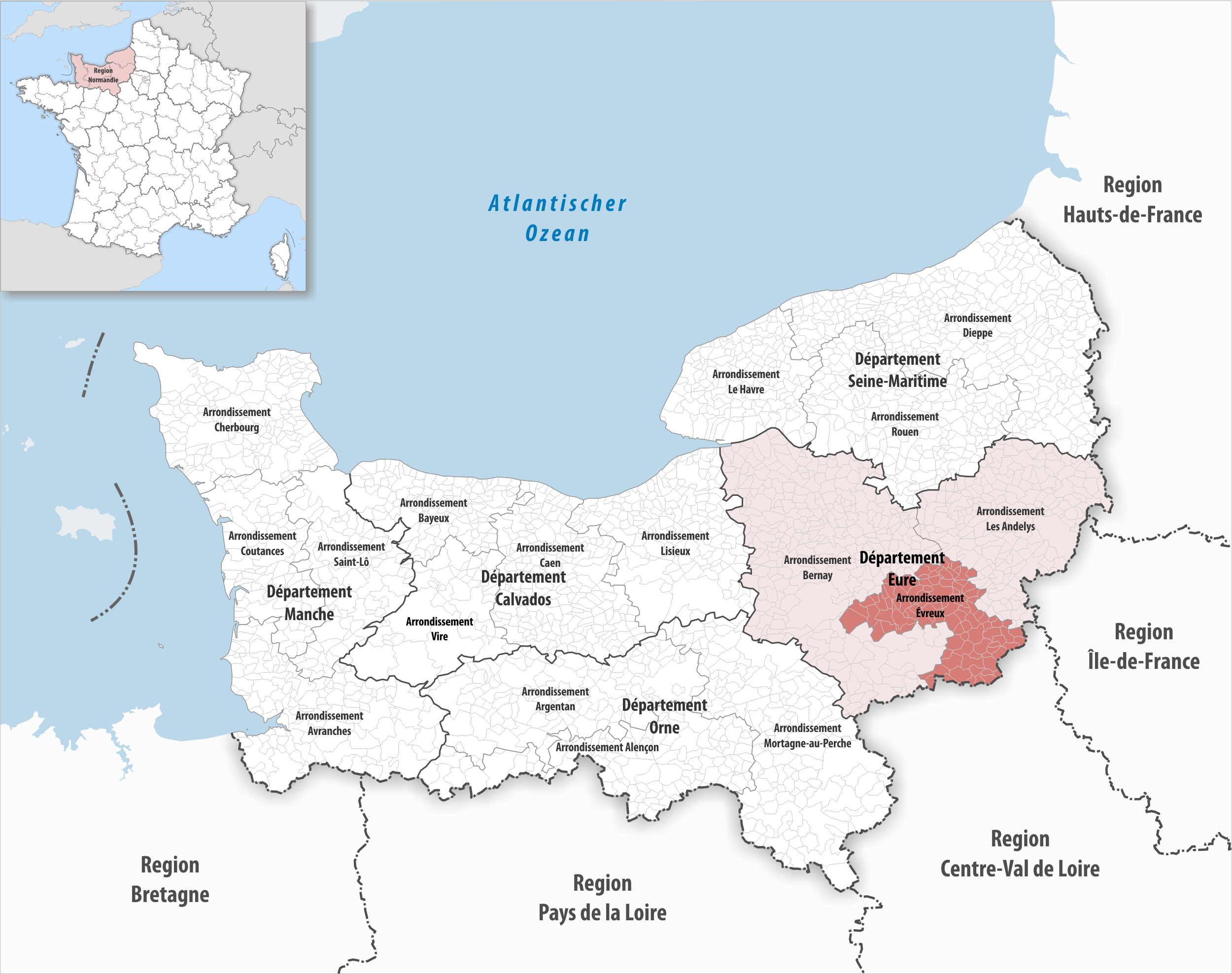
- Location within the region Normandy
- Country: France
- Region: Normandy
- Department: Eure
- No. of communes: {{{nbcomm}}}
- Area: 958.7 km^{2} (370.2 sq mi)
- Population (2023): 142,251
  - Density: 148.4/km^{2} (384.3/sq mi)
- INSEE code: 273

The arrondissement of Évreux is an arrondissement of France in the Eure department in the Normandy region. It has 103 communes. Its population is 138,626 (2021), and its area is 958.7 km^{2} (370.2 sq mi).

== Composition ==
The communes of the arrondissement of Évreux are:

1. Acon
2. Angerville-la-Campagne
3. Arnières-sur-Iton
4. Aulnay-sur-Iton
5. Les Authieux
6. Aviron
7. La Baronnie
8. Les Baux-Sainte-Croix
9. Beaubray
10. Bois-le-Roi
11. Boncourt
12. La Bonneville-sur-Iton
13. Le Boulay-Morin
14. Bretagnolles
15. Burey
16. Caugé
17. Champ-Dolent
18. Champigny-la-Futelaye
19. La Chapelle-du-Bois-des-Faulx
20. Chavigny-Bailleul
21. Cierrey
22. Claville
23. Collandres-Quincarnon
24. Conches-en-Ouche
25. Coudres
26. Courdemanche
27. La Couture-Boussey
28. La Croisille
29. Croth
30. Dardez
31. Droisy
32. Émalleville
33. Épieds
34. Évreux
35. Ézy-sur-Eure
36. Fauville
37. Faverolles-la-Campagne
38. Ferrières-Haut-Clocher
39. La Ferrière-sur-Risle
40. Le Fidelaire
41. La Forêt-du-Parc
42. Foucrainville
43. Fresney
44. Garennes-sur-Eure
45. Gauciel
46. Gaudreville-la-Rivière
47. Gauville-la-Campagne
48. Glisolles
49. Gravigny
50. Grossœuvre
51. Guichainville
52. L'Habit
53. Huest
54. Illiers-l'Évêque
55. Irreville
56. Ivry-la-Bataille
57. Jumelles
58. Lignerolles
59. Louversey
60. Louye
61. La Madeleine-de-Nonancourt
62. Marcilly-la-Campagne
63. Marcilly-sur-Eure
64. Le Mesnil-Fuguet
65. Mesnil-sur-l'Estrée
66. Miserey
67. Moisville
68. Mouettes
69. Mousseaux-Neuville
70. Muzy
71. Nagel-Séez-Mesnil
72. Nogent-le-Sec
73. Nonancourt
74. Normanville
75. Ormes
76. Parville
77. Le Plessis-Grohan
78. Portes
79. Prey
80. Reuilly
81. Sacquenville
82. Saint-André-de-l'Eure
83. Saint-Élier
84. Sainte-Marthe
85. Saint-Georges-Motel
86. Saint-Germain-de-Fresney
87. Saint-Germain-des-Angles
88. Saint-Germain-sur-Avre
89. Saint-Laurent-des-Bois
90. Saint-Luc
91. Saint-Martin-la-Campagne
92. Saint-Sébastien-de-Morsent
93. Saint-Vigor
94. Sassey
95. Sébécourt
96. Serez
97. Tilleul-Dame-Agnès
98. Tourneville
99. La Trinité
100. Le Val-David
101. Le Val-Doré
102. Les Ventes
103. Le Vieil-Évreux

== History ==
The arrondissement of Évreux was created in 1800. On 1 January 2006, the two cantons of Louviers-Nord and Louviers-Sud that previously belonged to the arrondissement of Évreux were added to the arrondissement of Les Andelys, and the canton of Amfreville-la-Campagne to the arrondissement of Bernay. At the January 2017 reorganisation of the arrondissements of Eure, it lost 35 communes to the arrondissement of Les Andelys and 77 communes to the arrondissement of Bernay, and it gained one commune from the arrondissement of Bernay.

As a result of the reorganisation of the cantons of France which came into effect in 2015, the borders of the cantons are no longer related to the borders of the arrondissements. The cantons of the arrondissement of Évreux were, as of January 2015:

1. Breteuil
2. Conches-en-Ouche
3. Damville
4. Évreux-Est
5. Évreux-Nord
6. Évreux-Ouest
7. Évreux-Sud
8. Le Neubourg
9. Nonancourt
10. Pacy-sur-Eure
11. Rugles
12. Saint-André-de-l'Eure
13. Verneuil-sur-Avre
14. Vernon-Nord
15. Vernon-Sud
