= Claville =

- Commune
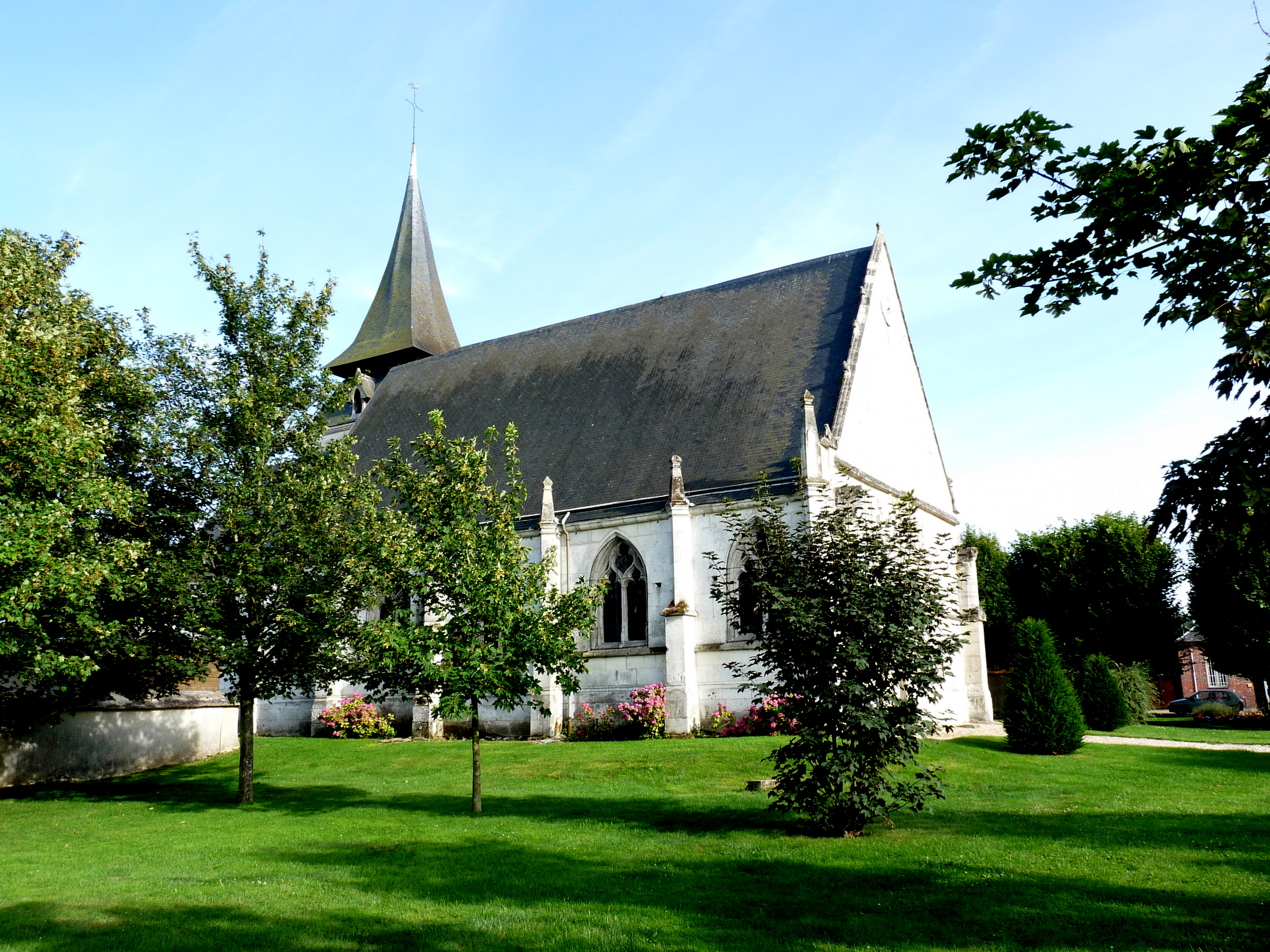
- The church in Claville

- Coat of arms
- Location of Claville
- Location within France Location within Normandy
- Coordinates: 49°02′55″N 1°01′13″E
- Country: France
- Region: Normandy
- Department: Eure
- Arrondissement: Évreux
- Canton: Conches-en-Ouche
- Intercommunality: Pays de Conches

Government
  - Mayor (2020–2026): Gérard Thébaud
- Area^{1}: 17.66 km^{2} (6.82 sq mi)
- Elevation: 146 m (479 ft)
- Highest elevation: 152 m (499 ft)
- Lowest elevation: 133 m (436 ft)
- Population (2023): 1,078
  - Density: 61.04/km^{2} (158.1/sq mi)
- Time zone: UTC+01:00 (CET)
  - Summer (DST): UTC+02:00 (CEST)
- INSEE/Postal code: 27161 /27180
- ^{1} French Land Register data, which excludes lakes, ponds, glaciers > 1 km^{2} (0.386 sq mi or 247 acres) and river estuaries.

Claville (French pronunciation: [klavil]) is a commune in the Eure department in northern France.

== Population ==
Historical population
Year	Pop.	±% p.a.
1968	438	—
1975	577	+4.02%
1982	665	+2.05%
1990	862	+3.30%
1999	1,031	+2.01%
2007	1,039	+0.10%
2012	1,084	+0.85%
2017	1,082	−0.04%
2023	1,078	−0.06%
Source: INSEE

== See also ==
- Communes of the Eure department
