= Caugé =

- Commune
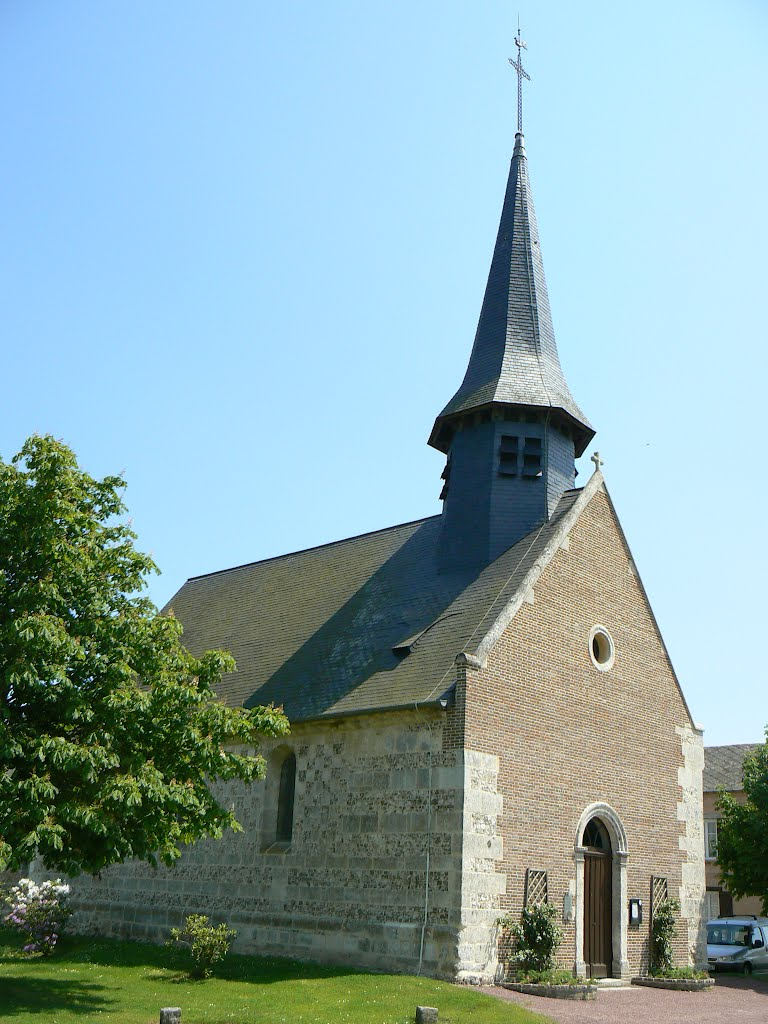
- The church in Caugé

- Coat of arms
- Location of Caugé
- Location within France Location within Normandy
- Coordinates: 49°01′33″N 1°02′08″E
- Country: France
- Region: Normandy
- Department: Eure
- Arrondissement: Évreux
- Canton: Conches-en-Ouche
- Intercommunality: CA Évreux Portes de Normandie

Government
  - Mayor (2020–2026): Jean-Marie Maillard
- Area^{1}: 11.61 km^{2} (4.48 sq mi)
- Elevation: 142 m (466 ft)
- Highest elevation: 146 m (479 ft)
- Lowest elevation: 105 m (344 ft)
- Population (2023): 807
  - Density: 69.5/km^{2} (180/sq mi)
- Time zone: UTC+01:00 (CET)
  - Summer (DST): UTC+02:00 (CEST)
- INSEE/Postal code: 27132 /27180
- ^{1} French Land Register data, which excludes lakes, ponds, glaciers > 1 km^{2} (0.386 sq mi or 247 acres) and river estuaries.

Caugé (French pronunciation: [koʒe]) is a commune in the Eure department in northern France.

== Population ==
Historical population
Year	Pop.	±% p.a.
1968	243	—
1975	321	+4.06%
1982	609	+9.58%
1990	749	+2.62%
1999	746	−0.04%
2007	828	+1.31%
2012	830	+0.05%
2017	866	+0.85%
2023	807	−1.17%
Source: INSEE

== See also ==
- Communes of the Eure department
