= Glisolles =

- Commune
- Coat of arms
- Location of Glisolles
- Location within France Location within Normandy
- Coordinates: 48°59′03″N 1°01′17″E
- Country: France
- Region: Normandy
- Department: Eure
- Arrondissement: Évreux
- Canton: Conches-en-Ouche
- Intercommunality: Pays de Conches

Government
  - Mayor (2020–2026): Bruno Leveque
- Area^{1}: 10.92 km^{2} (4.22 sq mi)
- Elevation: 129 m (423 ft)
- Highest elevation: 158 m (518 ft)
- Lowest elevation: 83 m (272 ft)
- Population (2023): 838
  - Density: 76.7/km^{2} (199/sq mi)
- Time zone: UTC+01:00 (CET)
  - Summer (DST): UTC+02:00 (CEST)
- INSEE/Postal code: 27287 /27190
- ^{1} French Land Register data, which excludes lakes, ponds, glaciers > 1 km^{2} (0.386 sq mi or 247 acres) and river estuaries.

Glisolles (French pronunciation: [ɡlizɔl]) is a commune in the Eure department in northern France.

== Population ==
Historical population
Year	Pop.	±% p.a.
1968	224	—
1975	311	+4.80%
1982	525	+7.77%
1990	846	+6.15%
1999	872	+0.34%
2007	874	+0.03%
2012	825	−1.15%
2017	847	+0.53%
2023	838	−0.18%
Source: INSEE

== See also ==
- Communes of the Eure department
