= Canton of Conches-en-Ouche =

Coordinates: 48.96°N 0.94°E

The canton of Conches-en-Ouche is an administrative division of the Eure department, northern France. Its borders were modified at the French canton reorganisation which came into effect in March 2015. Its seat is in Conches-en-Ouche.

It consists of the following communes:

1. Aulnay-sur-Iton
2. Beaubray
3. La Bonneville-sur-Iton
4. Burey
5. Caugé
6. Champ-Dolent
7. Claville
8. Collandres-Quincarnon
9. Conches-en-Ouche
10. La Croisille
11. Faverolles-la-Campagne
12. Ferrières-Haut-Clocher
13. La Ferrière-sur-Risle
14. Le Fidelaire
15. Gaudreville-la-Rivière
16. Gauville-la-Campagne
17. Glisolles
18. Louversey
19. Nagel-Séez-Mesnil
20. Nogent-le-Sec
21. Ormes
22. Parville
23. Portes
24. Saint-Élier
25. Sainte-Marthe
26. Sébécourt
27. Tilleul-Dame-Agnès
28. Le Val-Doré
29. Les Ventes
