= Verneuil-sur-Avre =

- Part of Verneuil d'Avre et d'Iton
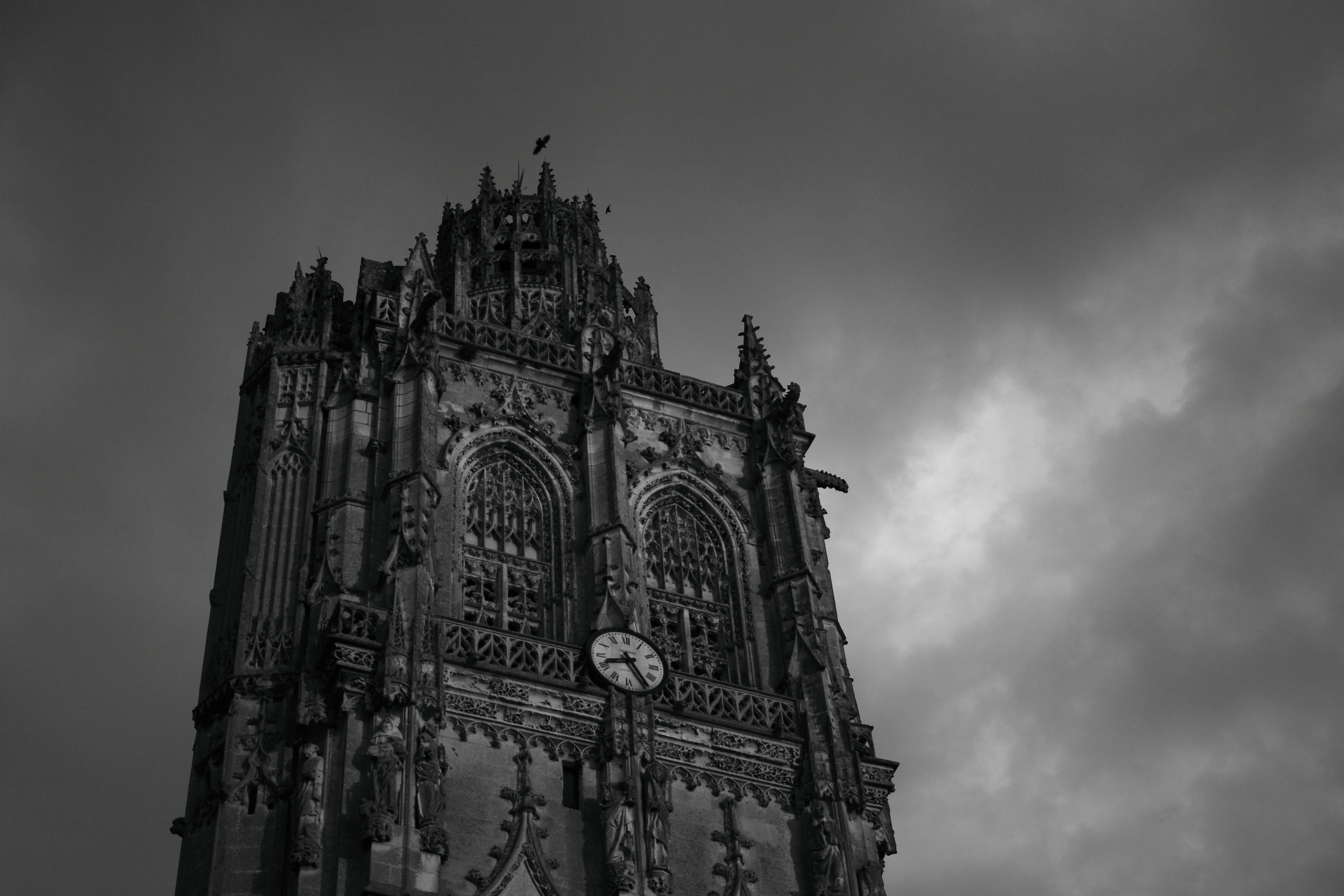
- Tower of the Church of the Madeleine

- Coat of arms
- Location of Verneuil-sur-Avre
- Location within France Location within Normandy
- Coordinates: 48°44′22″N 0°55′43″E
- Country: France
- Region: Normandy
- Department: Eure
- Arrondissement: Évreux
- Canton: Verneuil-sur-Avre
- Commune: Verneuil d'Avre et d'Iton
- Area^{1}: 31.97 km^{2} (12.34 sq mi)
- Highest elevation: 193 m (633 ft)
- Lowest elevation: 147 m (482 ft)
- Population (2022): 6,115
  - Density: 191.3/km^{2} (495.4/sq mi)
- Time zone: UTC+01:00 (CET)
  - Summer (DST): UTC+02:00 (CEST)
- Postal code: 27130
- ^{1} French Land Register data, which excludes lakes, ponds, glaciers > 1 km^{2} (0.386 sq mi or 247 acres) and river estuaries.

Verneuil-sur-Avre (French pronunciation: [vɛʁnœj syʁ avʁ], literally Verneuil on Avre) is a former commune in the Eure department in Normandy in northern France. On 1 January 2017, it was merged into the new commune Verneuil d'Avre et d'Iton.

== History ==
Following the revolt of the nobles of 1118-1120, Verneuil-sur-Avre was founded in 1120 by Henry I, the fourth son of William the Conqueror. Some of the main rebels were Richer de l'Aigle, Robert de Neubourg and Eustace of Breteuil who all possessed territory in the surrounding area. Once these rebels submitted to Henry I, the fortifications in Verneuil-sur-Avre were intended to control the region.

In August 1424, during the Hundred Years' War the battle of Verneuil was fought just to the north of the town. An English army of 9,000 men beat a joint Franco-Scottish army of 15,000 men and as a result gained control of Normandy and Aquitaine and destroyed Scottish participation in the war. The town was recaptured in 1449.

== Main sights ==
There are several landmarks in Verneuil-sur-Avre that are worthy of interest:

- the Église de la Madeleine (St Mary Magdalene Church, built between the 12th and 16th centuries), which was labelled a “monument historique” (national heritage site) in 1862, has become the emblem of the city. Its tower is a well-known example of the late-gothic style (called Flamboyant Gothic Style, literally “flaming”). The tower culminates at 56 metres (approximately 61 yards), and is visible from the entire surrounding countryside and, in winter, from as far away as the Chartres Cathedral. This building has been compared to the Tour du Beurre (“Tower of Butter”) of the Rouen Cathedral and the lantern-tower of the Abbaye Saint-Ouen de Rouen (St Ouen Church), also in Rouen, despite being smaller. This tower is known to be one of the sources of inspiration for the Tribune Tower in Chicago, a 141-metre-high skyscraper built in 1925 (approximately 154 yards).
- the Eglise Notre-Dame (Notre-Dame Church, 12th-19th centuries)
- the Tour Grise (Grey Tower, 13th century) was erected by the French king Philip Augustus. It was named for the stones used in its construction, which are brown and called “grison” (“gris” meaning “grey” in French).
- the Abbaye Saint-Nicolas (St Nicholas Abbey, 17th century)
- the Espace Saint-Laurent (St Lawrence Hall), a former church currently used as an exhibition hall
- the ruins of the Eglise Saint-Jean (St John Church), which was bombed during WWII, in 1944
- the building that currently houses the Jerôme Carcopino Municipal Library (15th century), named for an historian from Verneuil-sur-Avre. This building has been labelled a “monument historique”.

Besides these landmarks, Verneuil-sur-Avre has examples of regional architectural style and half-timbered houses traditional to Normandy.

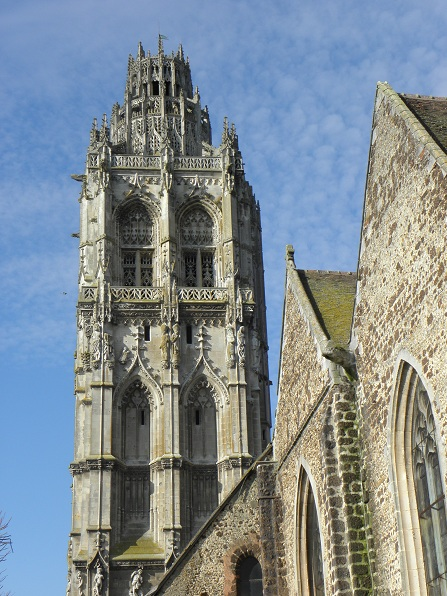
Tower of St Mary Magdalene Church

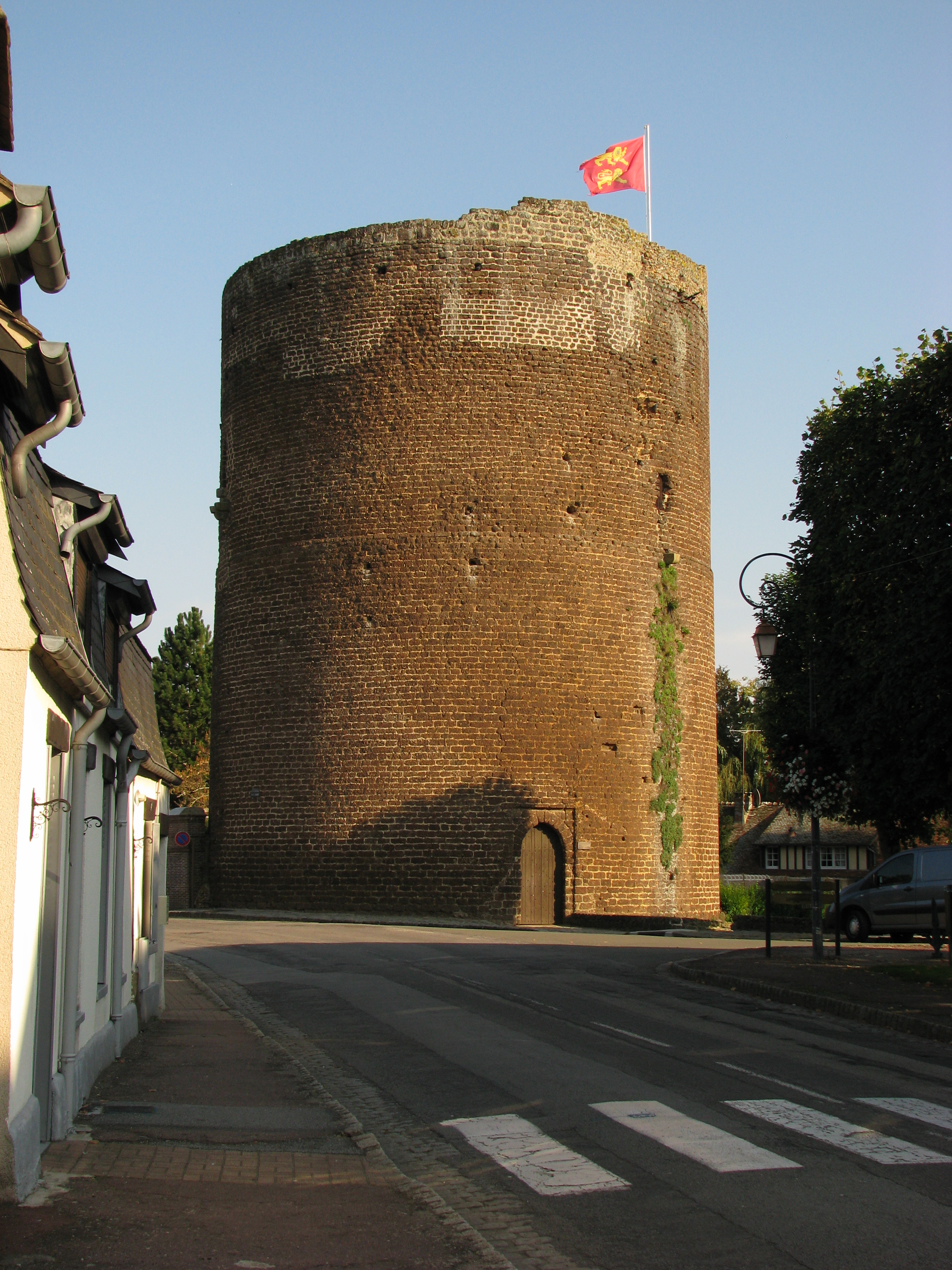
Grey Tower

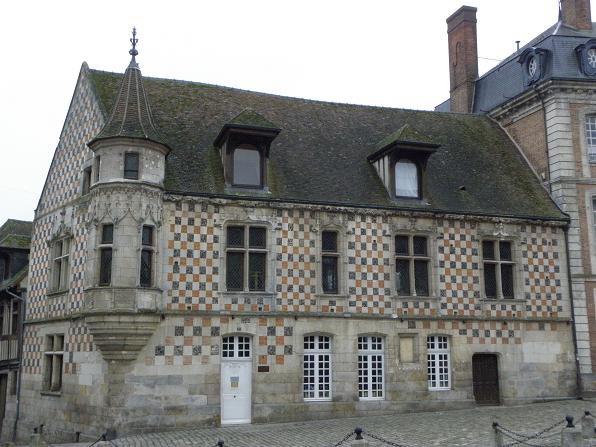
Municipal Library building (15th century)

== Demography ==
Historical population
Year	Pop.	±% p.a.
1962	5,551	—
1968	6,012	+1.34%
1975	6,499	+1.12%
1982	6,698	+0.43%
1990	6,446	−0.48%
1999	6,619	+0.29%
2006	6,655	+0.08%
2022	6,115	−0.53%
Source: EHESS and INSEE

== International relations ==
The town is twinned with Stowmarket, Suffolk, England.

== See also ==
- Communes of the Eure department
- Perche
