= Verneuil d'Avre et d'Iton =

- Commune
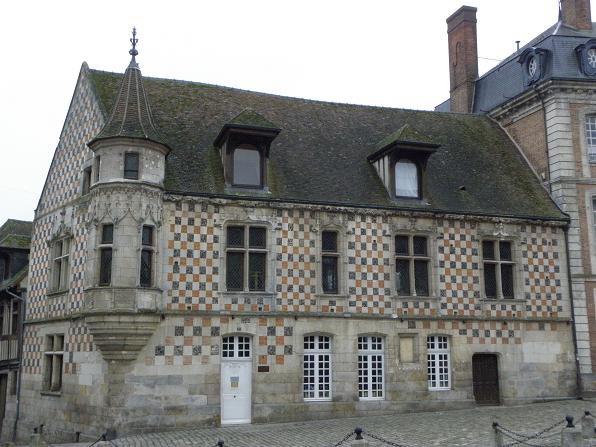
- A renaissance house in Verneuil-sur-Avre

- Coat of arms
- Location of Verneuil d'Avre et d'Iton
- Location within France Location within Normandy
- Coordinates: 48°44′20″N 0°55′44″E
- Country: France
- Region: Normandy
- Department: Eure
- Arrondissement: Bernay
- Canton: Verneuil d'Avre et d'Iton, Breteuil

Government
  - Mayor (2021–2026): Yves-Marie Rivemale
- Area^{1}: 56.00 km^{2} (21.62 sq mi)
- Population (2023): 7,193
  - Density: 128.4/km^{2} (332.7/sq mi)
- Time zone: UTC+01:00 (CET)
  - Summer (DST): UTC+02:00 (CEST)
- INSEE/Postal code: 27679 /27130, 27160
- ^{1} French Land Register data, which excludes lakes, ponds, glaciers > 1 km^{2} (0.386 sq mi or 247 acres) and river estuaries.

Verneuil d'Avre et d'Iton (French pronunciation: [vɛʁnœj davʁ e ditɔ̃], literally Verneuil of Avre and of Iton) is a commune in the department of Eure, northern France. The municipality was established on 1 January 2017 by merger of the former communes of Verneuil-sur-Avre (the seat) and Francheville. Verneuil-sur-Avre station has rail connections to Argentan, Paris and Granville. Verneuil d'Avre is twinned with Stowmarket, in the English county of Suffolk.

== Population ==
Population data refer to the commune in its geography as of January 2025.

Historical population
Year	Pop.	±% p.a.
1968	6,880	—
1975	7,325	+0.90%
1982	7,534	+0.40%
1990	7,393	−0.24%
1999	7,770	+0.55%
2007	7,919	+0.24%
2012	7,473	−1.15%
2017	8,170	+1.80%
2023	7,193	−2.10%
Source: INSEE

== See also ==
- Communes of the Eure department
