= Avre =

Avre may refer to:

- Avre (Eure), a river in northwestern France, tributary of the Eure
- Avre (Somme), a river in northern France, tributary of the Somme

== See also ==
- AVRE, Armoured Vehicle Royal Engineers
