= Francheville =

Francheville may refer to the following places:

- in France:
  - Francheville, Côte-d'Or, in the Côte-d'Or département
  - Francheville, Eure, in the Eure département
  - Francheville, Jura, in the Jura département
  - Francheville, Marne, in the Marne département
  - Francheville, Meurthe-et-Moselle, in the Meurthe-et-Moselle département
  - Francheville, Metropolis of Lyon, in the Metropolis of Lyon
  - Francheville, Orne, in the Orne département
  - La Francheville, in the Ardennes Department
- in Canada:
  - Francheville (census division), a statistical area in Quebec.
  - Francheville Regional County Municipality, a former regional county municipality in Quebec.
