= Acon, Eure =

Acon
- Commune
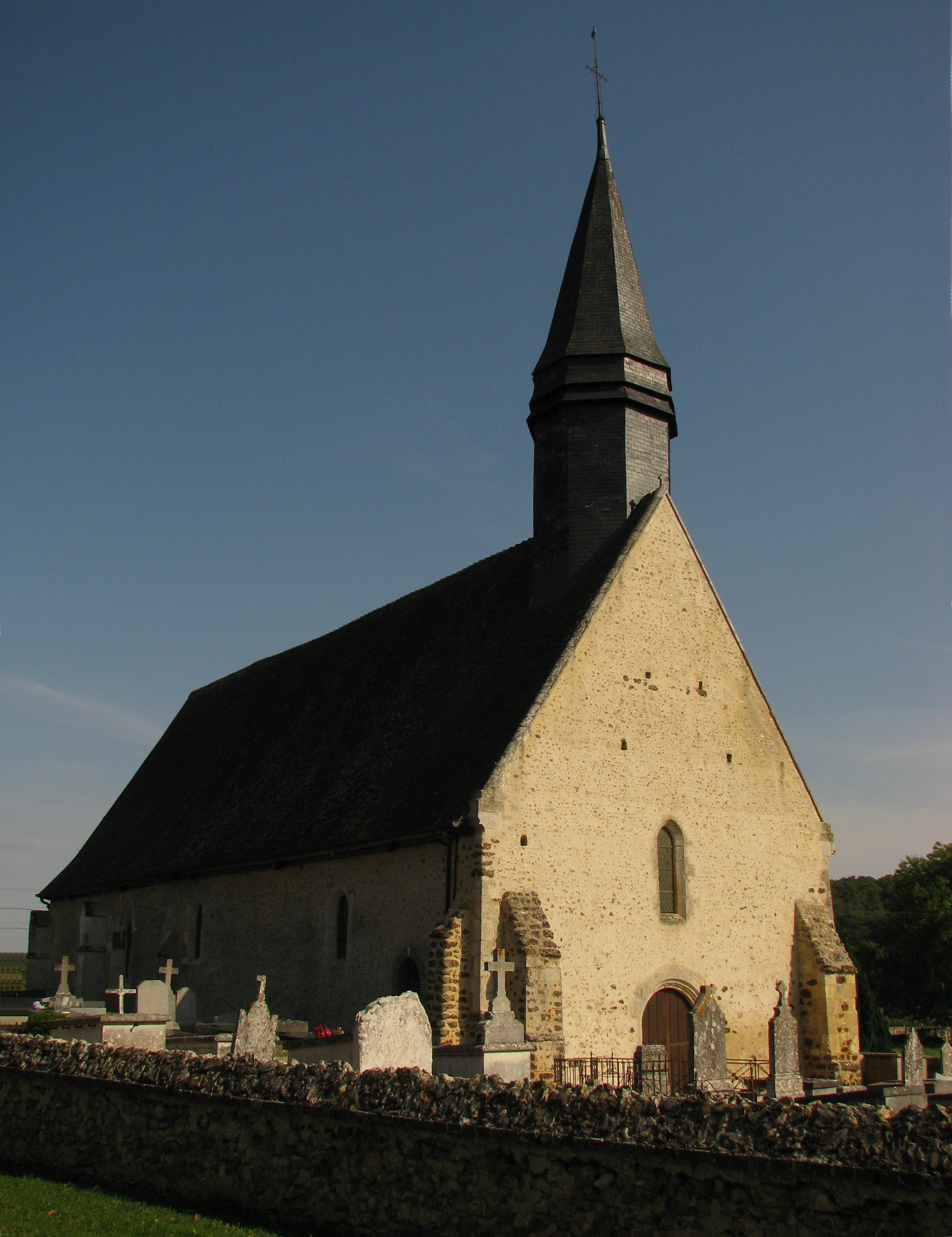
- The church in Acon
- Location of Acon
- Location within France Location within Normandy
- Coordinates: 48°46′24″N 1°05′30″E
- Country: France
- Region: Normandy
- Department: Eure
- Arrondissement: Évreux
- Canton: Verneuil d'Avre et d'Iton
- Intercommunality: Évreux Portes de Normandie

Government
  - Mayor (2020–2026): Frédérique Savel
- Area^{1}: 9.16 km^{2} (3.54 sq mi)
- Elevation: 174 m (571 ft)
- Highest elevation: 179 m (587 ft)
- Lowest elevation: 115 m (377 ft)
- Population (2023): 478
  - Density: 52.2/km^{2} (135/sq mi)
- Time zone: UTC+01:00 (CET)
  - Summer (DST): UTC+02:00 (CEST)
- INSEE/Postal code: 27002 /27570
- ^{1} French Land Register data, which excludes lakes, ponds, glaciers > 1 km^{2} (0.386 sq mi or 247 acres) and river estuaries.

Acon (French pronunciation: [akɔ̃]) is a commune in the Eure department in Normandy in northern France.

== Geography ==
Acon is a small country village divided by the Route nationale 12. On one side are the Brulés d'Acon and on the other are the Rousset and the Mesnil d'Acon. The Avre river flows between the Brulés and the Rousset et le Mesnil, not unlike the main road does.

== Population ==
Historical population
| Year | Pop. | ±% p.a. |
|---|---|---|
| 1968 | 289 | — |
| 1975 | 250 | −2.05% |
| 1982 | 317 | +3.45% |
| 1990 | 356 | +1.46% |
| 1999 | 407 | +1.50% |
| 2007 | 458 | +1.49% |
| 2012 | 472 | +0.60% |
| 2017 | 468 | −0.17% |
| 2023 | 478 | +0.35% |
Source: INSEE

== Sights ==
The St Denis church can be found next to the Avre river.

== See also ==
- Communes of the Eure department
