= Saint-Christophe-sur-Avre =

- Commune
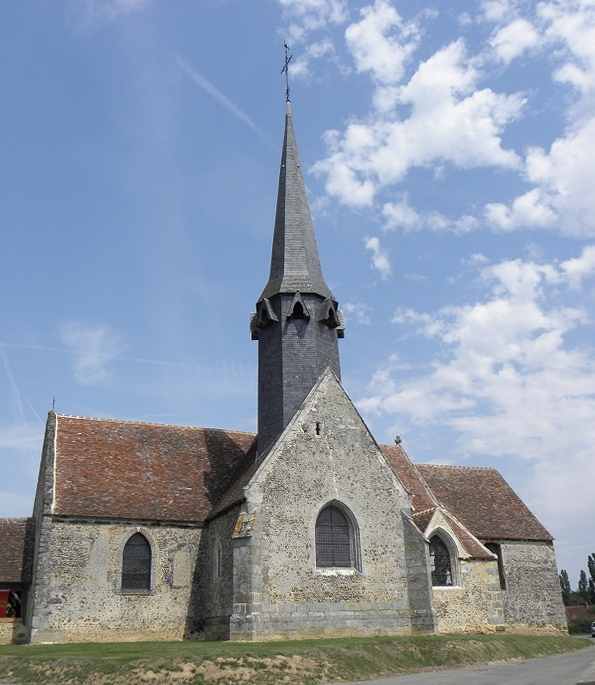
- The church in Saint-Christophe-sur-Avre

- Coat of arms
- Location of Saint-Christophe-sur-Avre
- Location within France Location within Normandy
- Coordinates: 48°42′04″N 0°49′02″E
- Country: France
- Region: Normandy
- Department: Eure
- Arrondissement: Bernay
- Canton: Verneuil d'Avre et d'Iton

Government
  - Mayor (2020–2026): Christophe Levesque
- Area^{1}: 10.76 km^{2} (4.15 sq mi)
- Elevation: 211 m (692 ft)
- Highest elevation: 214 m (702 ft)
- Lowest elevation: 173 m (568 ft)
- Population (2023): 145
  - Density: 13.5/km^{2} (34.9/sq mi)
- Time zone: UTC+01:00 (CET)
  - Summer (DST): UTC+02:00 (CEST)
- INSEE/Postal code: 27521 /27820
- ^{1} French Land Register data, which excludes lakes, ponds, glaciers > 1 km^{2} (0.386 sq mi or 247 acres) and river estuaries.

Saint-Christophe-sur-Avre (French pronunciation: [sɛ̃ kʁistɔf syʁ avʁ], literally Saint-Christophe on Avre) is a commune in the Eure department in Normandy in northern France.

== Population ==
Historical population
Year	Pop.	±% p.a.
1968	148	—
1975	138	−0.99%
1982	142	+0.41%
1990	152	+0.85%
1999	151	−0.07%
2007	150	−0.08%
2012	150	+0.00%
2017	142	−1.09%
2023	145	+0.35%
Source: INSEE

== See also ==
- Communes of the Eure department
