= Breux-sur-Avre =

- Commune
- Location of Breux-sur-Avre
- Location within France Location within Normandy
- Coordinates: 48°46′15″N 1°03′39″E
- Country: France
- Region: Normandy
- Department: Eure
- Arrondissement: Bernay
- Canton: Verneuil d'Avre et d'Iton

Government
  - Mayor (2020–2026): Alexandre Pourvu
- Area^{1}: 7.08 km^{2} (2.73 sq mi)
- Elevation: 132 m (433 ft)
- Highest elevation: 179 m (587 ft)
- Lowest elevation: 119 m (390 ft)
- Population (2023): 326
  - Density: 46.0/km^{2} (119/sq mi)
- Time zone: UTC+01:00 (CET)
  - Summer (DST): UTC+02:00 (CEST)
- INSEE/Postal code: 27115 /27570
- ^{1} French Land Register data, which excludes lakes, ponds, glaciers > 1 km^{2} (0.386 sq mi or 247 acres) and river estuaries.

Breux-sur-Avre (French pronunciation: [bʁø syʁ avʁ], literally Breux on Avre) is a commune in the Eure department in Normandy in northern France.

== Population ==
Historical population
Year	Pop.	±% p.a.
1968	198	—
1975	201	+0.22%
1982	208	+0.49%
1990	218	+0.59%
1999	293	+3.34%
2007	327	+1.38%
2012	353	+1.54%
2017	346	−0.40%
2023	326	−0.99%
Source: INSEE

== See also ==
- Communes of the Eure department
