= Avrilly =

Avrilly is the name of several communes in France:

- Avrilly, Allier, in the Allier département
- Avrilly, Eure, in the Eure département
- Avrilly, Orne, in the Orne département
