= Thomer-la-Sôgne =

- Part of Chambois
- Location of Thomer-la-Sôgne
- Location within France Location within Normandy
- Coordinates: 48°54′37″N 1°10′16″E
- Country: France
- Region: Normandy
- Department: Eure
- Arrondissement: Bernay
- Canton: Verneuil-sur-Avre
- Commune: Chambois
- Area^{1}: 9.1 km^{2} (3.5 sq mi)
- Elevation: 147 m (482 ft)
- Highest elevation: 154 m (505 ft)
- Lowest elevation: 139 m (456 ft)
- Population (2018): 344
  - Density: 38/km^{2} (98/sq mi)
- Time zone: UTC+01:00 (CET)
  - Summer (DST): UTC+02:00 (CEST)
- Postal code: 27240
- ^{1} French Land Register data, which excludes lakes, ponds, glaciers > 1 km^{2} (0.386 sq mi or 247 acres) and river estuaries.

Thomer-la-Sôgne (French pronunciation: [tɔmɛʁ la soɲ]) is a former commune in the Eure department in Normandy in northern France. On 1 January 2016, it was merged into the new commune of Chambois.

== See also ==
- Communes of the Eure department
