= Saint-Victor-sur-Avre =

- Commune
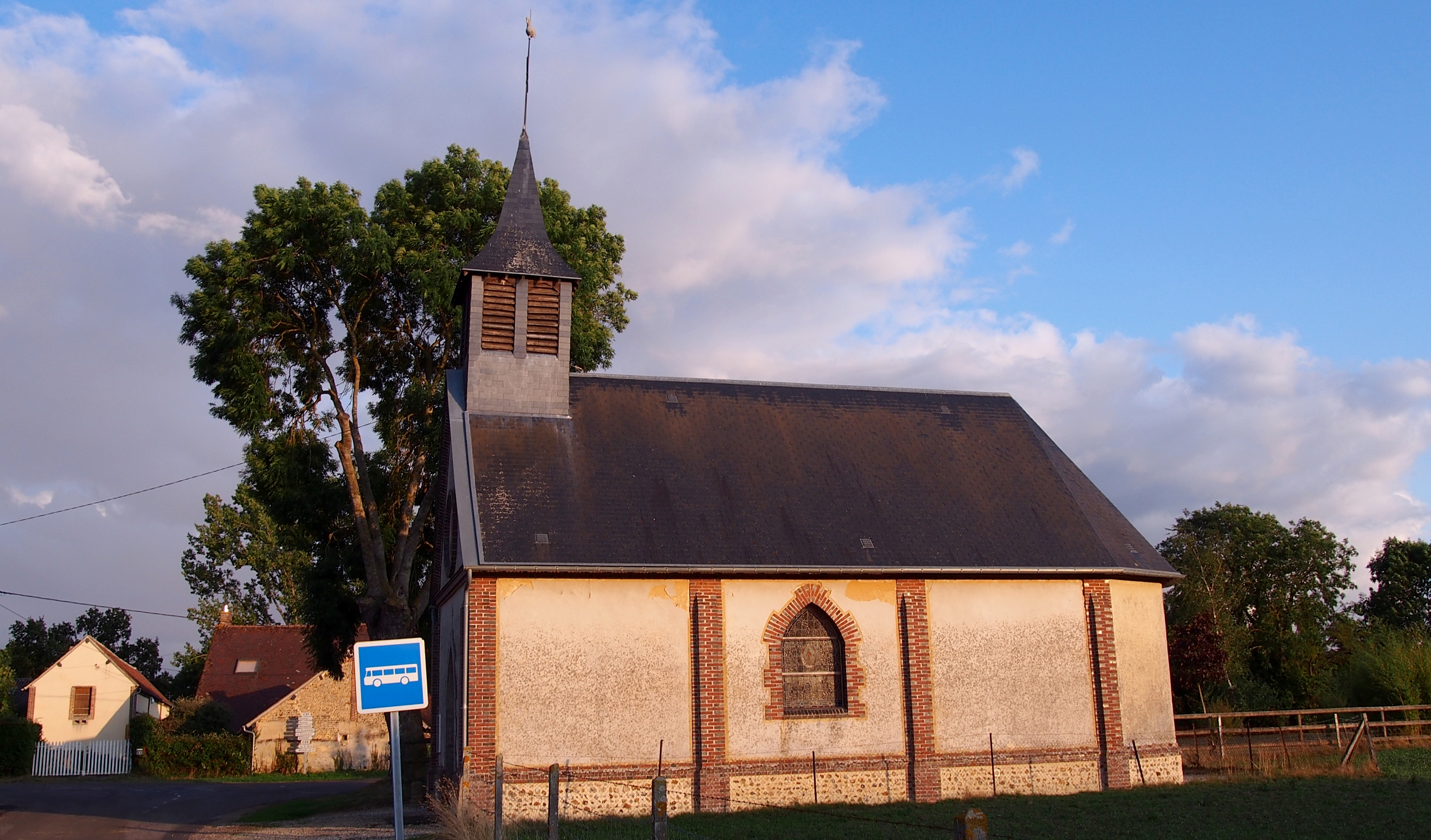
- Location of Saint-Victor-sur-Avre
- Location within France Location within Normandy
- Coordinates: 48°42′12″N 0°51′23″E
- Country: France
- Region: Normandy
- Department: Eure
- Arrondissement: Bernay
- Canton: Verneuil d'Avre et d'Iton

Government
  - Mayor (2020–2026): Geneviève Dheygers
- Area^{1}: 6.9 km^{2} (2.7 sq mi)
- Elevation: 209 m (686 ft)
- Highest elevation: 206 m (676 ft)
- Lowest elevation: 167 m (548 ft)
- Population (2023): 54
  - Density: 7.8/km^{2} (20/sq mi)
- Time zone: UTC+01:00 (CET)
  - Summer (DST): UTC+02:00 (CEST)
- INSEE/Postal code: 27610 /27130
- ^{1} French Land Register data, which excludes lakes, ponds, glaciers > 1 km^{2} (0.386 sq mi or 247 acres) and river estuaries.

Saint-Victor-sur-Avre (French pronunciation: [sɛ̃ viktɔʁ syʁ avʁ], literally Saint-Victor on Avre) is a commune in the Eure department in Normandy in northern France.

== Population ==
Historical population
Year	Pop.	±% p.a.
1968	57	—
1975	54	−0.77%
1982	57	+0.78%
1990	77	+3.83%
1999	69	−1.21%
2007	64	−0.94%
2012	67	+0.92%
2017	58	−2.84%
2023	54	−1.18%
Source: INSEE

== See also ==
- Communes of the Eure department
