= Armentières-sur-Avre =

- Commune
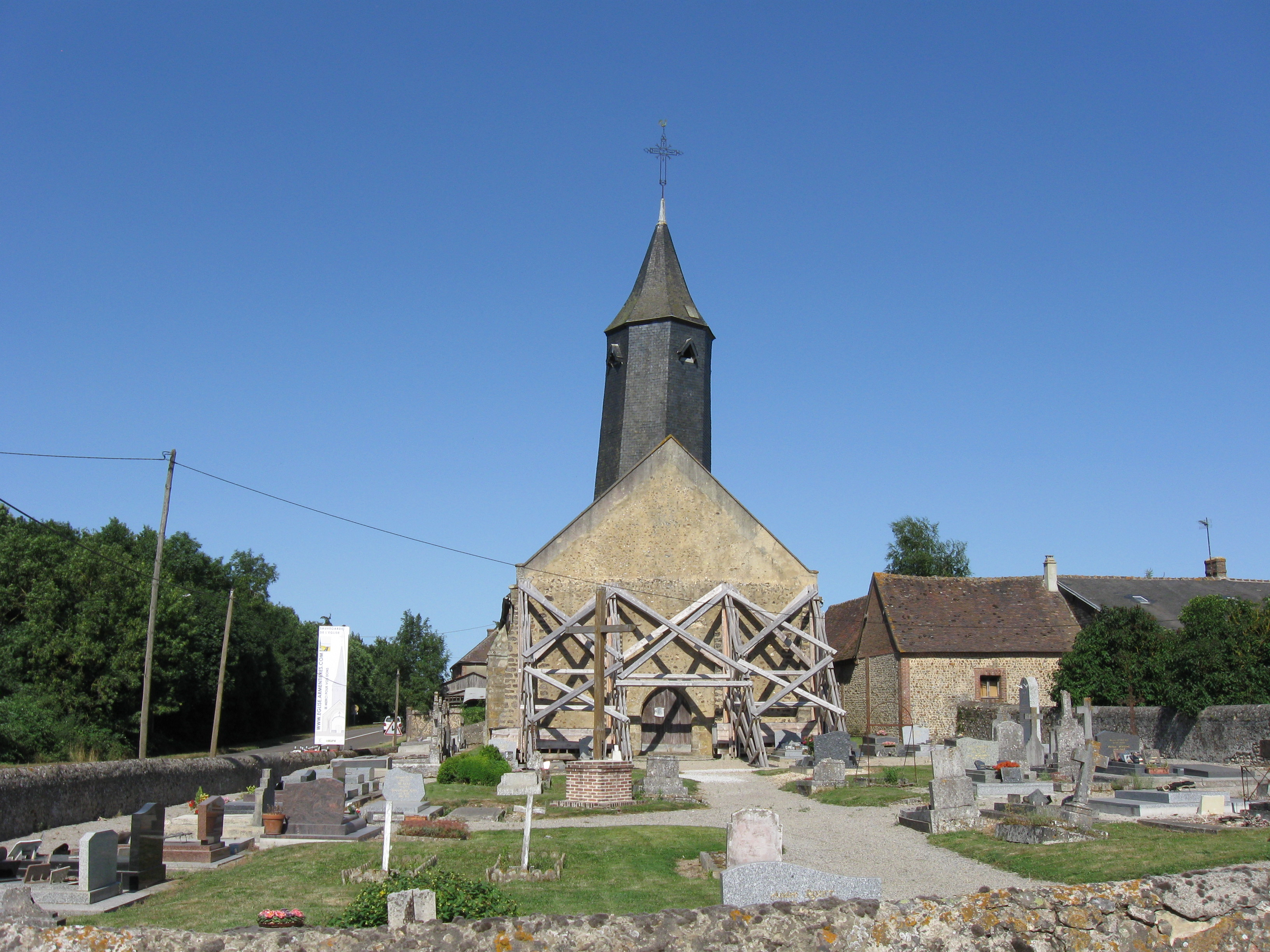
- The church in Armentières-sur-Avre

- Coat of arms
- Location of Armentières-sur-Avre
- Location within France Location within Normandy
- Coordinates: 48°41′06″N 0°48′36″E
- Country: France
- Region: Normandy
- Department: Eure
- Arrondissement: Bernay
- Canton: Verneuil d'Avre et d'Iton
- Intercommunality: CC Interco Normandie Sud Eure

Government
  - Mayor (2020–2026): Damien Brunet
- Area^{1}: 6.11 km^{2} (2.36 sq mi)
- Highest elevation: 208 m (682 ft)
- Lowest elevation: 174 m (571 ft)
- Population (2023): 162
  - Density: 26.5/km^{2} (68.7/sq mi)
- Time zone: UTC+01:00 (CET)
  - Summer (DST): UTC+02:00 (CEST)
- INSEE/Postal code: 27019 /27820
- ^{1} French Land Register data, which excludes lakes, ponds, glaciers > 1 km^{2} (0.386 sq mi or 247 acres) and river estuaries.

Armentières-sur-Avre (French pronunciation: [aʁmɑ̃tjɛʁ syʁ avʁ], literally Armentières on Avre) is a commune in the Eure department in Normandy in northern France.

== Population ==
Historical population
Year	Pop.	±% p.a.
1968	163	—
1975	178	+1.27%
1982	132	−4.18%
1990	142	+0.92%
1999	163	+1.54%
2007	175	+0.89%
2012	185	+1.12%
2017	170	−1.68%
2023	162	−0.80%
Source: INSEE

== See also ==
- Communes of the Eure department
