= Villalet =

- Part of Sylvains-les-Moulins
- Location of Villalet
- Location within France Location within Normandy
- Coordinates: 48°55′52″N 1°03′22″E
- Country: France
- Region: Normandy
- Department: Eure
- Arrondissement: Évreux
- Canton: Verneuil-sur-Avre
- Commune: Sylvains-les-Moulins
- Area^{1}: 2.36 km^{2} (0.91 sq mi)
- Elevation: 124 m (407 ft)
- Highest elevation: 150 m (490 ft)
- Lowest elevation: 104 m (341 ft)
- Population (2013): 88
  - Density: 37/km^{2} (97/sq mi)
- Time zone: UTC+01:00 (CET)
  - Summer (DST): UTC+02:00 (CEST)
- Postal code: 27240
- ^{1} French Land Register data, which excludes lakes, ponds, glaciers > 1 km^{2} (0.386 sq mi or 247 acres) and river estuaries.

Villalet (French pronunciation: [vilalɛ]) is a former commune in the Eure department in Normandy in northern France. On 1 January 2016, it was merged into the commune of Sylvains-les-Moulins.

== See also ==
- Communes of the Eure department
