= Moisville =

- Commune
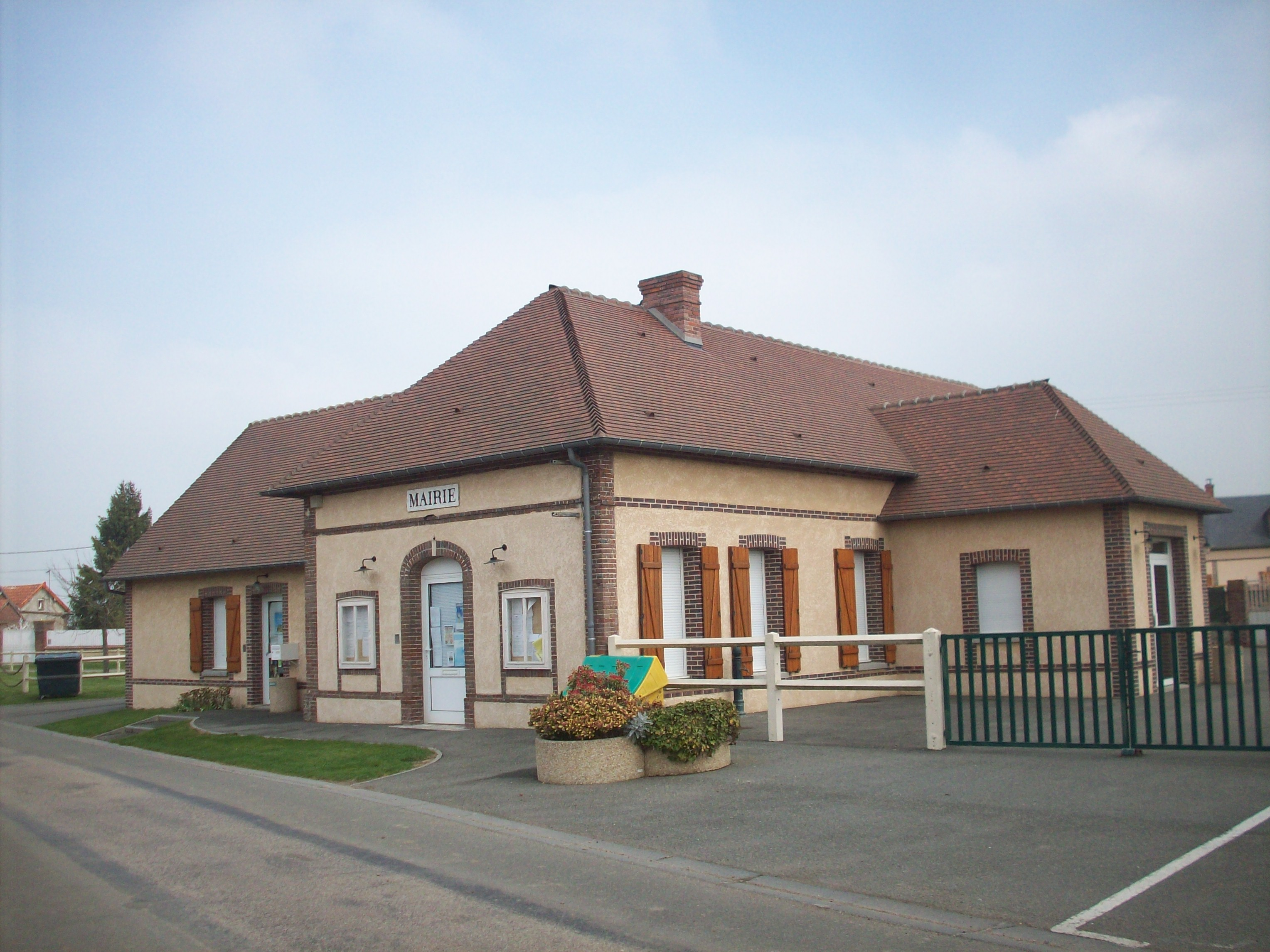
- The town hall in Moisville
- Location of Moisville
- Location within France Location within Normandy
- Coordinates: 48°50′26″N 1°09′56″E
- Country: France
- Region: Normandy
- Department: Eure
- Arrondissement: Évreux
- Canton: Verneuil d'Avre et d'Iton
- Intercommunality: Évreux Portes de Normandie

Government
  - Mayor (2020–2026): Christophe Alory
- Area^{1}: 6.99 km^{2} (2.70 sq mi)
- Elevation: 158 m (518 ft)
- Highest elevation: 159 m (522 ft)
- Lowest elevation: 146 m (479 ft)
- Population (2023): 233
  - Density: 33.3/km^{2} (86.3/sq mi)
- Time zone: UTC+01:00 (CET)
  - Summer (DST): UTC+02:00 (CEST)
- INSEE/Postal code: 27411 /27320
- ^{1} French Land Register data, which excludes lakes, ponds, glaciers > 1 km^{2} (0.386 sq mi or 247 acres) and river estuaries.

Moisville is a commune in the Eure department in Normandy in northern France.

== Population ==
Historical population
Year	Pop.	±% p.a.
1968	158	—
1975	170	+1.05%
1982	148	−1.96%
1990	151	+0.25%
1999	167	+1.13%
2007	201	+2.34%
2012	165	−3.87%
2017	238	+7.60%
2023	233	−0.35%
Source: INSEE

== See also ==
- Communes of the Eure department
