= Courteilles =

- Commune
- Location of Courteilles
- Location within France Location within Normandy
- Coordinates: 48°44′12″N 0°59′26″E
- Country: France
- Region: Normandy
- Department: Eure
- Arrondissement: Bernay
- Canton: Verneuil d'Avre et d'Iton

Government
  - Mayor (2020–2026): Claude Laine
- Area^{1}: 6.24 km^{2} (2.41 sq mi)
- Elevation: 174 m (571 ft)
- Highest elevation: 177 m (581 ft)
- Lowest elevation: 140 m (460 ft)
- Population (2023): 179
  - Density: 28.7/km^{2} (74.3/sq mi)
- Time zone: UTC+01:00 (CET)
  - Summer (DST): UTC+02:00 (CEST)
- INSEE/Postal code: 27182 /27130
- ^{1} French Land Register data, which excludes lakes, ponds, glaciers > 1 km^{2} (0.386 sq mi or 247 acres) and river estuaries.

Courteilles (French pronunciation: [kuʁtɛj]) is a commune in the Eure department in northern France.

== Population ==
Historical population
Year	Pop.	±% p.a.
1968	139	—
1975	156	+1.66%
1982	164	+0.72%
1990	155	−0.70%
1999	165	+0.70%
2007	154	−0.86%
2012	145	−1.20%
2017	148	+0.41%
2023	179	+3.22%
Source: INSEE

== See also ==
- Communes of the Eure department
