= Sylvains-Lès-Moulins =

- Commune
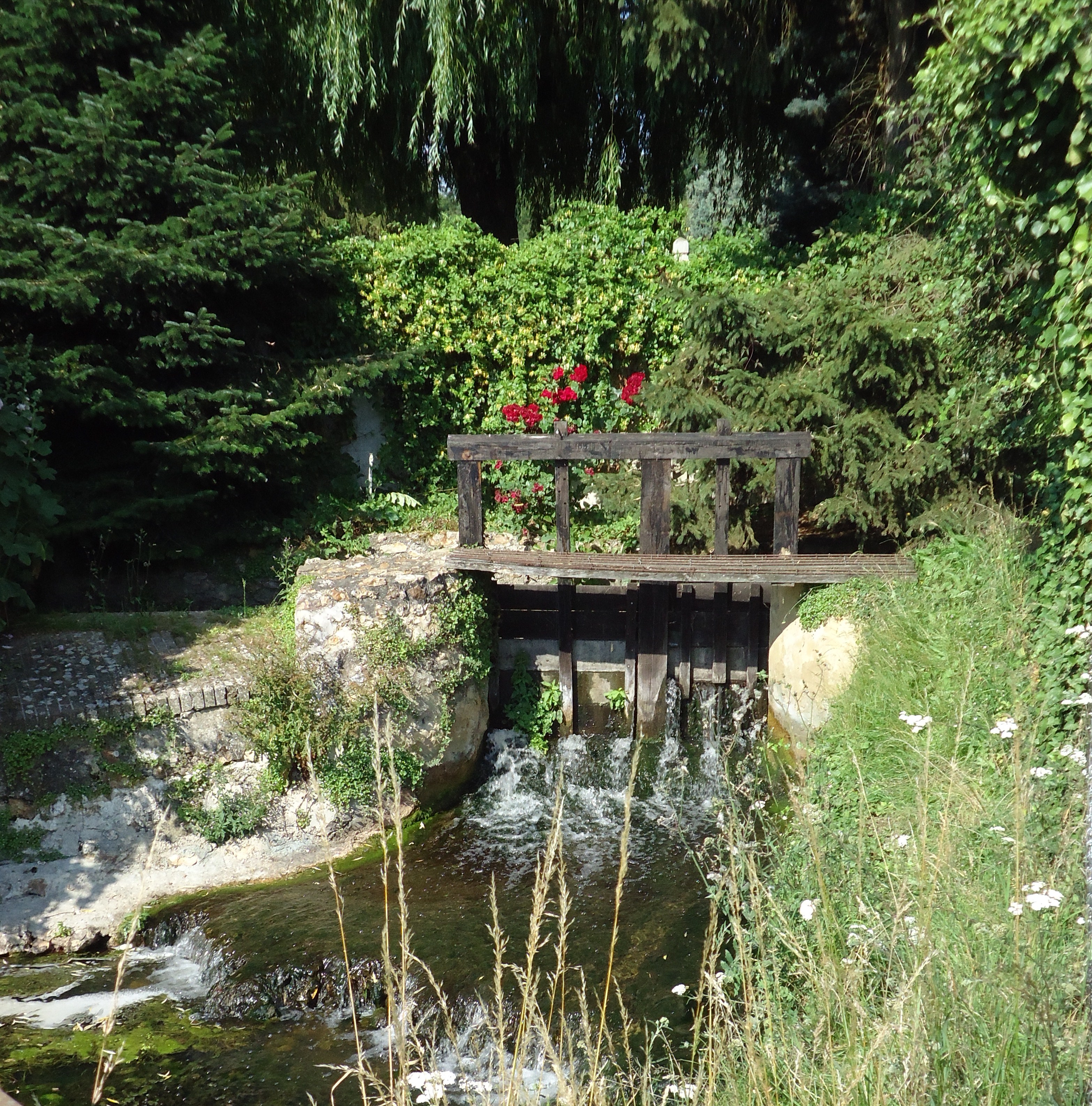
- Part of the mill in Sylvains-Lès-Moulins

- Coat of arms
- Location of Sylvains-Lès-Moulins
- Location within France Location within Normandy
- Coordinates: 48°55′11″N 1°05′26″E
- Country: France
- Region: Normandy
- Department: Eure
- Arrondissement: Bernay
- Canton: Verneuil d'Avre et d'Iton

Government
  - Mayor (2020–2026): Lydie Reber
- Area^{1}: 23.88 km^{2} (9.22 sq mi)
- Elevation: 164 m (538 ft)
- Highest elevation: 159 m (522 ft)
- Lowest elevation: 114 m (374 ft)
- Population (2023): 1,267
  - Density: 53.06/km^{2} (137.4/sq mi)
- Time zone: UTC+01:00 (CET)
  - Summer (DST): UTC+02:00 (CEST)
- INSEE/Postal code: 27693 /27240
- ^{1} French Land Register data, which excludes lakes, ponds, glaciers > 1 km^{2} (0.386 sq mi or 247 acres) and river estuaries.

Sylvains-Lès-Moulins (French pronunciation: [silvɛ̃ lɛ mulɛ̃], also: Sylvains-les-Moulins) is a commune in the Eure department in Normandy in northern France. It was created in 1972 by the merger of the former communes Villez-Champ-Dominel and Coulonges. On 1 January 2016, the former commune Villalet was merged into Sylvains-Lès-Moulins.

== Population ==
Population data refer to the area corresponding with the commune as of January 2025.

Historical population
Year	Pop.	±% p.a.
1968	389	—
1975	498	+3.59%
1982	704	+5.07%
1990	1,013	+4.65%
1999	993	−0.22%
2007	1,194	+2.33%
2012	1,284	+1.46%
2017	1,295	+0.17%
2023	1,267	−0.36%
Source: INSEE

== Personalities ==
- André Couteaux, writer, who adapted Mon oncle Benjamin on screen and wrote the novel Un monsieur de compagnie.
- Claude de Cambronne, French businessman
- Gilbert Renault (1904–1984), French resistant aka Colonel Rémy.

== See also ==
- Communes of the Eure department
