= Bâlines =

- Commune
- Coat of arms
- Location of Bâlines
- Location within France Location within Normandy
- Coordinates: 48°44′37″N 0°58′40″E
- Country: France
- Region: Normandy
- Department: Eure
- Arrondissement: Bernay
- Canton: Verneuil d'Avre et d'Iton

Government
  - Mayor (2020–2026): Max Auffret
- Area^{1}: 3.73 km^{2} (1.44 sq mi)
- Elevation: 169 m (554 ft)
- Highest elevation: 175 m (574 ft)
- Lowest elevation: 149 m (489 ft)
- Population (2023): 545
  - Density: 146/km^{2} (378/sq mi)
- Time zone: UTC+01:00 (CET)
  - Summer (DST): UTC+02:00 (CEST)
- INSEE/Postal code: 27036 /27130
- ^{1} French Land Register data, which excludes lakes, ponds, glaciers > 1 km^{2} (0.386 sq mi or 247 acres) and river estuaries.

Bâlines (French pronunciation: [balin]) is a commune in the Eure department in Normandy in northern France.

In February 2021 the village was the site of a fire in which a house with a thatched roof burned down. The village was home to an animal park called Le Bois des Aigles. The park was the subject of the seizure of 69 birds due to alleged animal-trafficking in January 2018, as of early 2020 no charges had been brought against the operators of the park. The park was forced to close during the 2019 heatwave due to excessive heat. The park was subsequently re-opened in 2020 as Domaine de la forêt enchantée, a halloween-themed amusement attraction.

== Population ==
Historical population
Year	Pop.	±% p.a.
1968	264	—
1975	380	+5.34%
1982	426	+1.65%
1990	421	−0.15%
1999	407	−0.38%
2007	432	+0.75%
2012	504	+3.13%
2017	567	+2.38%
2023	545	−0.66%
Source: INSEE

== See also ==
- Communes of the Eure department
