= Droisy, Eure =

Droisy
- Commune
- Location of Droisy
- Location within France Location within Normandy
- Coordinates: 48°48′25″N 1°08′35″E
- Country: France
- Region: Normandy
- Department: Eure
- Arrondissement: Évreux
- Canton: Verneuil d'Avre et d'Iton
- Intercommunality: Évreux Portes de Normandie

Government
  - Mayor (2020–2026): Francis Biet
- Area^{1}: 17.49 km^{2} (6.75 sq mi)
- Elevation: 149 m (489 ft)
- Highest elevation: 179 m (587 ft)
- Lowest elevation: 137 m (449 ft)
- Population (2023): 455
  - Density: 26.0/km^{2} (67.4/sq mi)
- Time zone: UTC+01:00 (CET)
  - Summer (DST): UTC+02:00 (CEST)
- INSEE/Postal code: 27206 /27320
- ^{1} French Land Register data, which excludes lakes, ponds, glaciers > 1 km^{2} (0.386 sq mi or 247 acres) and river estuaries.

Droisy (French pronunciation: [dʁwazi]) is a commune in the Eure department in northern France. In 1974 it absorbed the former commune Panlatte.

== Population ==
Historical population
Year	Pop.	±% p.a.
1968	200	—
1975	213	+0.90%
1982	241	+1.78%
1990	328	+3.93%
1999	344	+0.53%
2007	392	+1.65%
2012	417	+1.24%
2017	439	+1.03%
2023	455	+0.60%
Source: INSEE

== See also ==
- Communes of the Eure department
