= Chennebrun =

- Commune
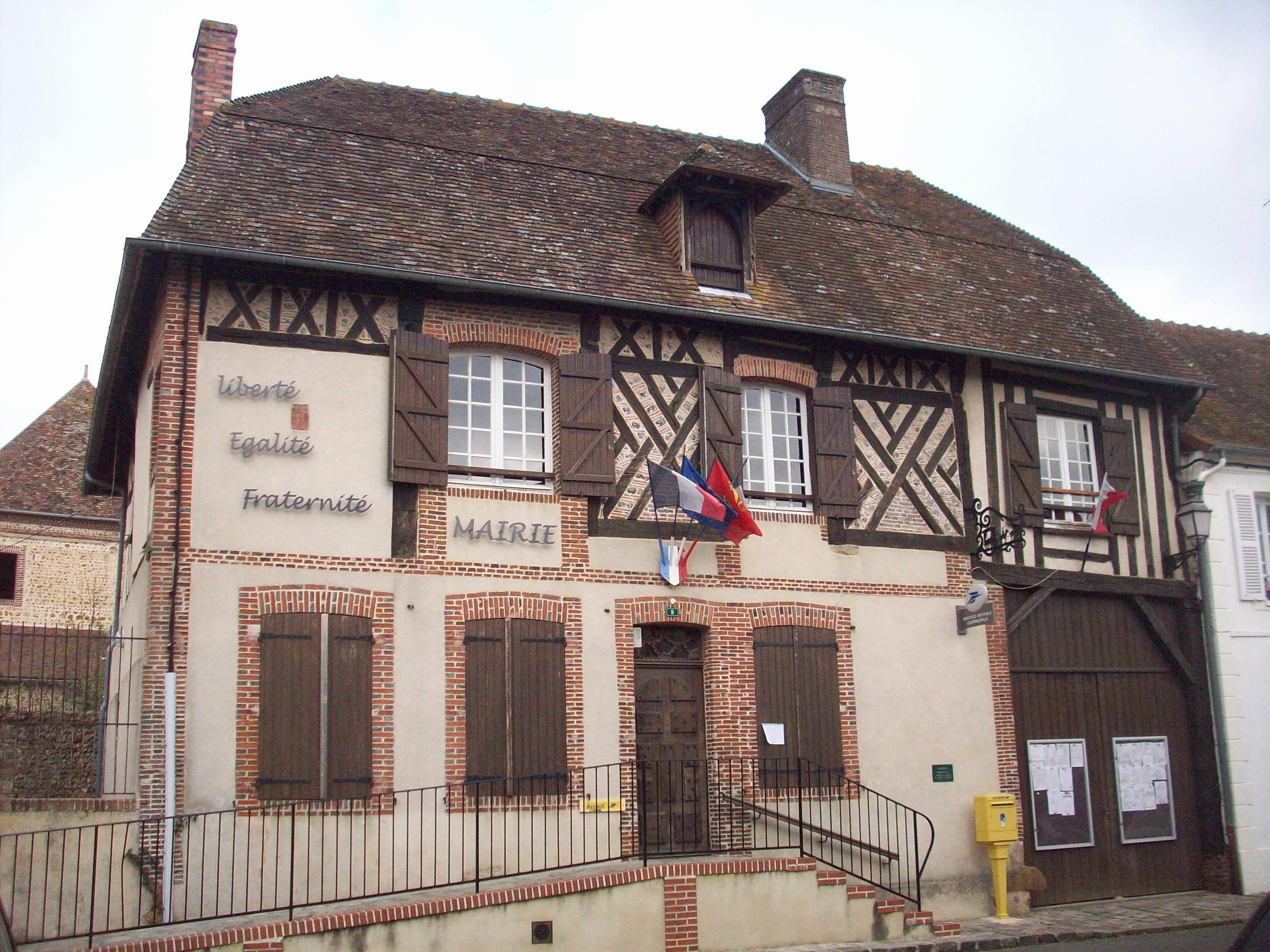
- The town hall in Chennebrun

- Coat of arms
- Location of Chennebrun
- Location within France Location within Normandy
- Coordinates: 48°40′50″N 0°46′58″E
- Country: France
- Region: Normandy
- Department: Eure
- Arrondissement: Bernay
- Canton: Verneuil d'Avre et d'Iton

Government
  - Mayor (2022–2026): Charles Auvray
- Area^{1}: 2.92 km^{2} (1.13 sq mi)
- Elevation: 200 m (660 ft)
- Highest elevation: 219 m (719 ft)
- Lowest elevation: 187 m (614 ft)
- Population (2023): 103
  - Density: 35.3/km^{2} (91.4/sq mi)
- Time zone: UTC+01:00 (CET)
  - Summer (DST): UTC+02:00 (CEST)
- INSEE/Postal code: 27155 /27820
- ^{1} French Land Register data, which excludes lakes, ponds, glaciers > 1 km^{2} (0.386 sq mi or 247 acres) and river estuaries.

Chennebrun (French pronunciation: [ʃɛnəbʁœ̃]) is a commune in the Eure department in northern France.

== Population ==
Historical population
Year	Pop.	±% p.a.
1968	209	—
1975	170	−2.91%
1982	124	−4.41%
1990	142	+1.71%
1999	115	−2.32%
2007	128	+1.35%
2012	132	+0.62%
2017	109	−3.76%
2023	103	−0.94%
Source: INSEE

== See also ==
- Communes of the Eure department
- Château de Chennebrun
