= Piseux =

- Commune
- Coat of arms
- Location of Piseux
- Location within France Location within Normandy
- Coordinates: 48°46′27″N 0°58′34″E
- Country: France
- Region: Normandy
- Department: Eure
- Arrondissement: Bernay
- Canton: Verneuil d'Avre et d'Iton

Government
  - Mayor (2020–2026): Sophie Delhome
- Area^{1}: 19.63 km^{2} (7.58 sq mi)
- Elevation: 176 m (577 ft)
- Highest elevation: 182 m (597 ft)
- Lowest elevation: 163 m (535 ft)
- Population (2023): 675
  - Density: 34.4/km^{2} (89.1/sq mi)
- Time zone: UTC+01:00 (CET)
  - Summer (DST): UTC+02:00 (CEST)
- INSEE/Postal code: 27457 /27130
- ^{1} French Land Register data, which excludes lakes, ponds, glaciers > 1 km^{2} (0.386 sq mi or 247 acres) and river estuaries.

Piseux (French pronunciation: [pizø]) is a commune in the Eure department in Normandy in northern France.

== Population ==
Historical population
Year	Pop.	±% p.a.
1968	515	—
1975	505	−0.28%
1982	509	+0.11%
1990	569	+1.40%
1999	536	−0.66%
2007	657	+2.58%
2012	688	+0.93%
2017	744	+1.58%
2023	675	−1.61%
Source: INSEE

== See also ==
- Communes of the Eure department
