= Mandres, Eure =

Mandres
- Commune
- Coat of arms
- Location of Mandres
- Location within France Location within Normandy
- Coordinates: 48°45′14″N 0°52′07″E
- Country: France
- Region: Normandy
- Department: Eure
- Arrondissement: Bernay
- Canton: Verneuil d'Avre et d'Iton

Government
  - Mayor (2020–2026): Michel Osmond
- Area^{1}: 11.79 km^{2} (4.55 sq mi)
- Elevation: 188 m (617 ft)
- Highest elevation: 213 m (699 ft)
- Lowest elevation: 177 m (581 ft)
- Population (2023): 348
  - Density: 29.5/km^{2} (76.4/sq mi)
- Time zone: UTC+01:00 (CET)
  - Summer (DST): UTC+02:00 (CEST)
- INSEE/Postal code: 27383 /27130
- ^{1} French Land Register data, which excludes lakes, ponds, glaciers > 1 km^{2} (0.386 sq mi or 247 acres) and river estuaries.

Mandres (French pronunciation: [mɑ̃dʁ]) is a commune in the Eure department in Normandy in northern France.

== Population ==
Historical population
Year	Pop.	±% p.a.
1968	184	—
1975	237	+3.68%
1982	284	+2.62%
1990	376	+3.57%
1999	342	−1.05%
2007	353	+0.40%
2012	351	−0.11%
2017	373	+1.22%
2023	348	−1.15%
Source: INSEE

== See also ==
- Communes of the Eure department
