= Château de Chennebrun =

Castle in Eure, Normandy, France

Coordinates: 48.6808°N 0.7828°E

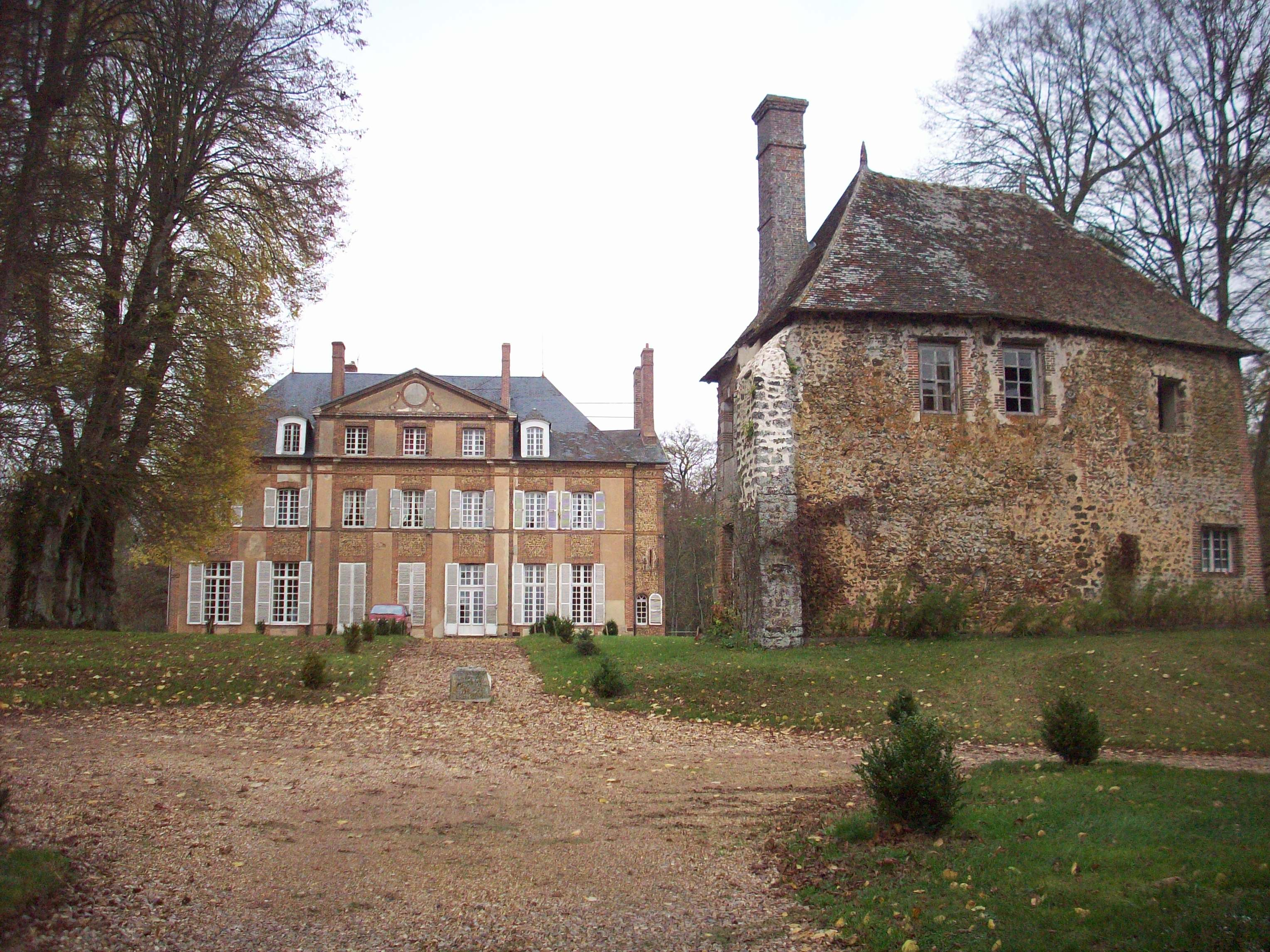
Château de Chennebrun in 2011

Château de Chennebrun is a castle in Chennebrun, Eure, France.

The current castle was built in the 17th century. It replaced an earlier castle on the site.

The French slighted the castle in 1168. King Henry I of England retaliated in 1169, slighted the French castle at Châteauneuf.
