= Pullay =

- Commune
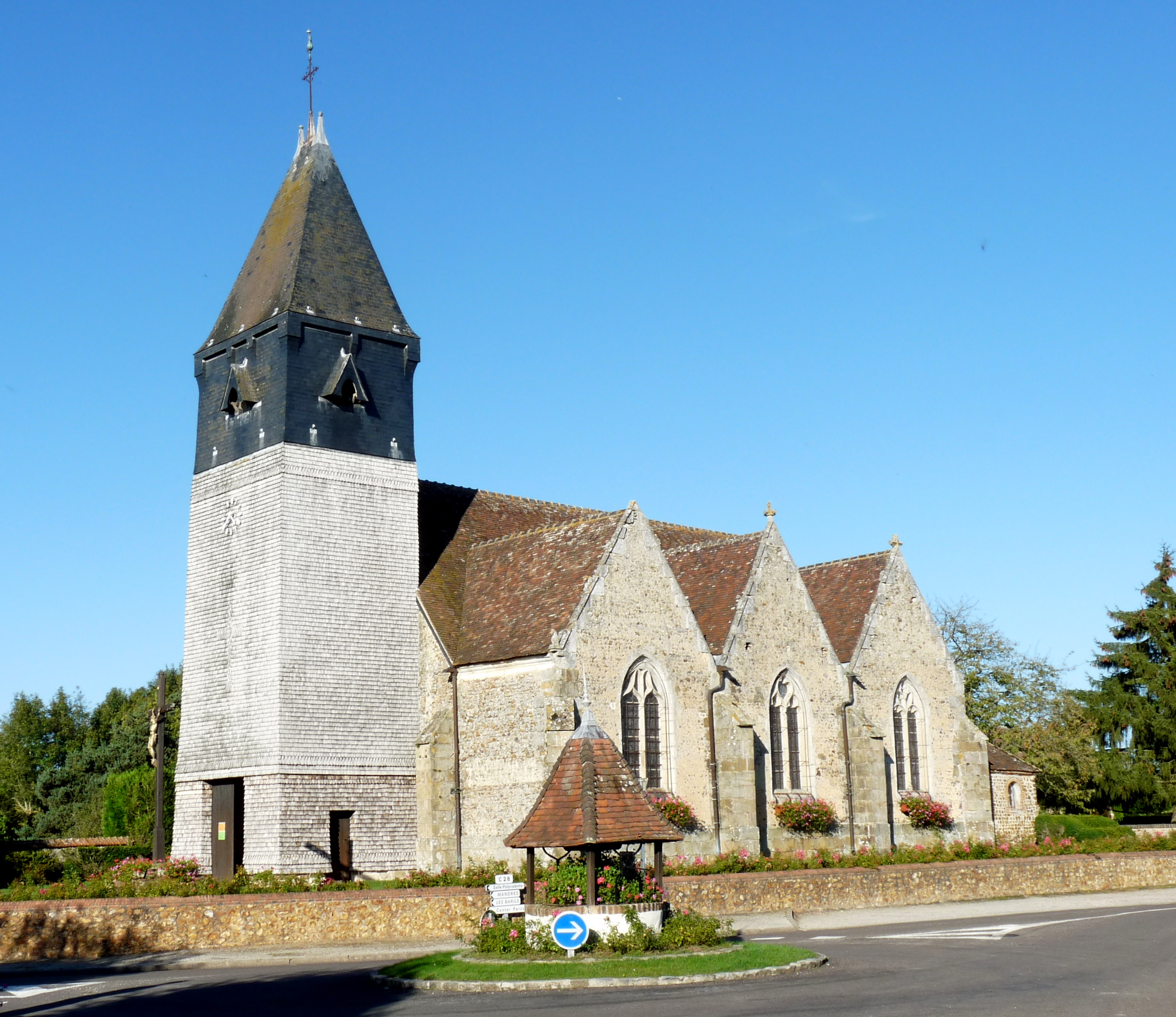
- The church in Pullay

- Coat of arms
- Location of Pullay
- Location within France Location within Normandy
- Coordinates: 48°43′55″N 0°52′37″E
- Country: France
- Region: Normandy
- Department: Eure
- Arrondissement: Bernay
- Canton: Verneuil d'Avre et d'Iton

Government
  - Mayor (2020–2026): Serge Souchay
- Area^{1}: 12.03 km^{2} (4.64 sq mi)
- Elevation: 180 m (590 ft)
- Highest elevation: 198 m (650 ft)
- Lowest elevation: 167 m (548 ft)
- Population (2023): 381
  - Density: 31.7/km^{2} (82.0/sq mi)
- Time zone: UTC+01:00 (CET)
  - Summer (DST): UTC+02:00 (CEST)
- INSEE/Postal code: 27481 /27130
- ^{1} French Land Register data, which excludes lakes, ponds, glaciers > 1 km^{2} (0.386 sq mi or 247 acres) and river estuaries.

Pullay (French pronunciation: [pylɛ]) is a commune in the Eure department in Normandy in northern France.

== Population ==
Historical population
Year	Pop.	±% p.a.
1968	237	—
1975	246	+0.53%
1982	304	+3.07%
1990	328	+0.95%
1999	353	+0.82%
2007	370	+0.59%
2012	394	+1.26%
2017	400	+0.30%
2023	381	−0.81%
Source: INSEE

== See also ==
- Communes of the Eure department
