= Saint-Germain-sur-Avre =

- Commune
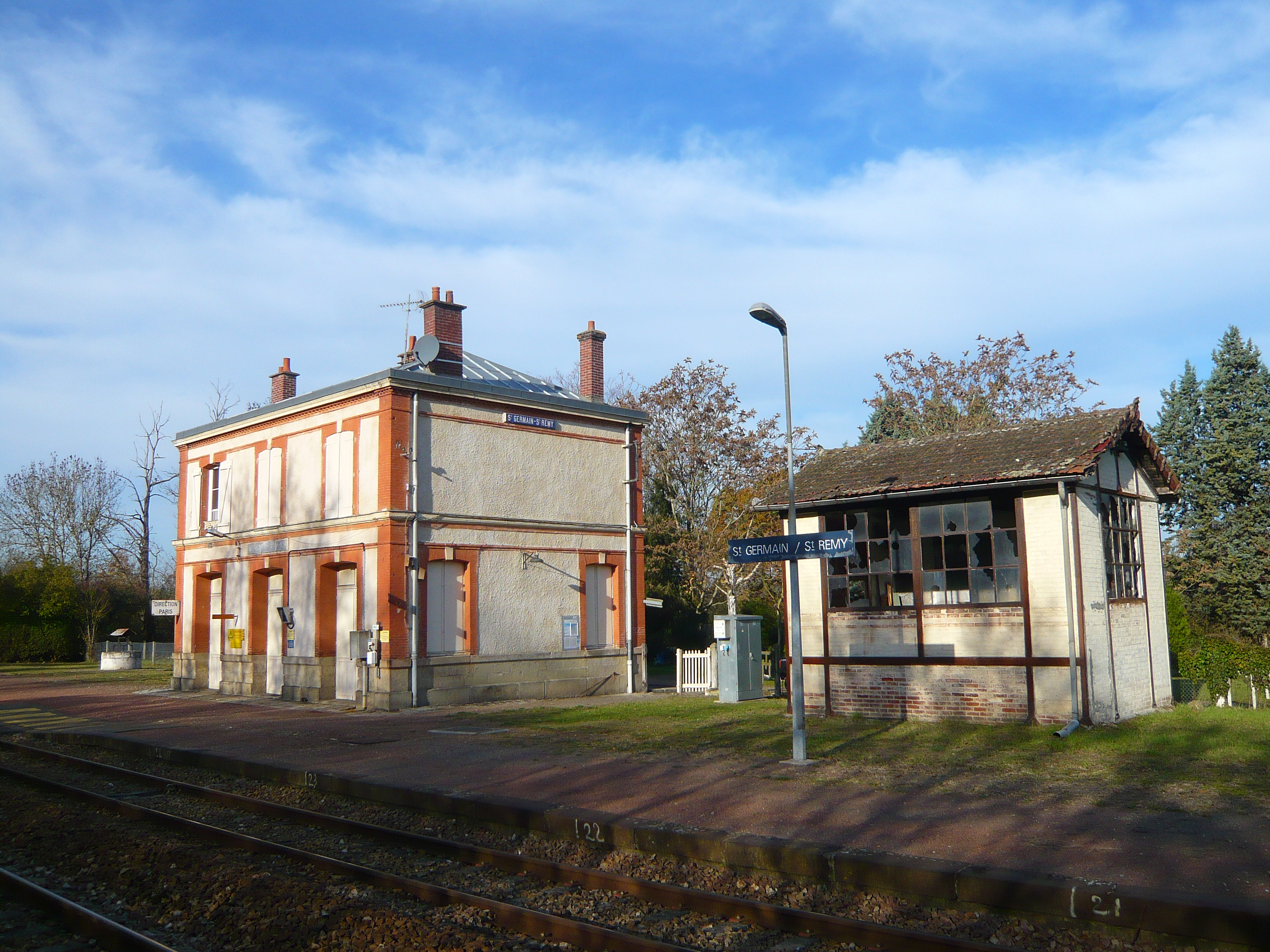
- The railway station of Saint-Germain/Saint-Rémy

- Coat of arms
- Location of Saint-Germain-sur-Avre
- Location within France Location within Normandy
- Coordinates: 48°45′57″N 1°15′46″E
- Country: France
- Region: Normandy
- Department: Eure
- Arrondissement: Évreux
- Canton: Verneuil d'Avre et d'Iton
- Intercommunality: Évreux Portes de Normandie

Government
  - Mayor (2020–2026): Francis Gautier
- Area^{1}: 5.39 km^{2} (2.08 sq mi)
- Elevation: 98 m (322 ft)
- Highest elevation: 140 m (460 ft)
- Lowest elevation: 88 m (289 ft)
- Population (2023): 1,195
  - Density: 222/km^{2} (574/sq mi)
- Time zone: UTC+01:00 (CET)
  - Summer (DST): UTC+02:00 (CEST)
- INSEE/Postal code: 27548 /27320
- ^{1} French Land Register data, which excludes lakes, ponds, glaciers > 1 km^{2} (0.386 sq mi or 247 acres) and river estuaries.

Saint-Germain-sur-Avre (French pronunciation: [sɛ̃ ʒɛʁmɛ̃ syʁ avʁ]) is a commune in the Eure department in Normandy in north western France.

== Population ==
Historical population
Year	Pop.	±% p.a.
1968	336	—
1975	464	+4.72%
1982	665	+5.28%
1990	1,026	+5.57%
1999	1,128	+1.06%
2007	1,207	+0.85%
2012	1,218	+0.18%
2017	1,177	−0.68%
2023	1,195	+0.25%
Source: INSEE

== See also ==
- Communes of the Eure department
