= Les Barils =

- Commune
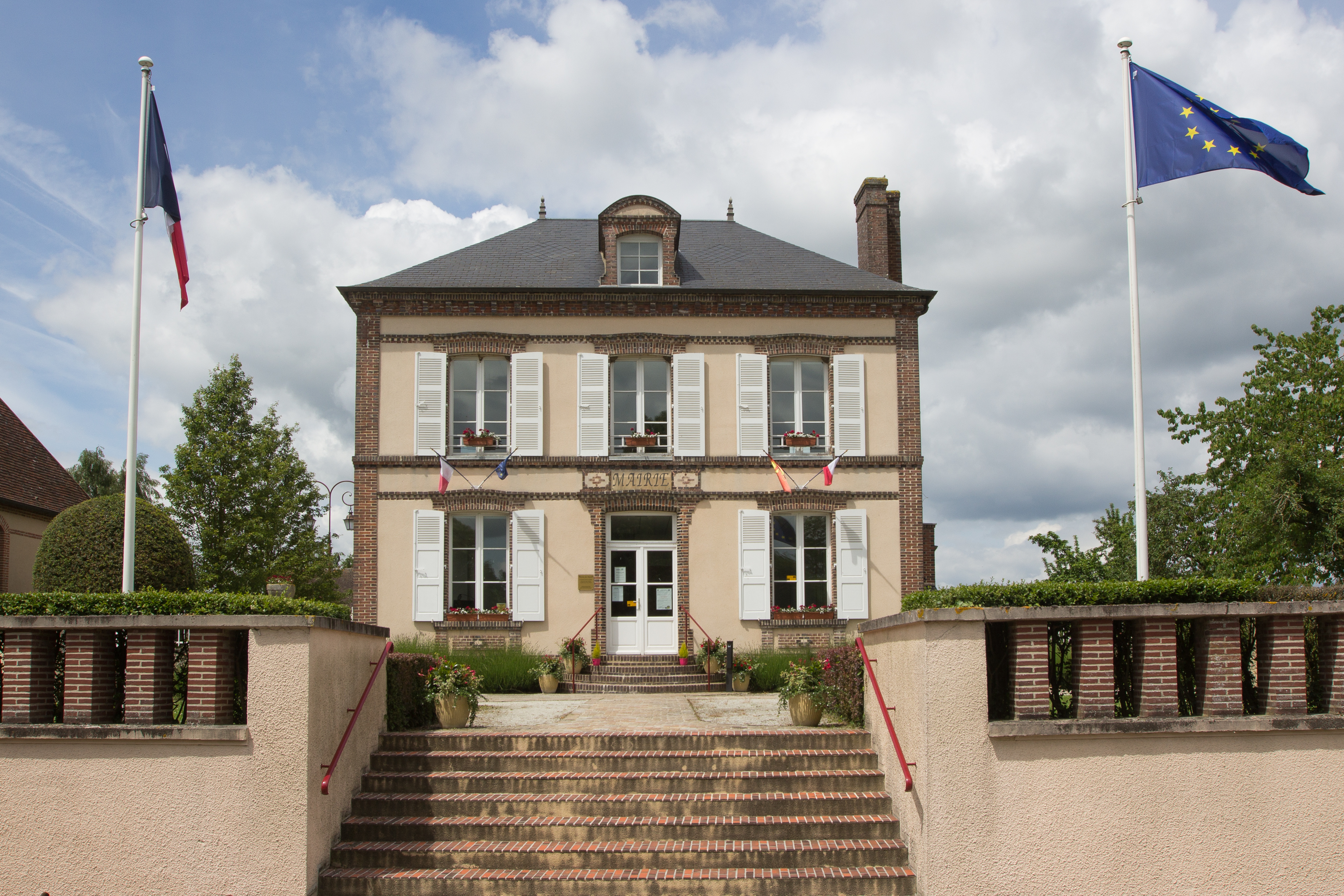
- The town hall in Les Barils
- Location of Les Barils
- Location within France Location within Normandy
- Coordinates: 48°43′57″N 0°49′13″E
- Country: France
- Region: Normandy
- Department: Eure
- Arrondissement: Bernay
- Canton: Verneuil d'Avre et d'Iton
- Intercommunality: Normandie Sud Eure

Government
  - Mayor (2020–2026): Philippe Obadia
- Area^{1}: 9.53 km^{2} (3.68 sq mi)
- Elevation: 202 m (663 ft)
- Highest elevation: 216 m (709 ft)
- Lowest elevation: 178 m (584 ft)
- Population (2023): 270
  - Density: 28/km^{2} (73/sq mi)
- Time zone: UTC+01:00 (CET)
  - Summer (DST): UTC+02:00 (CEST)
- INSEE/Postal code: 27038 /27130
- ^{1} French Land Register data, which excludes lakes, ponds, glaciers > 1 km^{2} (0.386 sq mi or 247 acres) and river estuaries.

Les Barils (French pronunciation: [le baʁil]) is a commune in the Eure department in Normandy in northern France.

== Population ==
Historical population
Year	Pop.	±% p.a.
1968	202	—
1975	186	−1.17%
1982	177	−0.71%
1990	178	+0.07%
1999	164	−0.91%
2007	161	−0.23%
2012	207	+5.15%
2017	269	+5.38%
2023	270	+0.06%
Source: INSEE

== See also ==
- Communes of the Eure department
