= Marcilly-la-Campagne =

- Commune
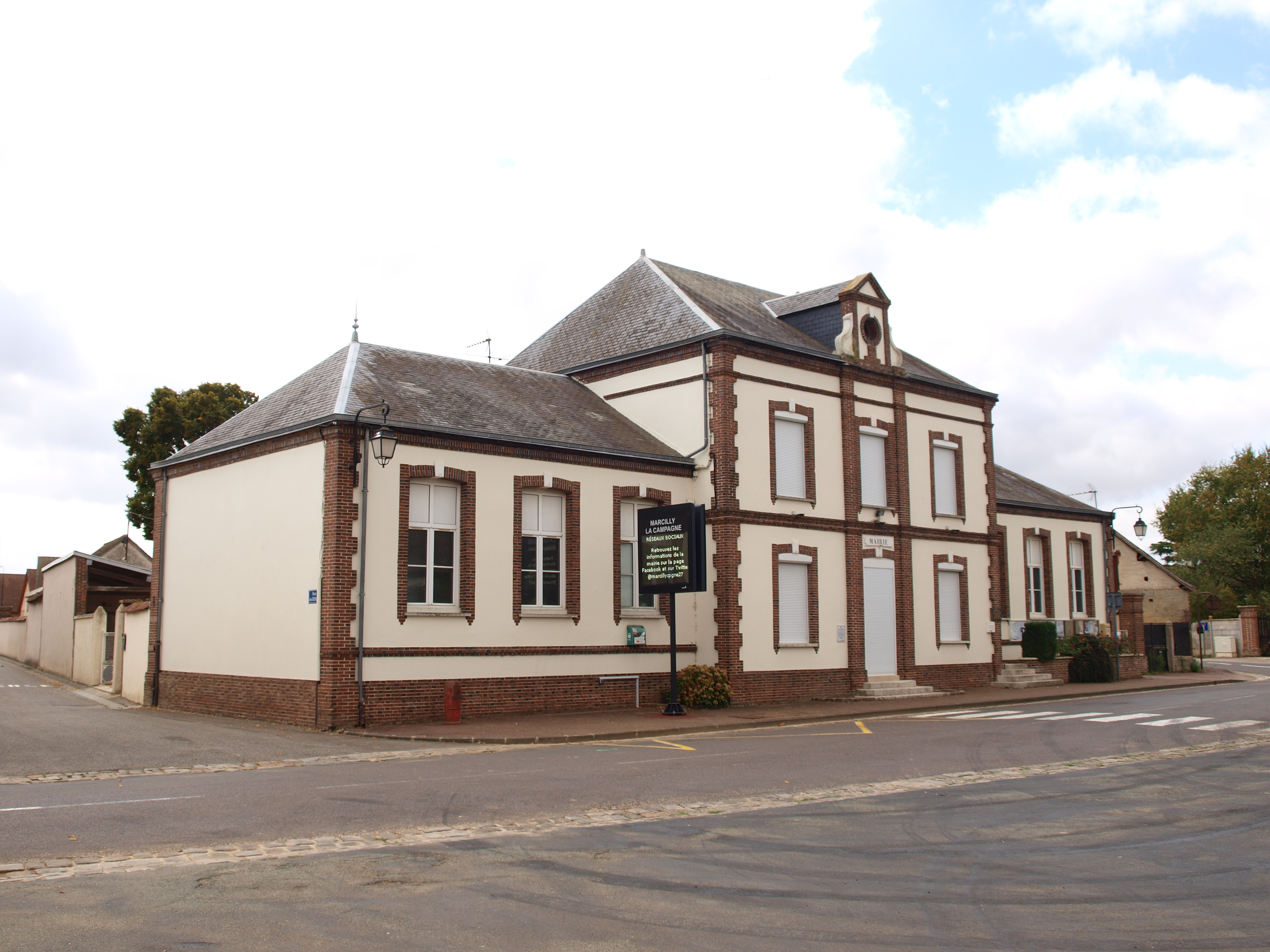
- The town hall in Marcilly-la-Campagne
- Location of Marcilly-la-Campagne
- Location within France Location within Normandy
- Coordinates: 48°50′05″N 1°12′06″E
- Country: France
- Region: Normandy
- Department: Eure
- Arrondissement: Évreux
- Canton: Verneuil d'Avre et d'Iton
- Intercommunality: Évreux Portes de Normandie

Government
  - Mayor (2020–2026): Jean-Paul Herouard
- Area^{1}: 19.5 km^{2} (7.5 sq mi)
- Elevation: 141 m (463 ft)
- Highest elevation: 158 m (518 ft)
- Lowest elevation: 128 m (420 ft)
- Population (2023): 1,118
  - Density: 57.3/km^{2} (148/sq mi)
- Time zone: UTC+01:00 (CET)
  - Summer (DST): UTC+02:00 (CEST)
- INSEE/Postal code: 27390 /27320
- ^{1} French Land Register data, which excludes lakes, ponds, glaciers > 1 km^{2} (0.386 sq mi or 247 acres) and river estuaries.

Marcilly-la-Campagne (French pronunciation: [maʁsiji la kɑ̃paɲ]) is a commune in the Eure department in Normandy in northern France.

== Population ==
Historical population
Year	Pop.	±% p.a.
1968	455	—
1975	408	−1.55%
1982	475	+2.20%
1990	672	+4.43%
1999	705	+0.53%
2007	915	+3.31%
2012	1,066	+3.10%
2017	1,161	+1.72%
2023	1,118	−0.63%
Source: INSEE

== See also ==
- Communes of the Eure department
