= Saint-Lubin-des-Joncherets =

- Commune
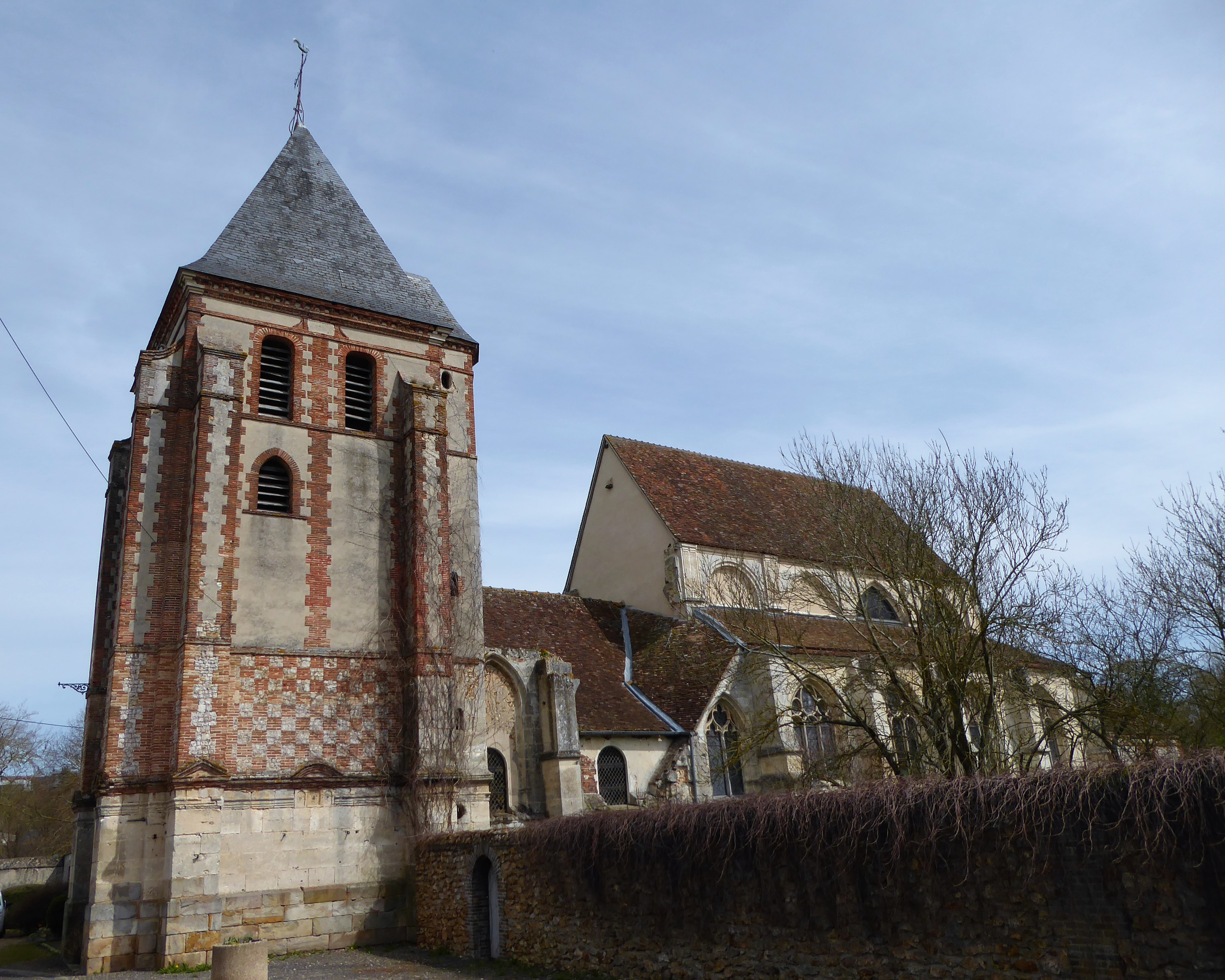
- The church in Saint-Lubin-des-Joncherets
- Location of Saint-Lubin-des-Joncherets
- Location within France Location within Centre-Val de Loire
- Coordinates: 48°46′N 1°11′E
- Country: France
- Region: Centre-Val de Loire
- Department: Eure-et-Loir
- Arrondissement: Dreux
- Canton: Saint-Lubin-des-Joncherets
- Intercommunality: CA Pays de Dreux

Government
  - Mayor (2020–2026): Pascal Artechea
- Area^{1}: 14.46 km^{2} (5.58 sq mi)
- Elevation: 101 m (331 ft)
- Highest elevation: 171 m (561 ft)
- Lowest elevation: 97 m (318 ft)
- Population (2023): 4,116
  - Density: 284.6/km^{2} (737.2/sq mi)
- Time zone: UTC+01:00 (CET)
  - Summer (DST): UTC+02:00 (CEST)
- INSEE/Postal code: 28348 /28350
- ^{1} French Land Register data, which excludes lakes, ponds, glaciers > 1 km^{2} (0.386 sq mi or 247 acres) and river estuaries.

Saint-Lubin-des-Joncherets (French pronunciation: [sɛ̃ lybɛ̃ de ʒɔ̃ʃʁɛ]) is a commune in the Eure-et-Loir department in northern France. It is located close to the Avre river and the border with the Eure department.

== Population ==
Historical population
| Year | Pop. | ±% p.a. |
|---|---|---|
| 1968 | 1,882 | — |
| 1975 | 2,304 | +2.93% |
| 1982 | 3,586 | +6.52% |
| 1990 | 4,403 | +2.60% |
| 1999 | 4,355 | −0.12% |
| 2007 | 3,972 | −1.14% |
| 2012 | 4,162 | +0.94% |
| 2017 | 3,995 | −0.82% |
| 2023 | 4,116 | +0.50% |
Source: INSEE

== See also ==
- Communes of the Eure-et-Loir department
