= Avrilly, Eure =

Avrilly
- Part of Chambois
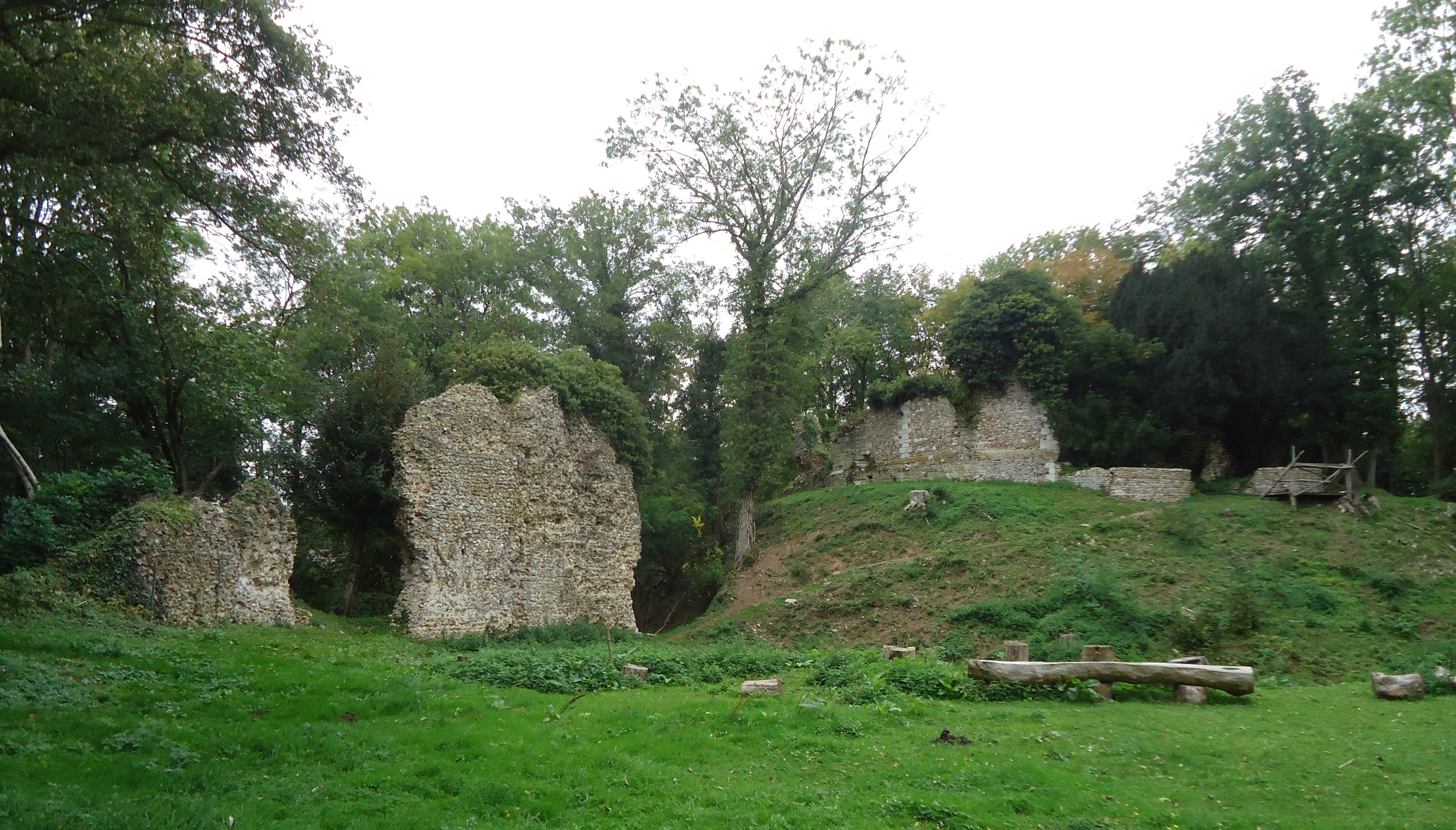
- Ruins of the chateau
- Location of Avrilly
- Location within France Location within Normandy
- Coordinates: 48°55′51″N 1°08′41″E
- Country: France
- Region: Normandy
- Department: Eure
- Arrondissement: Bernay
- Canton: Verneuil-sur-Avre
- Commune: Chambois
- Area^{1}: 7.19 km^{2} (2.78 sq mi)
- Elevation: 112 m (367 ft)
- Highest elevation: 159 m (522 ft)
- Lowest elevation: 137 m (449 ft)
- Population (2018): 428
  - Density: 59.5/km^{2} (154/sq mi)
- Time zone: UTC+01:00 (CET)
  - Summer (DST): UTC+02:00 (CEST)
- Postal code: 27240
- ^{1} French Land Register data, which excludes lakes, ponds, glaciers > 1 km^{2} (0.386 sq mi or 247 acres) and river estuaries.

Avrilly is a former commune in the Eure department in Normandy in northern France. On 1 January 2016, it was merged into the new commune of Chambois.

== See also ==
- Communes of the Eure department
