= Bourth =

- Commune
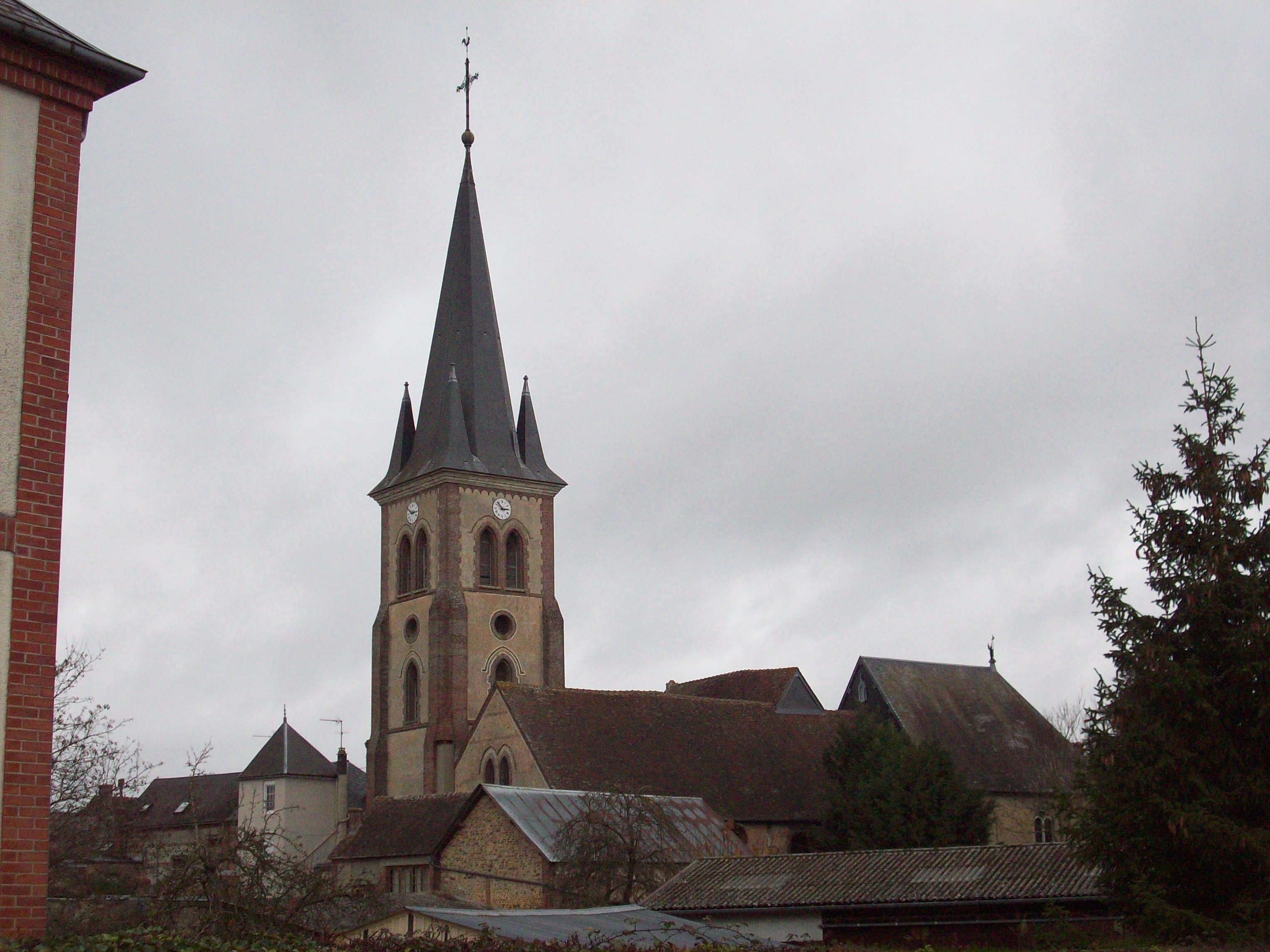
- The church in Bourth

- Coat of arms
- Location of Bourth
- Location within France Location within Normandy
- Coordinates: 48°46′15″N 0°48′30″E
- Country: France
- Region: Normandy
- Department: Eure
- Arrondissement: Bernay
- Canton: Verneuil d'Avre et d'Iton

Government
  - Mayor (2024–2026): Alain Rochefort
- Area^{1}: 18.63 km^{2} (7.19 sq mi)
- Elevation: 198 m (650 ft)
- Highest elevation: 217 m (712 ft)
- Lowest elevation: 179 m (587 ft)
- Population (2023): 1,191
  - Density: 63.93/km^{2} (165.6/sq mi)
- Time zone: UTC+01:00 (CET)
  - Summer (DST): UTC+02:00 (CEST)
- INSEE/Postal code: 27108 /27580
- ^{1} French Land Register data, which excludes lakes, ponds, glaciers > 1 km^{2} (0.386 sq mi or 247 acres) and river estuaries.

Bourth (French pronunciation: [buʁt]) is a commune in the Eure department in Normandy in northern France.

== Population ==
Historical population
Year	Pop.	±% p.a.
1968	1,070	—
1975	1,074	+0.05%
1982	1,013	−0.83%
1990	1,064	+0.62%
1999	1,124	+0.61%
2007	1,204	+0.86%
2012	1,265	+0.99%
2017	1,255	−0.16%
2023	1,191	−0.87%
Source: INSEE

== See also ==
- Communes of the Eure department
