= Chambois, Eure =

Chambois
- Commune
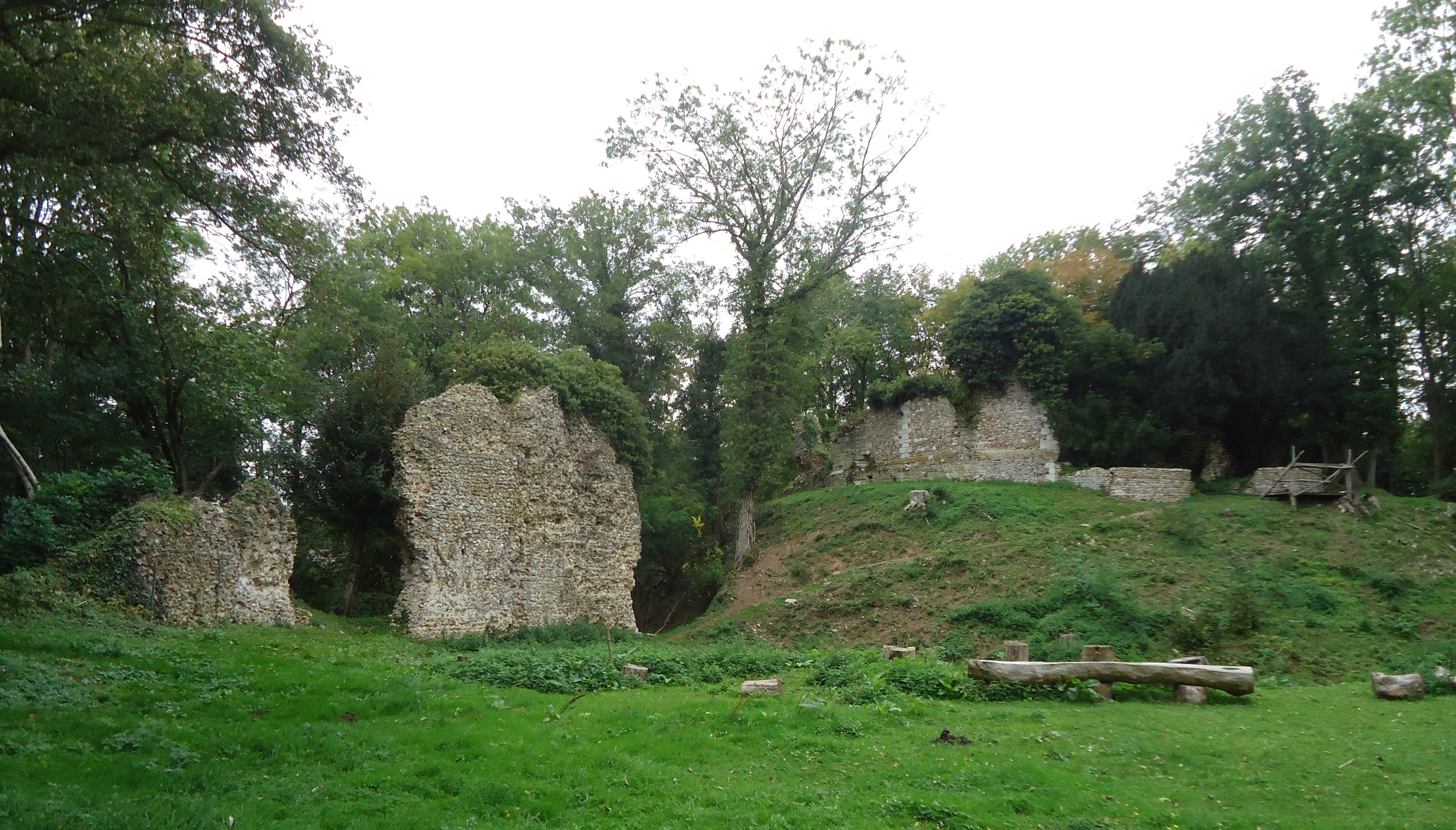
- The motte and castle ruins in Avrilly
- Location of Chambois
- Location within France Location within Normandy
- Coordinates: 48°55′48″N 1°08′31″E
- Country: France
- Region: Normandy
- Department: Eure
- Arrondissement: Bernay
- Canton: Verneuil d'Avre et d'Iton

Government
  - Mayor (2020–2026): Laurent Baissas
- Area^{1}: 27.60 km^{2} (10.66 sq mi)
- Population (2023): 1,322
  - Density: 47.90/km^{2} (124.1/sq mi)
- Time zone: UTC+01:00 (CET)
  - Summer (DST): UTC+02:00 (CEST)
- INSEE/Postal code: 27032 /27240
- ^{1} French Land Register data, which excludes lakes, ponds, glaciers > 1 km^{2} (0.386 sq mi or 247 acres) and river estuaries.

Chambois (French pronunciation: [ʃɑ̃bwa]) is a commune in the department of Eure, northern France. The municipality was established on 1 January 2016 by merger of the former communes of Avrilly, Corneuil and Thomer-la-Sôgne.

== See also ==
- Communes of the Eure department
