= Gournay-le-Guérin =

- Commune
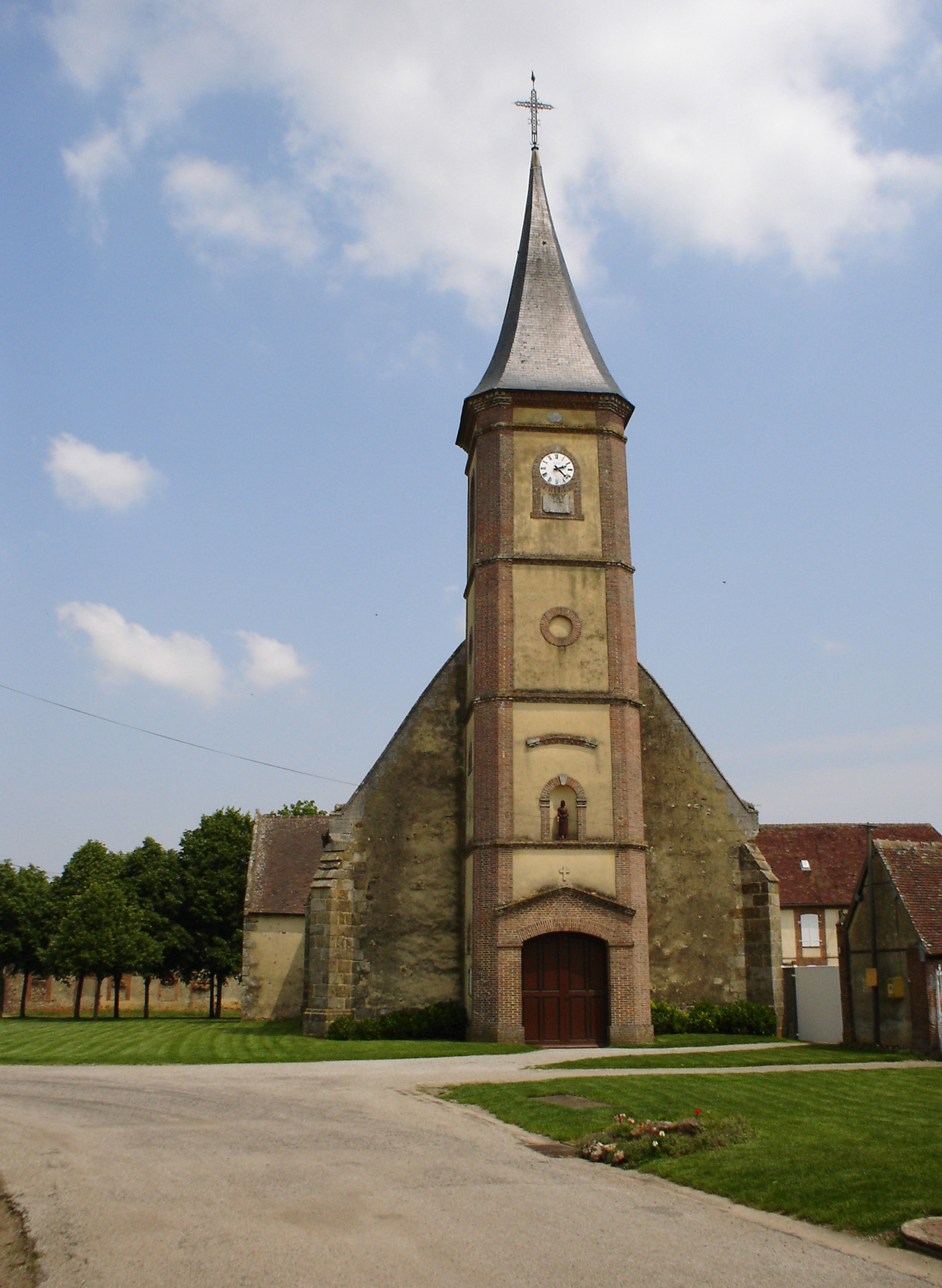
- The church of Saint-Lambert in Gournay-le-Guérin
- Location of Gournay-le-Guérin
- Location within France Location within Normandy
- Coordinates: 48°42′29″N 0°46′33″E
- Country: France
- Region: Normandy
- Department: Eure
- Arrondissement: Bernay
- Canton: Verneuil d'Avre et d'Iton

Government
  - Mayor (2020–2026): Jules Privé
- Area^{1}: 12.27 km^{2} (4.74 sq mi)
- Elevation: 210 m (690 ft)
- Highest elevation: 227 m (745 ft)
- Lowest elevation: 188 m (617 ft)
- Population (2023): 118
  - Density: 9.62/km^{2} (24.9/sq mi)
- Time zone: UTC+01:00 (CET)
  - Summer (DST): UTC+02:00 (CEST)
- INSEE/Postal code: 27291 /27580
- ^{1} French Land Register data, which excludes lakes, ponds, glaciers > 1 km^{2} (0.386 sq mi or 247 acres) and river estuaries.

Gournay-le-Guérin (French pronunciation: [ɡuʁnɛ lə ɡeʁɛ̃]) is a commune in the Eure department in northern France.

== Population ==
Historical population
Year	Pop.	±% p.a.
1968	147	—
1975	159	+1.13%
1982	133	−2.52%
1990	136	+0.28%
1999	138	+0.16%
2007	154	+1.38%
2012	137	−2.31%
2017	132	−0.74%
2023	118	−1.85%
Source: INSEE

== See also ==
- Communes of the Eure department
