= Courdemanche, Eure =

Courdemanche
- Commune
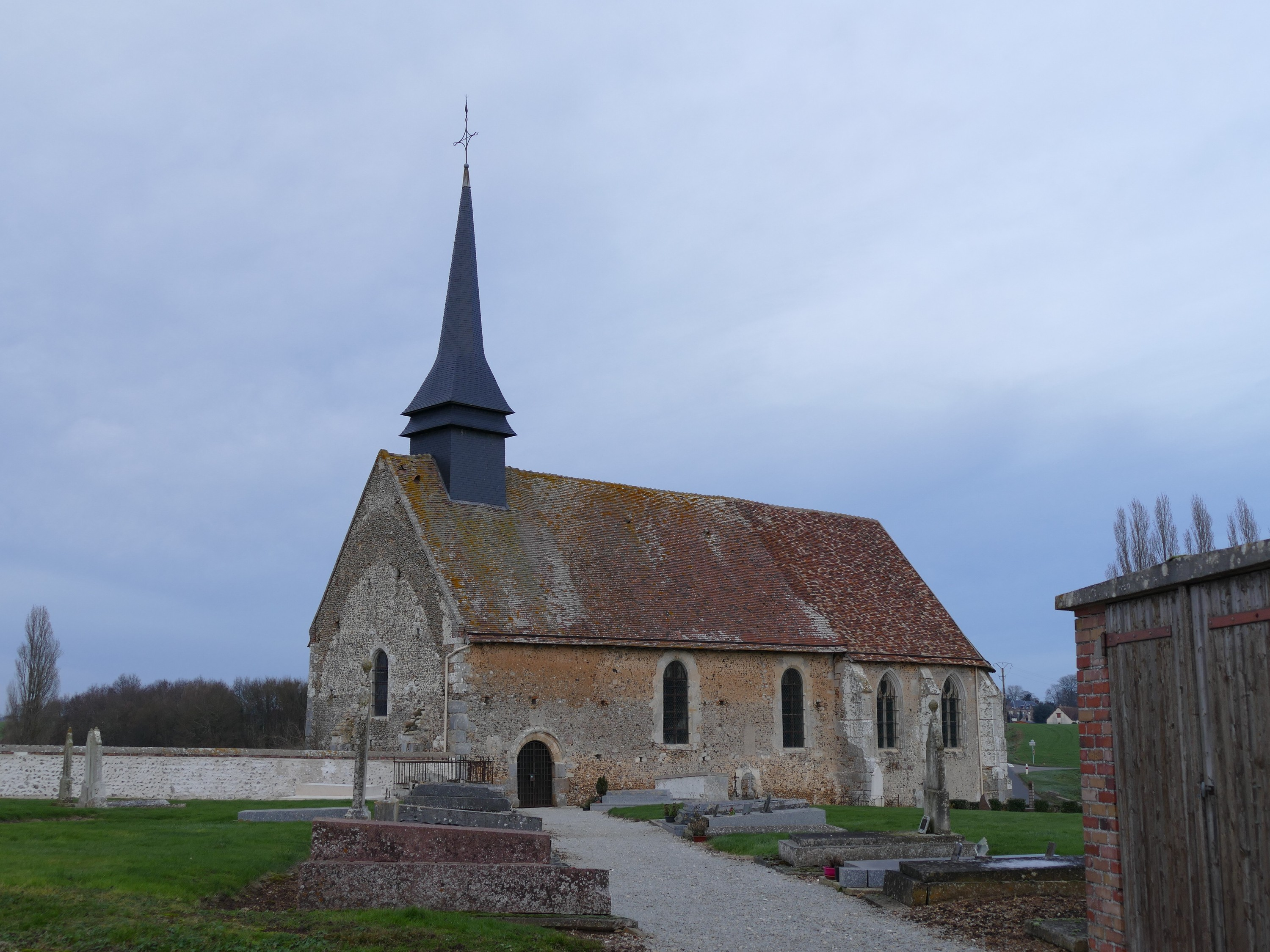
- The church in Courdemanche
- Location of Courdemanche
- Location within France Location within Normandy
- Coordinates: 48°48′10″N 1°15′51″E
- Country: France
- Region: Normandy
- Department: Eure
- Arrondissement: Évreux
- Canton: Verneuil d'Avre et d'Iton
- Intercommunality: Évreux Portes de Normandie

Government
  - Mayor (2020–2026): Jocelyne Néant
- Area^{1}: 8.99 km^{2} (3.47 sq mi)
- Elevation: 136 m (446 ft)
- Highest elevation: 142 m (466 ft)
- Lowest elevation: 110 m (360 ft)
- Population (2023): 590
  - Density: 66/km^{2} (170/sq mi)
- Time zone: UTC+01:00 (CET)
  - Summer (DST): UTC+02:00 (CEST)
- INSEE/Postal code: 27181 /27320
- ^{1} French Land Register data, which excludes lakes, ponds, glaciers > 1 km^{2} (0.386 sq mi or 247 acres) and river estuaries.

Courdemanche (French pronunciation: [kuʁdəmɑ̃ʃ]) is a commune in the Eure department in northern France.

== Population ==
Historical population
| Year | Pop. | ±% p.a. |
|---|---|---|
| 1968 | 190 | — |
| 1975 | 223 | +2.31% |
| 1982 | 298 | +4.23% |
| 1990 | 462 | +5.63% |
| 1999 | 479 | +0.40% |
| 2007 | 530 | +1.27% |
| 2012 | 603 | +2.61% |
| 2017 | 597 | −0.20% |
| 2023 | 590 | −0.20% |
Source: INSEE

== See also ==
- Communes of the Eure department
