= Francheville, Eure =

Francheville
- Part of Verneuil d'Avre et d'Iton
- Location of Francheville
- Location within France Location within Normandy
- Coordinates: 48°47′19″N 0°51′03″E
- Country: France
- Region: Normandy
- Department: Eure
- Arrondissement: Bernay
- Canton: Breteuil
- Commune: Verneuil d'Avre et d'Iton
- Area^{1}: 24.03 km^{2} (9.28 sq mi)
- Elevation: 190 m (620 ft)
- Highest elevation: 197 m (646 ft)
- Lowest elevation: 173 m (568 ft)
- Population (2022): 1,147
  - Density: 47.73/km^{2} (123.6/sq mi)
- Time zone: UTC+01:00 (CET)
  - Summer (DST): UTC+02:00 (CEST)
- Postal code: 27160
- ^{1} French Land Register data, which excludes lakes, ponds, glaciers > 1 km^{2} (0.386 sq mi or 247 acres) and river estuaries.

Francheville (French pronunciation: [fʁɑ̃ʃvil]) is a former commune in the Eure department in the Normandy region in northern France. On 1 January 2017, it was merged into the new commune Verneuil d'Avre et d'Iton.

== Population ==
Historical population
| Year | Pop. | ±% p.a. |
|---|---|---|
| 1962 | 984 | — |
| 1968 | 868 | −2.07% |
| 1975 | 826 | −0.71% |
| 1982 | 836 | +0.17% |
| 1990 | 947 | +1.57% |
| 1999 | 1,151 | +2.19% |
| 2006 | 1,223 | +0.87% |
| 2022 | 1,147 | −0.40% |
Source: EHESS and INSEE

== See also ==
- Communes of the Eure department
