= Canton of Verneuil d'Avre et d'Iton =

Coordinates: 48.74°N 0.93°E

The canton of Verneuil d'Avre et d'Iton (before March 2020: canton of Verneuil-sur-Avre) is an administrative division of the Eure department, northern France. Its borders were modified at the French canton reorganisation which came into effect in March 2015. Its seat is in Verneuil d'Avre et d'Iton.

It consists of the following communes:

1. Acon
2. Armentières-sur-Avre
3. Bâlines
4. Les Barils
5. Bourth
6. Breux-sur-Avre
7. Chambois
8. Chennebrun
9. Courdemanche
10. Courteilles
11. Droisy
12. Gournay-le-Guérin
13. L'Hosmes
14. Illiers-l'Évêque
15. La Madeleine-de-Nonancourt
16. Mandres
17. Marcilly-la-Campagne
18. Mesnils-sur-Iton (partly)
19. Moisville
20. Nonancourt
21. Piseux
22. Pullay
23. Saint-Christophe-sur-Avre
24. Saint-Germain-sur-Avre
25. Saint-Victor-sur-Avre
26. Sylvains-Lès-Moulins
27. Tillières-sur-Avre
28. Verneuil d'Avre et d'Iton (partly)
