= Avre (Eure) =

River in France

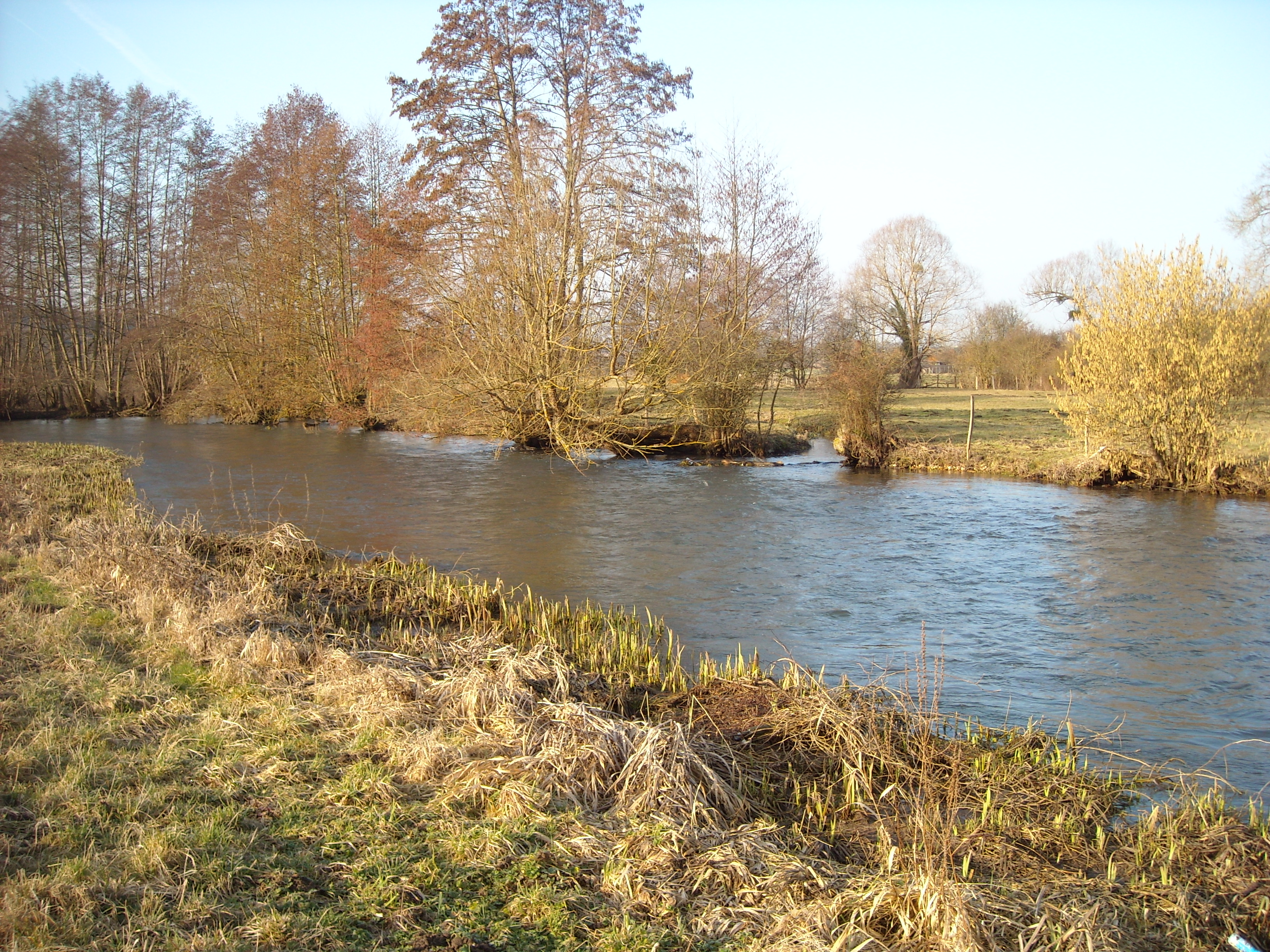

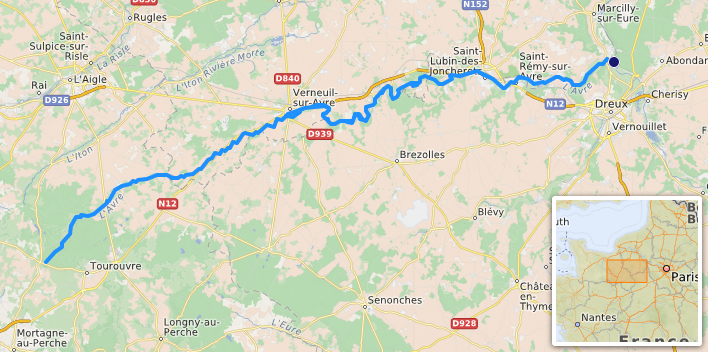

- Location within France Location within Normandy

Location
- Country: France

Physical characteristics
- Source
  - location: Orne
  - elevation: 280 m (920 ft)
- Mouth
  - location: Eure
  - coordinates: 48°46′51″N 1°22′30″E
- Length: 80 km (50 mi)
- Basin size: 917 km^{2} (354 sq mi)
- Discharge
  - average: 4.5 m^{3}/s (160 cu ft/s)

Basin features
- Progression: Eure→ Seine→ English Channel

The Avre (French pronunciation: [avʁ]) is a river in France and a left tributary of the river Eure. It is 80.4 km (50.0 mi) long, and its watershed extends to 917 km^{2}.

== Background ==
The headwaters are in the Perche forest in Orne, in the commune of Tourouvre au Perche. It is 280m above sea level and joins with the Eure near Dreux and forms the border between the Eure and Eure-et-Loir départements.

The Avre flows through the Orne, Eure-et-Loir and Eure départments and historically forms part of the border of Normandy.

== Gallery ==
Avre, from source to mouth

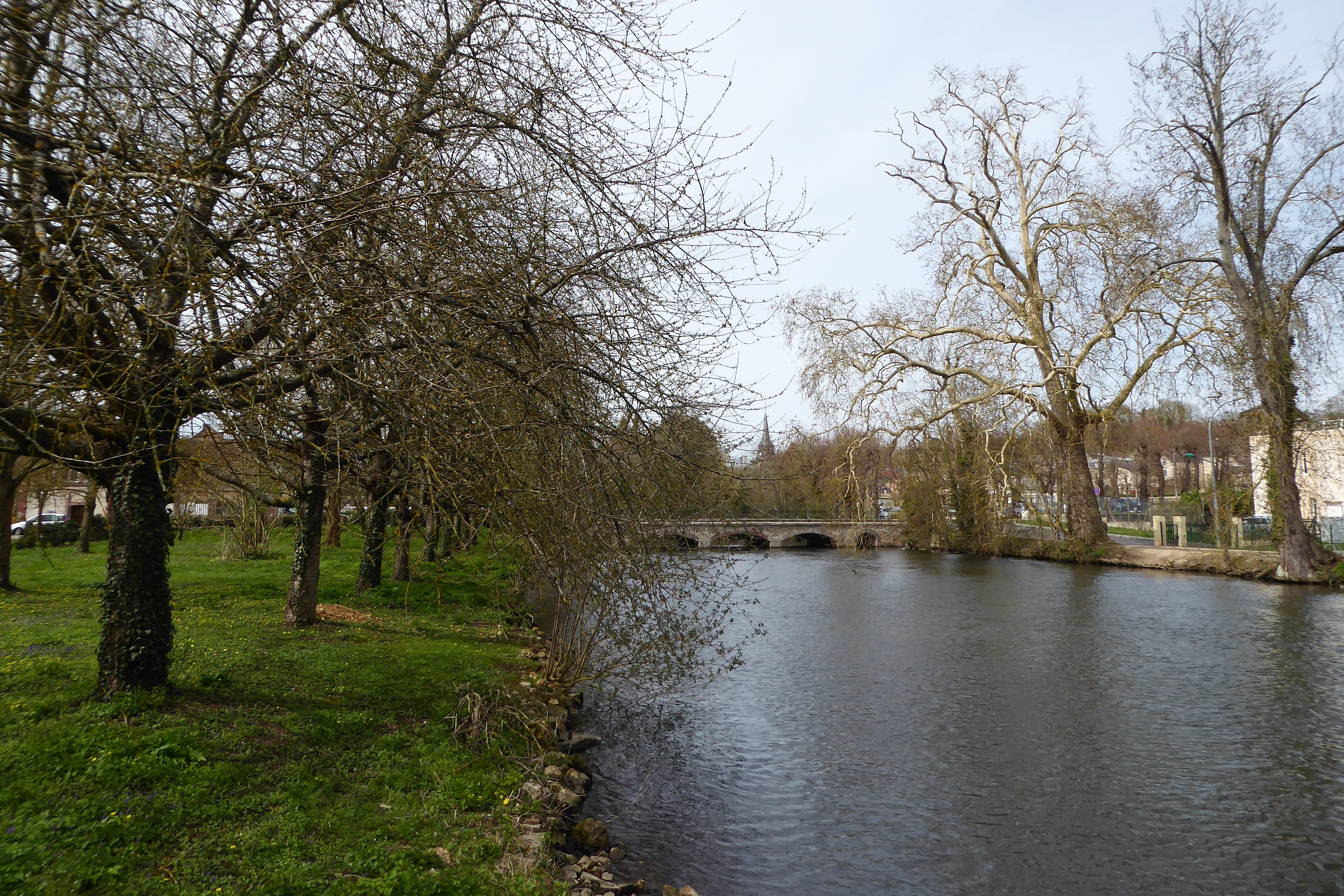
Saint-Lubin-des-Joncherets
Eure-et-Loir department

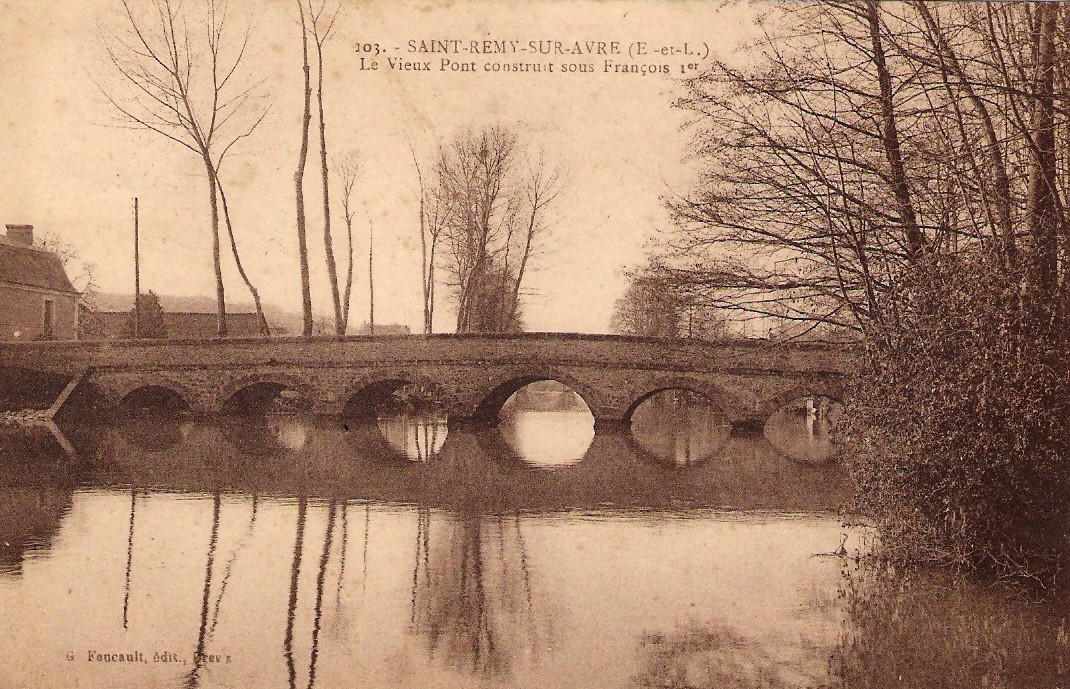
Saint-Rémy-sur-Avre
"The old bridge, built during Francis I of France reign" (1494-1547).
