= Évreux =

Prefecture and commune in Normandy, France

- Prefecture and commune
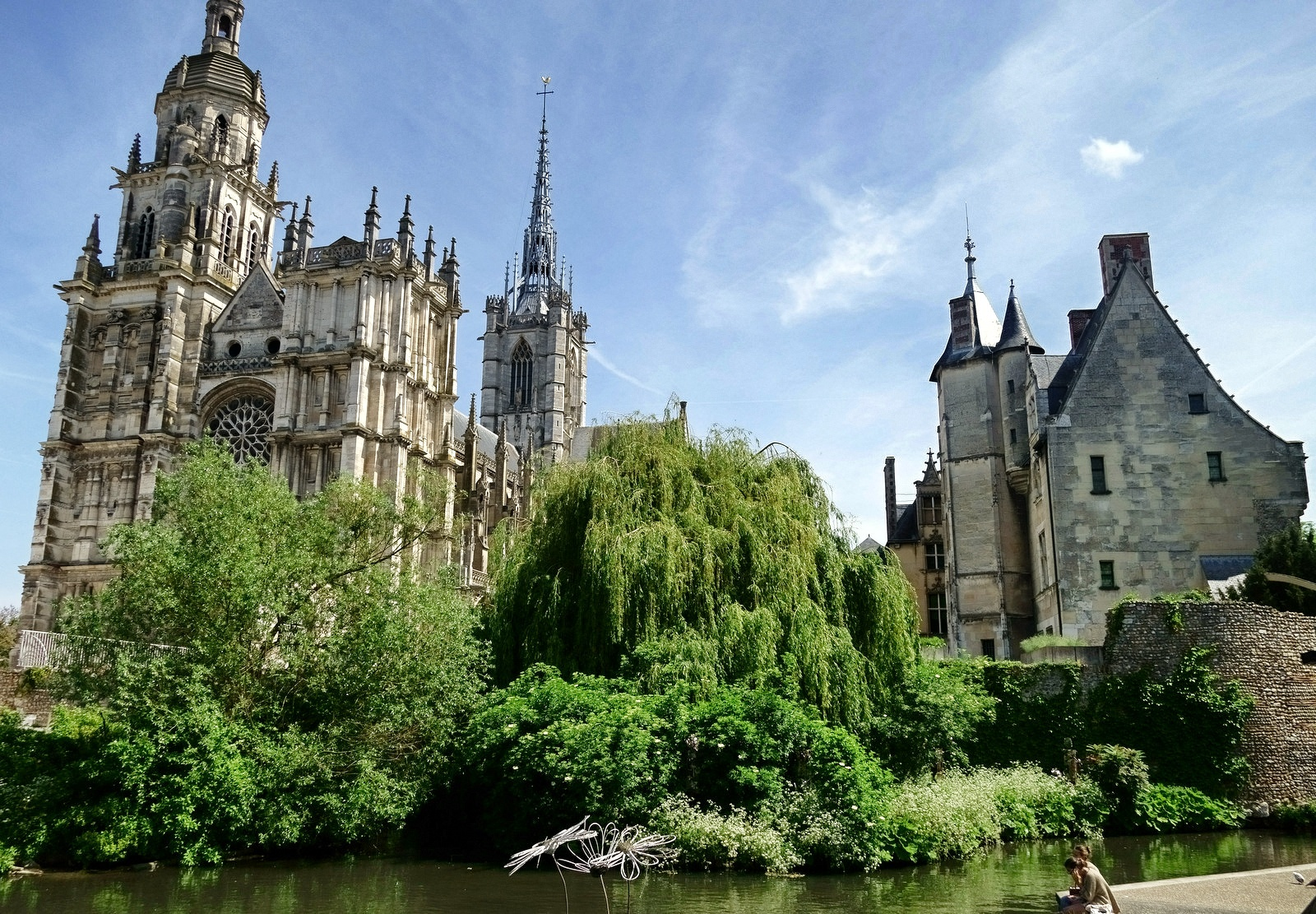
- Évreux Cathedral and Iton River

- Coat of arms
- Location of Évreux
- Location within France Location within Normandy
- Coordinates: 49°01′N 1°09′E
- Country: France
- Region: Normandy
- Department: Eure
- Arrondissement: Évreux
- Canton: Évreux-1, 2 and 3
- Intercommunality: CA Évreux Portes de Normandie

Government
  - Mayor (2020–2026): Guy Lefrand (DVD)
- Area^{1}: 26.45 km^{2} (10.21 sq mi)
- Elevation: 92 m (302 ft)
- Highest elevation: 146 m (479 ft)
- Lowest elevation: 58 m (190 ft)
- Population (2023): 49,360
  - Density: 1,866/km^{2} (4,833/sq mi)
- Demonym: Ébroïciens
- Time zone: UTC+01:00 (CET)
  - Summer (DST): UTC+02:00 (CEST)
- INSEE/Postal code: 27229 /27000
- Website: evreux.fr
- ^{1} French Land Register data, which excludes lakes, ponds, glaciers > 1 km^{2} (0.386 sq mi or 247 acres) and river estuaries.

Évreux (French pronunciation: [evʁø]) is a commune in and the prefecture of the department of Eure, in the French region of Normandy.

== History ==
=== Antiquity ===
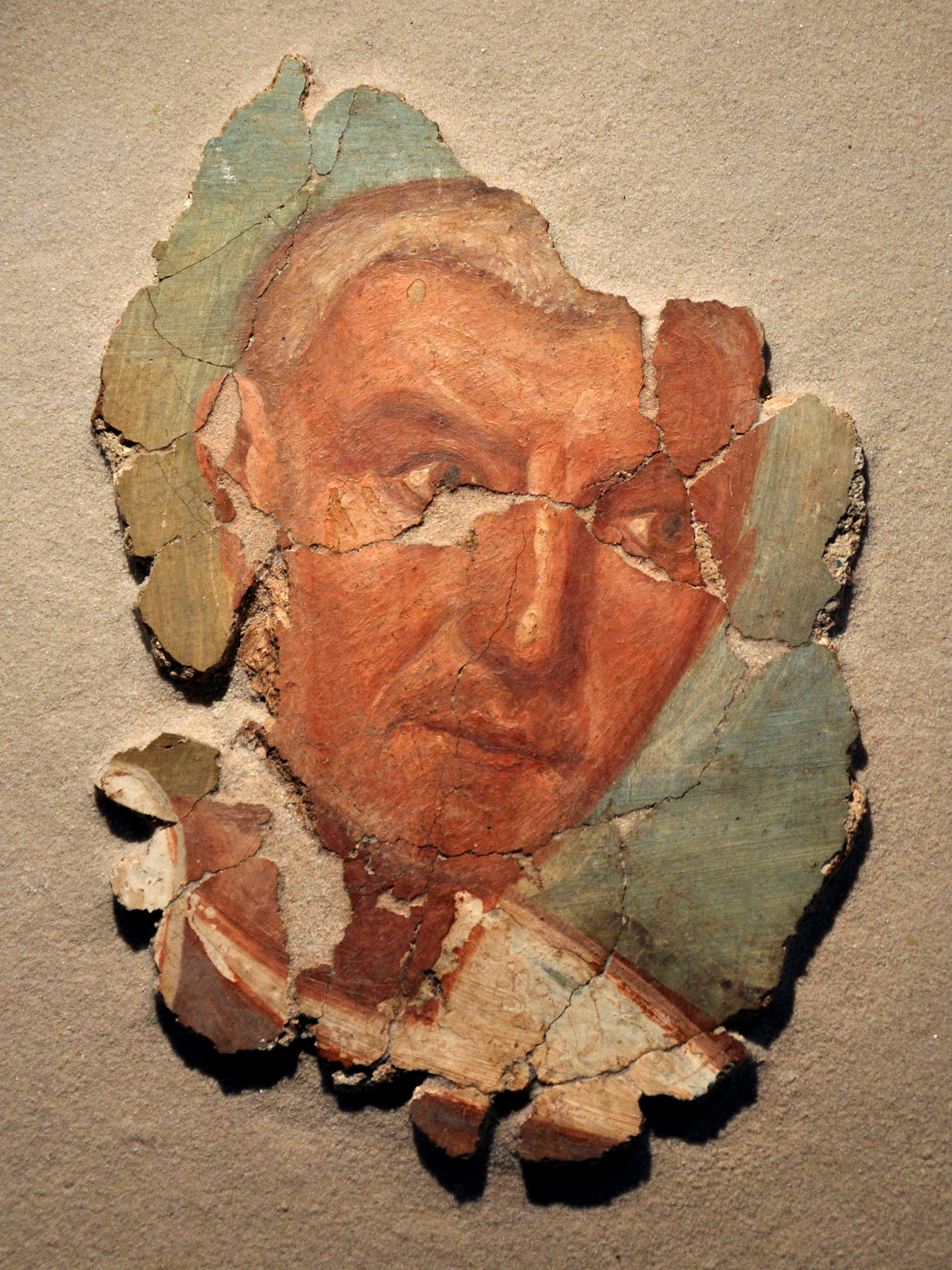
Wall fragment with fresco of a Gallo Roman man, from Évreux, 250-275 AD

In late Antiquity, the town, attested in the fourth century AD, was named Mediolanum Aulercorum, "the central town of the Aulerci", the Gallic tribe then inhabiting the area. Mediolanum was a small regional centre of the Roman province of Gallia Lugdunensis. Julius Caesar wintered eight legions in this area after his third campaigning season in the battle for Gaul (56-55 BC): Legiones VII, VIII, IX, X, XI, XII, XIII and XIV.

=== Middle Ages ===
The first known members of the family of the counts of Évreux were descended from an illegitimate son of Richard I, duke of Normandy. These counts became extinct in the male line with the death of Count William in 1118 AD. The city was burned in 1119 by Henry I of England after receiving the agreement from Bishop Audoin. The county passed by right of Agnes, William's sister and wife of Simon I de Montfort (died 1087 AD) to the house of the lords of Montfort-l'Amaury. Amaury VI de Montfort-Évreux ceded the title in 1200 to King Philip II. Philip IV presented it in 1307 to his brother Louis d'Évreux, for whose benefit Philip the Tall raised the county of Évreux into the peerage of France in 1317.

Philip d'Évreux, son of Louis, became king of Navarre by his marriage to Joan II of Navarre, daughter of Louis the Headstrong, and their son Charles the Bad and their grandson Charles the Noble were also kings of Navarre. The latter ceded his counties of Évreux, Champagne and Brie to King Charles VI of France in 1404. In 1427 the county of Évreux was bestowed by King Charles VII on Sir John Stewart of Darnley (c. 1365–1429), the commander of his Scottish bodyguard, who in 1423 had received the seigniory of Aubigny, and in February 1427 or 1428 he was granted the right to quarter the royal arms of France for his victories over the English. On Stuart's death before Orléans, during an attack on an English convoy, the county reverted to the crown.

=== Modernity ===
The countship was again temporarily alienated (1569–1584) as an appanage for Duke François of Anjou, and in 1651 was finally given to Frédéric Maurice de La Tour d'Auvergne, duc de Bouillon, in exchange for the Principality of Sedan. The most famous holder of the title is Louis Henri de La Tour d'Auvergne, son of Marie Anne Mancini.

Évreux was heavily damaged during the Second World War, and most of its centre was rebuilt. The nearby Évreux-Fauville Air Base was used by the United States Air Force until 1967, and since then by the French Air Force.

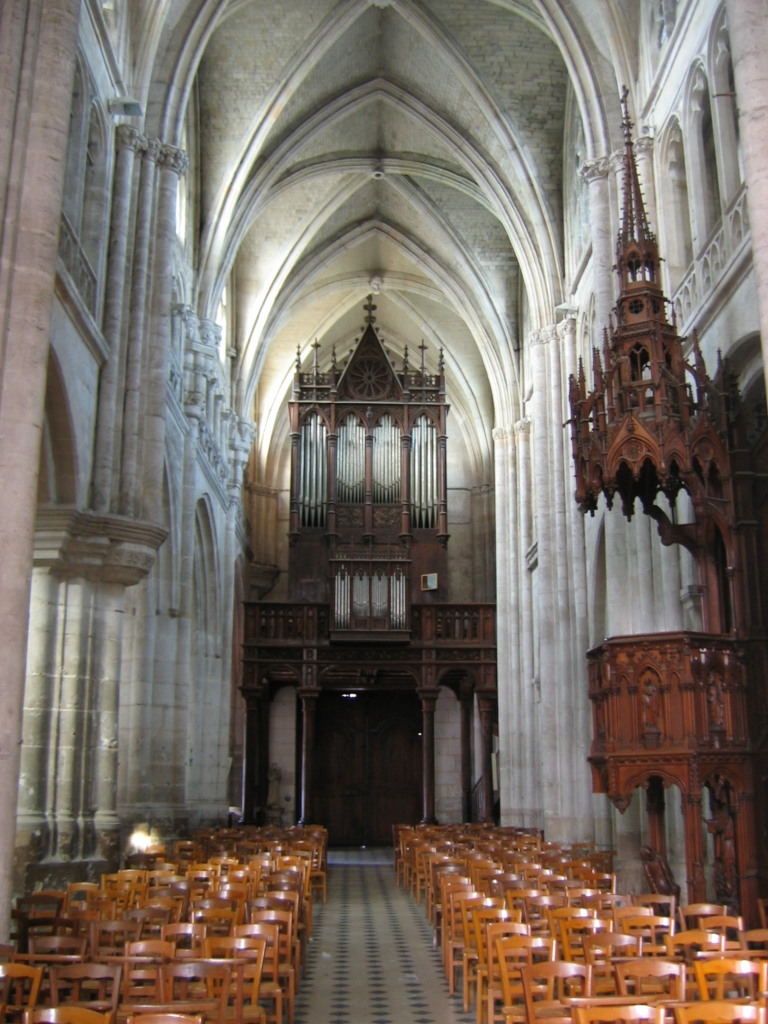
12th-century nave of the former abbey church of Saint-Taurin

== Name ==
The French name Évreux is derived from the Eburovices, a Gallic tribe who inhabited the area. Their name comes from the Gaulish eburo meaning 'yew tree'.

== Demographics ==
The inhabitants of Évreux are known as Ebroicians (French: Ébroïciens).

=== Population ===
Historical population

Year	Pop.	±% p.a.
1793	8,000	—
1800	8,426	+0.74%
1806	9,511	+2.04%
1821	9,728	+0.15%
1831	9,963	+0.24%
1836	10,287	+0.64%
1841	11,706	+2.62%
1846	11,802	+0.16%
1851	12,877	+1.76%
1856	12,227	−1.03%
1861	12,265	+0.06%
1866	12,320	+0.09%
1872	13,350	+1.35%
1876	14,627	+2.31%
1881	15,847	+1.62%
1886	16,755	+1.12%
1891	16,932	+0.21%
1896	17,766	+0.97%
1901	18,292	+0.59%

Year	Pop.	±% p.a.
1906	18,971	+0.73%
1911	18,957	−0.01%
1921	18,234	−0.39%
1926	18,841	+0.66%
1931	19,315	+0.50%
1936	20,116	+0.82%
1946	20,436	+0.16%
1954	23,647	+1.84%
1962	36,695	+5.65%
1968	42,550	+2.50%
1975	47,412	+1.56%
1982	46,045	−0.42%
1990	49,103	+0.81%
1999	51,198	+0.47%
2007	51,485	+0.07%
2012	49,634	−0.73%
2017	47,733	−0.78%
2023	49,360	+0.56%

Source: EHESS and INSEE (1968–2023)

=== Catholicism ===
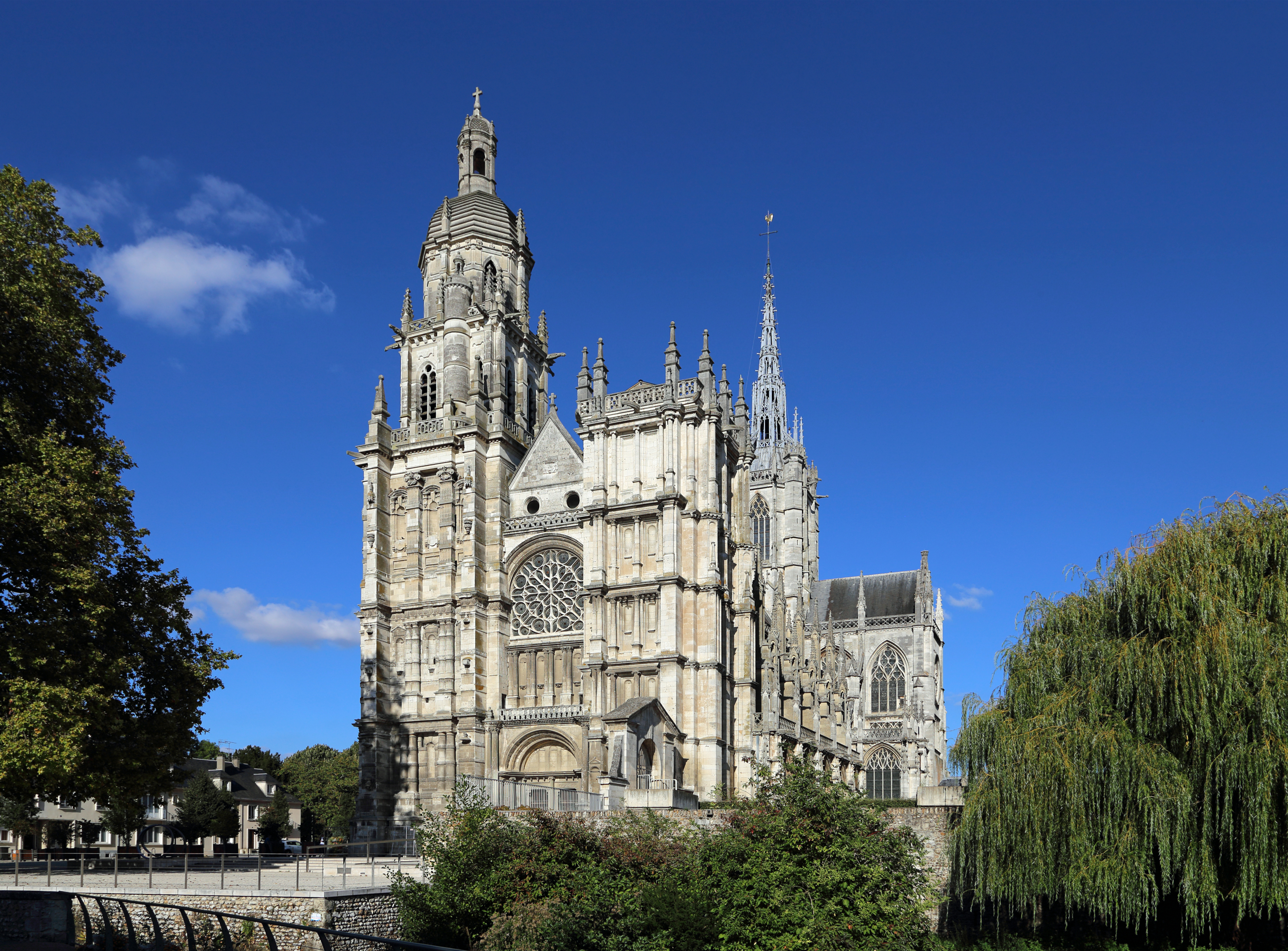
Évreux Cathedral

Évreux Cathedral has been the seat of the bishops of Évreux since its traditional founder, Saint Taurin of Évreux, most probably working between 375 and 425; Bishop Maurusius was present at the Council of Orléans in 511. The earliest parts of the present building, which is mostly Gothic, date from the eleventh century. The west façade and its two towers are mostly from the late Renaissance; the octagonal central tower dates from the late fifteenth century. Of especial note are the Lady chapel and its stained glass, the rose windows in the transepts and the carved wooden screens of the side chapels. The church of the former abbey of St-Taurin is in part Romanesque. It has a choir of the 14th century and other portions of later date, and contains the thirteenth-century shrine of Saint Taurin. The episcopal palace, a building of the fifteenth century, adjoins the south side of the cathedral. The belfry facing the hôtel de ville also dates from the fifteenth century.

=== Judaism ===
In the Middle Ages, Évreux was one of the centres of Jewish learning, and its scholars are quoted in the medieval notes to the Talmud called the Tosafot. The following rabbis are known to have lived at Évreux: Samuel ben Shneor, praised by his student Isaac of Corbeil as the "Prince of Évreux", one of the most celebrated tosafists; Moses of Évreux, brother of Samuel, author of the Tosafot of Évreux; Isaac of Évreux; Judah ben Shneor, or Judah the Elder, author of liturgical poems; Meïr ben Shneor; Samuel ben Judah; Nathan ben Jacob, father of Jacob ben Nathan, who in 1357 copied the five Megillot with the Targum for Moses ben Samuel.

== Social housing ==
The four social housing buildings in the Nétreville district will be renovated by 2027. The Champagne building will be completed and demolished in September 2025. Nétreville is also one of the 200 poorest districts in France.

== Sights ==
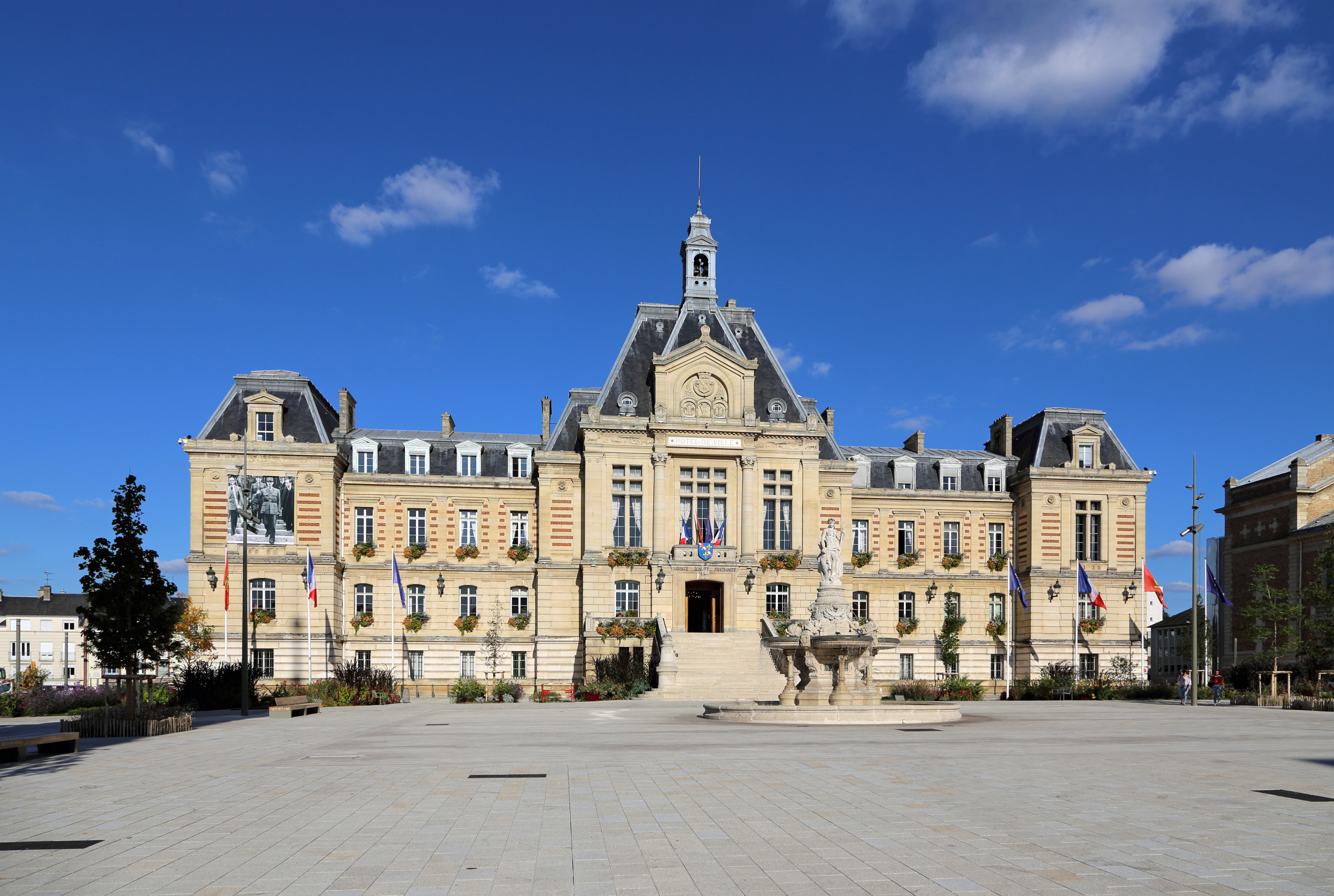
The Hôtel de Ville (town hall)

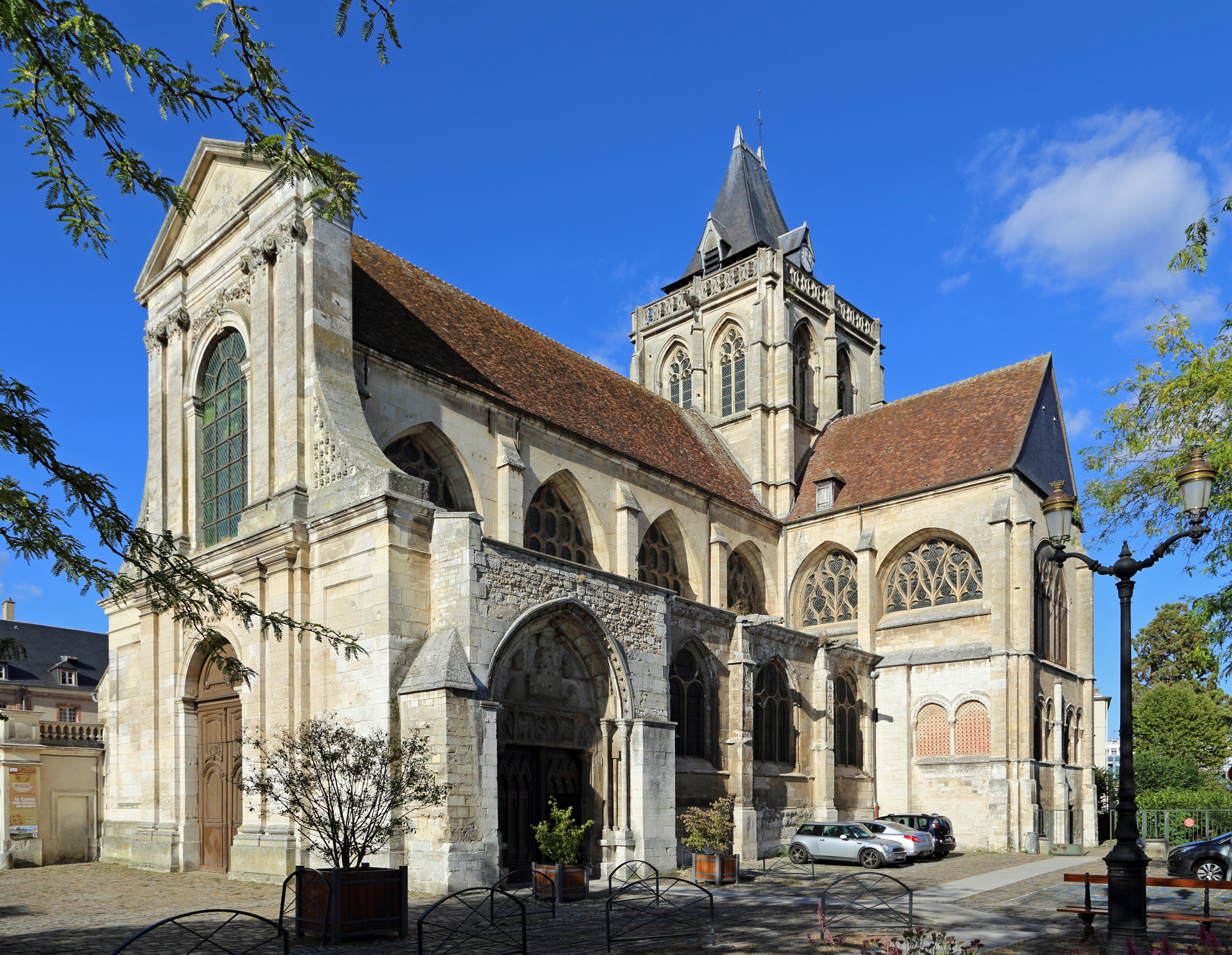
Église Saint-Taurin

Évreux is situated in the pleasant valley of the Iton, arms of which traverse the town; on the south, the ground slopes up toward the public gardens and the railway station. It is the seat of a bishop, and its cathedral is one of the largest and finest in France.

Henry I of France rebuilt the cathedral as an act of atonement to the Pope. Between 1194 and 1198, the conflict between Philippe Auguste and Richard the Lion-hearted damaged the new cathedral. The architecture of the present edifice shows this history, with its blend of Romanesque and Gothic styles. As did many towns in the regions of Nord and Normandy, Évreux and its cathedral suffered greatly from Second World War.

At Le Vieil-Évreux (lit. 'the old Évreux'), the Roman Gisacum, 5.6 kilometres (3 1/2 mi) southeast of the town, the remains of a Roman theatre, a palace, baths and an aqueduct have been discovered, as well as various relics, notably the bronze of Jupiter Stator, which are now deposited in the museum of Évreux.

The Hôtel de Ville was completed in 1895.

The Église Saint-Taurin dates back to the 10th century.

== Administration ==
- The communauté d'agglomération Évreux Portes de Normandie has 62 communes.

=== Cantons ===
Since 2015, Évreux is part of three cantons:

- The canton of Évreux-1 includes a part of Évreux and the communes of: Arnières-sur-Iton and Saint-Sébastien-de-Morsent (pop: 24,125 in 2019);
- The canton of Évreux-2 includes a part of Évreux and the communes of: Aviron, Le Boulay-Morin, La Chapelle-du-Bois-des-Faulx, Dardez, Émalleville, Gravigny, Irreville, Normanville, Reuilly, Saint-Germain-des-Angles and Saint-Vigor (pop: 28,128);
- The canton of Évreux-3 includes a part of Évreux and the communes of: Angerville-la-Campagne, Les Baux-Sainte-Croix, Boncourt, Cierrey, Fauville, Gauciel, Guichainville, Huest, Miserey, Le Plessis-Grohan, Saint-Luc, Sassey, La Trinité, Le Val-David and Le Vieil-Évreux (pop: 22,912);

=== Mayors ===
Évreux has historically maintained socialist politics, with Roland Plaisance of the French Communist Party serving as mayor for over two decades (1977–2001). Plaisance was followed by Jean-Louis Debré, in some part due to the latter's friendship with Jacques Chirac. In 2014, Guy Lefrand (UMP, centre-right) a former member of the National Assembly of France, was elected mayor, with a mandate lasting six years.

== Transport ==
The train station Gare d'Évreux-Normandie is on the railway line from Gare Saint-Lazare to Cherbourg, it is served by regular Intercity and regional rail services to both Paris and Normandy. There used to be two stations in Évreux, only one of which remains open to this day. The second station (Évreux-Nord) served the line from Évreux to Rouen.

== Geography ==
The city is on the Iton river.

== Climate ==
Climate data for Évreux-Huest (1991–2020 normals, extremes 1968–present)
Month	Jan	Feb	Mar	Apr	May	Jun	Jul	Aug	Sep	Oct	Nov	Dec	Year
Record high °C (°F)	15.5 (59.9)	19.2 (66.6)	24.2 (75.6)	27.6 (81.7)	30.0 (86.0)	36.2 (97.2)	40.9 (105.6)	38.4 (101.1)	35.4 (95.7)	29.3 (84.7)	20.0 (68.0)	16.0 (60.8)	40.9 (105.6)
Mean daily maximum °C (°F)	7.0 (44.6)	8.1 (46.6)	11.7 (53.1)	15.0 (59.0)	18.3 (64.9)	21.6 (70.9)	24.2 (75.6)	24.2 (75.6)	20.7 (69.3)	15.7 (60.3)	10.6 (51.1)	7.4 (45.3)	15.4 (59.7)
Daily mean °C (°F)	4.3 (39.7)	4.8 (40.6)	7.5 (45.5)	10.0 (50.0)	13.3 (55.9)	16.5 (61.7)	18.8 (65.8)	18.8 (65.8)	15.6 (60.1)	11.9 (53.4)	7.6 (45.7)	4.7 (40.5)	11.2 (52.2)
Mean daily minimum °C (°F)	1.6 (34.9)	1.5 (34.7)	3.4 (38.1)	5.1 (41.2)	8.4 (47.1)	11.4 (52.5)	13.3 (55.9)	13.3 (55.9)	10.6 (51.1)	8.0 (46.4)	4.5 (40.1)	2.0 (35.6)	6.9 (44.4)
Record low °C (°F)	−18.6 (−1.5)	−15.0 (5.0)	−10.7 (12.7)	−4.2 (24.4)	−1.8 (28.8)	−0.6 (30.9)	4.9 (40.8)	2.7 (36.9)	0.2 (32.4)	−4.6 (23.7)	−7.8 (18.0)	−14.0 (6.8)	−18.6 (−1.5)
Average precipitation mm (inches)	49.0 (1.93)	43.6 (1.72)	44.3 (1.74)	43.8 (1.72)	53.5 (2.11)	50.7 (2.00)	49.4 (1.94)	45.0 (1.77)	44.6 (1.76)	58.1 (2.29)	53.8 (2.12)	64.8 (2.55)	600.6 (23.65)
Average precipitation days (≥ 1.0 mm)	10.9	9.9	9.5	8.7	9.0	8.1	7.9	7.5	7.6	10.4	10.9	12.3	112.6
Mean monthly sunshine hours	63.5	79.9	128.1	173.2	193.9	207.7	213.6	205.7	170.4	120.2	72.0	61.7	1,689.8
Source: Meteociel

== Notable people ==
- Moses of Évreux was a French tosafist, and author of a siddur, who flourished at Évreux in the first half of the thirteenth century
- Esteban Ocon, Formula 1 racing driver
- Abdoullakh Abouyedovich Anzorov, terrorist
- Éric Bernard, actor
- Bintou Dieme, basketball player
- Joseph Gomis, basketball player
- Jean-Louis Hue (born 1949), writer, winner of the 1982 edition of the Prix Fénéon
- Denis Lhuillier, footballer
- Joseph Mendes, footballer
- Bernard Mendy, footballer
- Samuel Grandsir (born 1996), footballer
- Élodie Mendy, basketball player
- Léon Walras, economist
- Edmond Doutté, sociologist, orientalist and Islamologist
- Mathieu Bodmer, footballer
- Vincent Delerm, a singer of the Nouvelle scène trend
- Didier Courrèges, an equestrian of the prestigious Cadre Noir, Olympic winner with the French team in Athens
- Olivier Patience, tennis player
- Ouleymata Sarr, footballer
- Dayot Upamecano, footballer
- Gérard Serée, artist
- Jean-Yves Raimbaud, co-creator of Space Goofs with Philippe Traversat, creator of Oggy and the Cockroaches
- Ousmane Dembélé, footballer, winner of Ballon d’Or 2025

== Twin towns – sister cities ==
Évreux is twinned with:

- Djougou, Benin
- Kashira, Russia
- Rugby, England, United Kingdom
- Rüsselsheim, Germany

== See also ==
- Communes of the Eure department
- Norman language
