= Canton of Évreux-Est =

Coordinates: 49°01′28″N 1°09′04″E

The canton of Évreux-Est is a former canton situated in the Eure département, France. It had 21,769 inhabitants (2012). It was disbanded following the French canton reorganisation which came into effect in March 2015. It included a part of Évreux and the communes of: Fauville, Fontaine-sous-Jouy, Gauciel, Huest, Jouy-sur-Eure, Miserey, Saint-Vigor, Sassey, La Trinité, Le Val-David and Le Vieil-Évreux.
