= Canton of Évreux-Sud =

Coordinates: 49°1′28.3″N 1°9′4.1″E

The canton of Évreux-Sud is a former canton situated in the Eure département, France. It had 18,911 inhabitants (2012). It was disbanded following the French canton reorganisation which came into effect in March 2015. It included a part of Évreux and the communes of Angerville-la-Campagne, Les Baux-Sainte-Croix, Guichainville, Le Plessis-Grohan, Saint-Luc and Les Ventes.
