= Cantons of the Eure department =

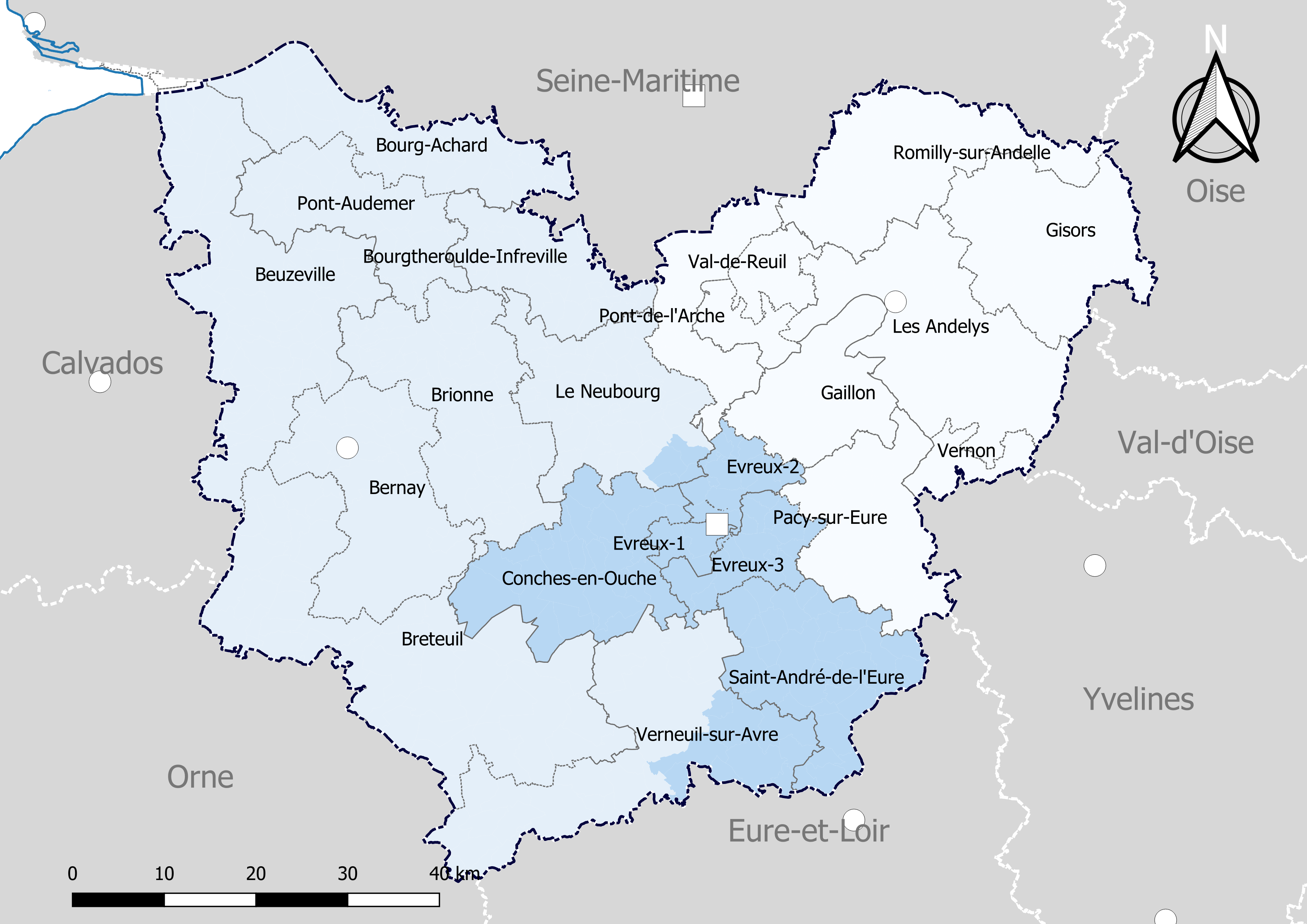
Cantonal division of the Eure department, with superimposed arrondissements (in shades of blue), as of 2019

The following is a list of the 23 cantons of the Eure department, in France, following the French canton reorganisation which came into effect in March 2015:

- Les Andelys
- Bernay
- Beuzeville
- Bourg-Achard
- Breteuil
- Brionne
- Conches-en-Ouche
- Évreux-1
- Évreux-2
- Évreux-3
- Gaillon
- Gisors
- Grand Bourgtheroulde
- Louviers
- Le Neubourg
- Pacy-sur-Eure
- Pont-Audemer
- Pont-de-l'Arche
- Romilly-sur-Andelle
- Saint-André-de-l'Eure
- Val-de-Reuil
- Verneuil d'Avre et d'Iton
- Vernon

The 43 cantons of the department before 2015 were:

- Amfreville-la-Campagne
- Les Andelys
- Beaumesnil
- Beaumont-le-Roger
- Bernay-Est
- Bernay-Ouest
- Beuzeville
- Bourgtheroulde-Infreville
- Breteuil
- Brionne
- Brogile
- Conches-en-Ouche
- Cormeilles
- Damville
- Écos
- Étrépagny
- Évreux-Est
- Évreux-Nord
- Évreux-Ouest
- Évreux-Sud
- Fleury-sur-Andelle
- Gaillon
- Gaillon-Campagne
- Gisors
- Louviers-Nord
- Louviers-Sud
- Lyons-la-Forêt
- Montfort-sur-Risle
- Le Neubourg
- Nonancourt
- Pacy-sur-Eure
- Pont-Audermer
- Pont-de-l'Arche
- Quillebeuf-sur-Seine
- Routot
- Rugles
- Saint-André-de-l'Eure
- Saint-Georges-du-Vièvre
- Thiberville
- Val-de-Reuil
- Verneuil-sur-Avre
- Vernon-Nord
- Vernon-Sud
