= Gisacum =

Coordinates: 49°00′03″N 1°13′48″E

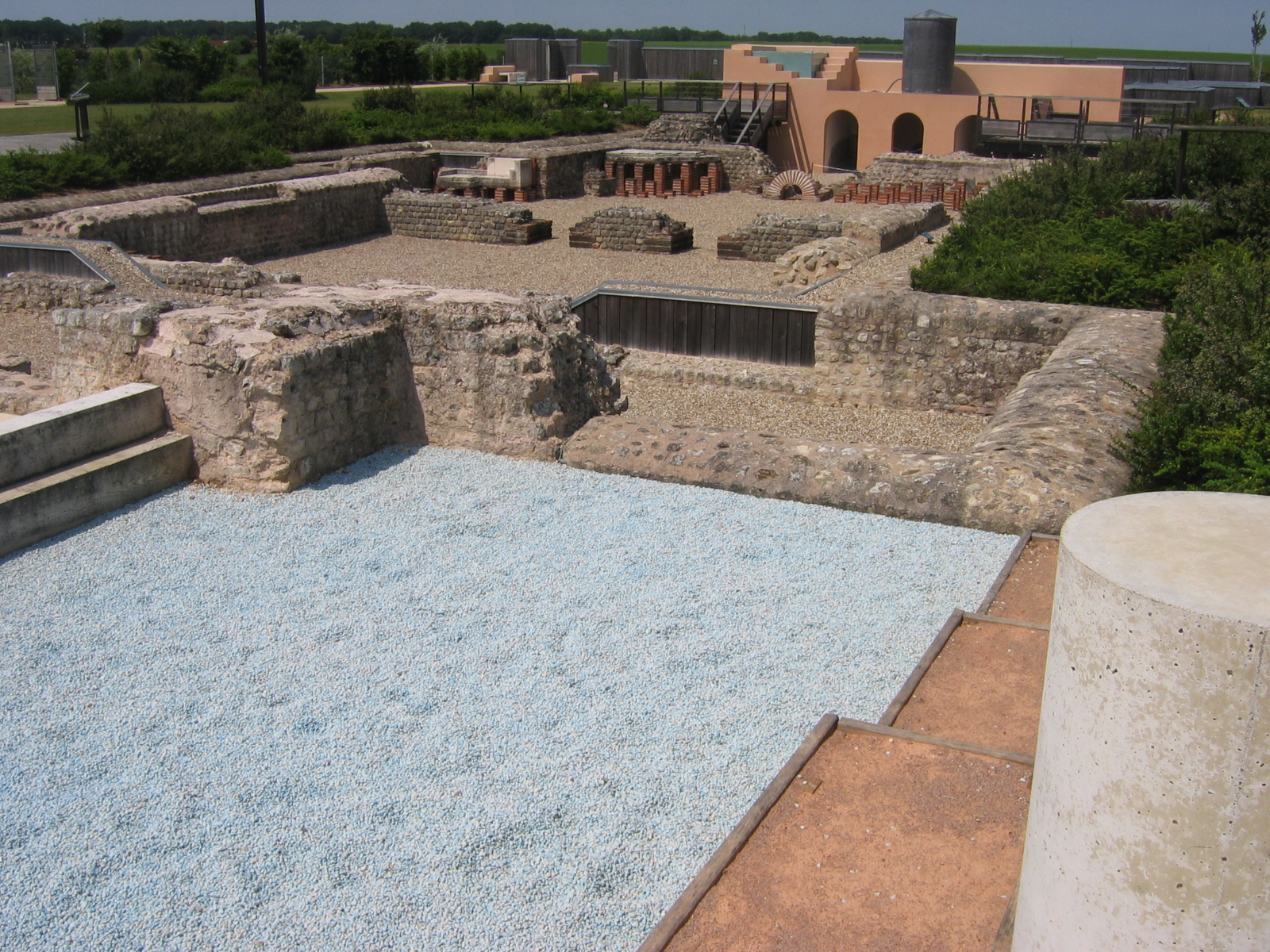
Thermae of Gisacum

Gisacum was a Gallo-Roman religious sanctuary near the settlement of Mediolanum Aulercorum (Évreux) in the territory of the Eburovices in northern Gaul (now Normandy). The site lies within the territory of the commune of Le Vieil-Évreux ("Old Évreux").

In the 1st century AD a vast sanctuary was laid out, about 6 km southeast of Mediolanum Aulercorum, on an all-but-unique plan: monumental public structures isolated at the center were surrounded by a vast empty space, with the urban habitations around a hexagonal periphery, 5.6 km in circumference, enclosing an area of some 2.5 km².

Gisacum has been excavated with increasing care since the early 19th century. The recent campaigns began in 1996.
