= Edmond Doutté =

French philologist

- Born: Edmond Théodore Félix Doutté; 14 January 1867; Évreux
- Died: 6 August 1926 (aged 59); Paris
- Occupations: Sociologist; Orientalist; Explorer
- Spouse: Jeanne Hubert

Edmond Doutté (14 January 1867 – 6 August 1926) was a French sociologist, orientalist and Islamologist - both Arabist and Berberologist - but also an explorer of Maghreb.

== Works ==
Letter by Doutté to Snouck Hurgronje (1904)

- 1900: Notes sur l'islâm magribin;Les Marabouts. Paris: Ernest Leroux. 1900.
- 1900: Les Aïssâoua à Tlemcen. Châlons-sur-Marne: Martin frères. 1900.
- 1900: L'Islâm algérien en l'an 1900. Algiers: Giralt.
- 1900: Les Aissaoua à Tlemcen, Ed. Châlons-sur-Marne.
- 1905: Merrâkech. Paris : Comité du Maroc.
- 1905: La Khot’ba burlesque de la fête des Tolba au Maroc, in: Recueil de mémoires et de textes publiés en l'honneur du XIVe Congrès des Orientalistes, Algiers: Fontana.
- 1909: Magie et religion dans l'Afrique du Nord. Algiers: Âdolphe Jourdan,(La Societe Musulmane du Maghrib)
- 1914: En tribu. Missions au Maroc. Paris: Paul Geuthner.
- 1919: Imroulcaïs, Arabic play in three acts. Cowritten with Fernand Nozière. Music by Camille Erlanger. Premiered at the Théâtre Sarah-Bernhardt, 18 February 1919, by Romuald Joubé (Imroulcaïs) and Ida Rubinstein (Oum Djondab).

== Bibliography ==
- "Notice n° L0800009 : DOUTTE, Théodore Edmond". France: Ministry of Culture. Léonore., 1 p. and 15 doc.
- Marcel Mauss (1927). "Edmond Doutté". L'Année Sociologique. Paris: Librairie Félix Alcan. Mauss., nouvelle série, vol.2, p. 6-7 Read online (rééd. dans Œuvres. Sens commun. Vol. 3. Paris: Les Éditions de Minuit. 1969. pp. 520–522. OCLC 39916146..
- Paul Pascon (1978). "Le rapport " secret " d'Edmond Doutté;Situation politique du Hoûz, 1er janvier 1907". Hérodote. No. 11. Paris: François Maspéro/La Découverte. pp. 132–159. Pascon..
- Lucette Valensi (1984). "Le Maghreb vu du Centre : Sa place dans l'école sociologique française". Connaissances du Maghreb : Sciences sociales et Colonisation. Paris: CNRS Éditions. pp. 227–244. OCLC 12908200..
- Saddek Benkada (2005). "Hassan Rachik (dossier coordonné par) : Le Maghreb dans les débats anthropologiques : Edmond Doutté, Robert Montagne, Jacques Berque, Clifford Geertz, Pierre Bourdieu, Ernest Gellner". Insaniyat. No. 27. Oran: National Centre of Research in Social and Cultural Anthropology. pp. 123–129. Benkada..
- Alain Masoudi (2008). "Edmond Doutté". Dictionnaire des orientalistes de langue française. Paris: Institut d'études de l'islam et des sociétés du monde musulman/Éditions Karthala. pp. 332–333. OCLC 276645328. Masoudi. online.
- Guy Basset (2009). "Doutté, Edmond (1867-1926)". L'Algérie et la France. Bouquins. Paris: éditions Robert Laffont. pp. 295–297. OCLC 470565360. Basset..
