= Hôtel de Ville, Évreux =

Town hall in Évreux, France

Hôtel de Ville
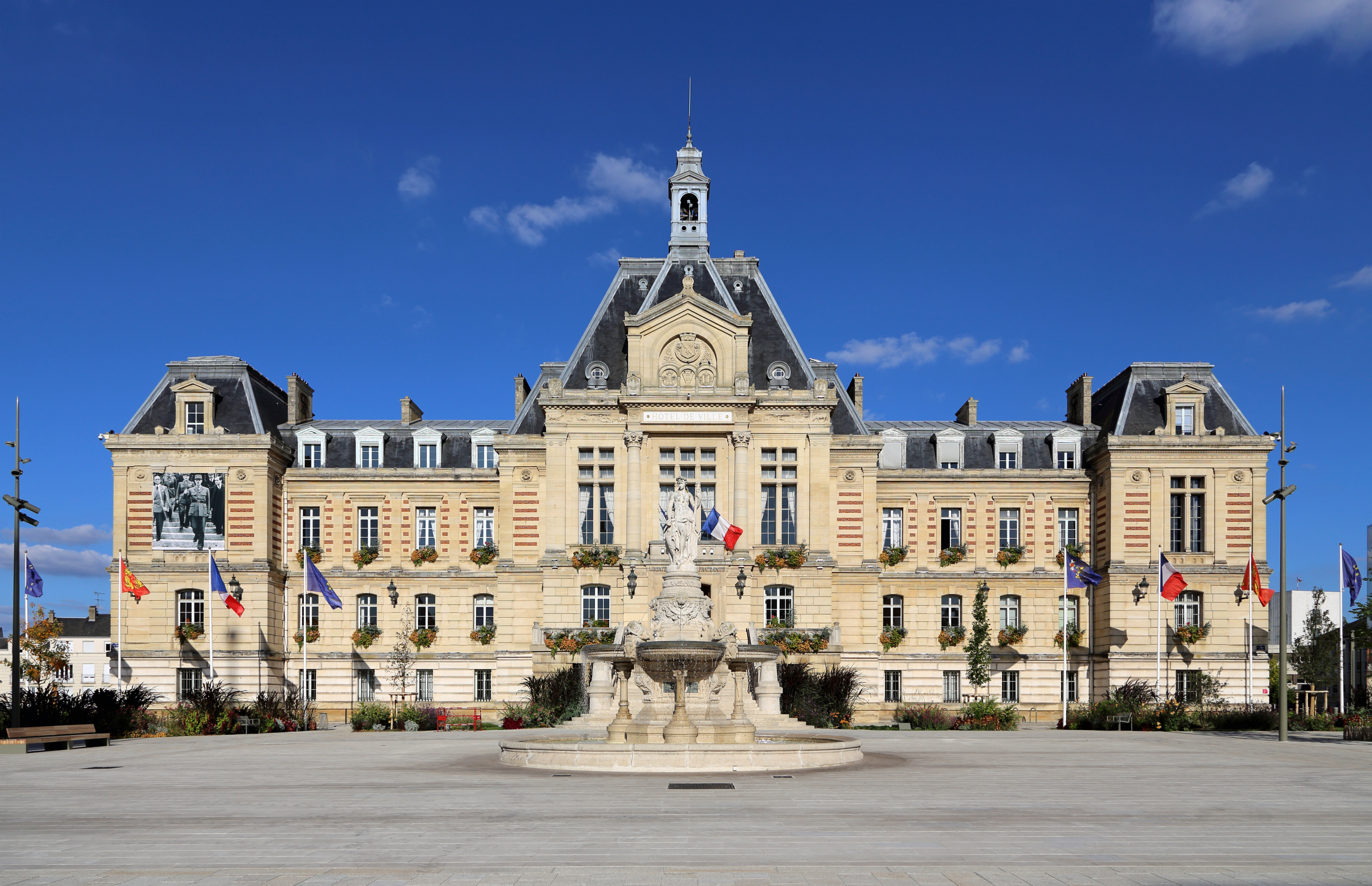
- The main frontage of the Hôtel de Ville in September 2019
- Interactive map of the Hôtel de Ville area

General information
- Type: City hall
- Architectural style: Châteauesque style
- Location: Évreux, France
- Coordinates: 49.0270°N 1.1515°E
- Completed: 1895

Design and construction
- Architect: François Thierry-Ladrange

The Hôtel de Ville (French pronunciation: [otɛl də vil], City Hall) is a municipal building in Évreux, Eure, northern France, standing on Place du Général-de-Gaulle.

== History ==
In the 14th century, the merchants and other officials held meetings in the Salle aux Draps (cloth hall) on Place du Grand-Carrefour, before moving to the Hôtel-Dieu on Place du Marché-Neuf in the 15th century. The aldermen held their own monthly meetings in the Chambre de Ville (town chamber) "above the halls of the butcher and bakery" from April 1624: the town chamber was close to the Gros Horloge (great clock tower), and a gallery was subsequently constructed to connect the two buildings.

In the 19th century, the town council moved to the Château des comtes d'Évreux (Castle of the counts of Évreux), a building which dated back to 1060. Established as the ancestral home of the Counts of Évreux, it was seized by decree of the National Constituent Assembly of France on 2 November 1789. The council acquired the building in August 1835 and started holding its meetings there from 1837.

Following the death of a deputy mayor, Olivier Delhomme, who left a large sum of money to the town in his will when he died in 1874, the town council decided to demolish the dilapidated castle and to build a purpose-built town hall on the same site. A monumental fountain, sculpted by Louis-Émile Décorchemont, was unveiled in the centre of the site in 1882.

Construction of the new building started in 1891: a large collection of Roman coins was unearthed during early excavation work. It was designed by François Thierry-Ladrange in the Châteauesque style, built in ashlar stone, and was officially opened by the president of France, Félix Faure, on 25 April 1895.

The design involved a symmetrical main frontage of 13 bays facing onto the Place de l'Hôtel de Ville (now Place du Général-de-Gaulle) with the end bays slightly projected forward as pavilions. The central section of three bays, which was also slightly projected forward, featured a flight of steps leading up to a segmental headed doorway with a moulded surround. The doorway was flanked by two segmental headed windows and the first floor was fenestrated by three tall mullioned and transomed windows. The central first-floor window featured a balcony and was flanked by a pair of Corinthian order columns supporting a frieze, a modillioned cornice and a large pediment containing heraldic shields. Behind the pediment, there was a tall mansard roof surmounted by a belfry. The wings and end bays were fenestrated by segmental headed windows on the ground floor, and by casement windows with cornices on the first floor. The first-floor windows were flanked by Doric order pilasters and there were dormer windows at attic level. Internally, the principal room was the Salle des Délibérations (council meeting room).

Following the liberation of the town by American troops on 23 August 1944, the chairman of the Provisional Government, General Charles de Gaulle addressed local people from the balcony of the town hall on 18 October 1944. He returned for a second visit, this time as president of France, on 9 July 1960. A statue of De Gaulle by the sculptor, Romain Legret, was unveiled in front of the building on 18 June 2019.
