= Denis Lhuillier =

French footballer (born 1973)

Personal information
- Full name: Denis Lhuillier
- Date of birth: October 9, 1973 (age 53)
- Place of birth: Évreux, France
- Height: 1.82 m (6 ft 0 in)
- Position: Defender

Senior career*
Years	Team	Apps	(Gls)
1991–1992	Rouen		
1992–1996	Chamois Niortais	18	(0)
1996–1997	Fécamp		
1997–1998	Lucé		
1998–2001	Chartres		
2001–2005	FC Chauray		

Managerial career
- 2005–2014: FC Chauray
- 2015–2020: OL Saint-Liguaire
- 2021–2022: ES Ardin
- 2022–: FC Autize
- * Club domestic league appearances and goals

Denis Lhuillier (born 9 October 1973) is a French football manager and former player who played as a defender. He was most recently manager of Régional 1 club OL Saint-Liguaire. Il entraîne actuellement le FC Autize.
