= Élodie Mendy =

French basketball player

Élodie Mendy (born 28 November 1994 in Évreux) is a French basketball player who plays for club Arras of the Ligue Féminine de Basketball. She is 5 ft 4 in (1.63 m) tall.
