= Cierrey =

- Commune
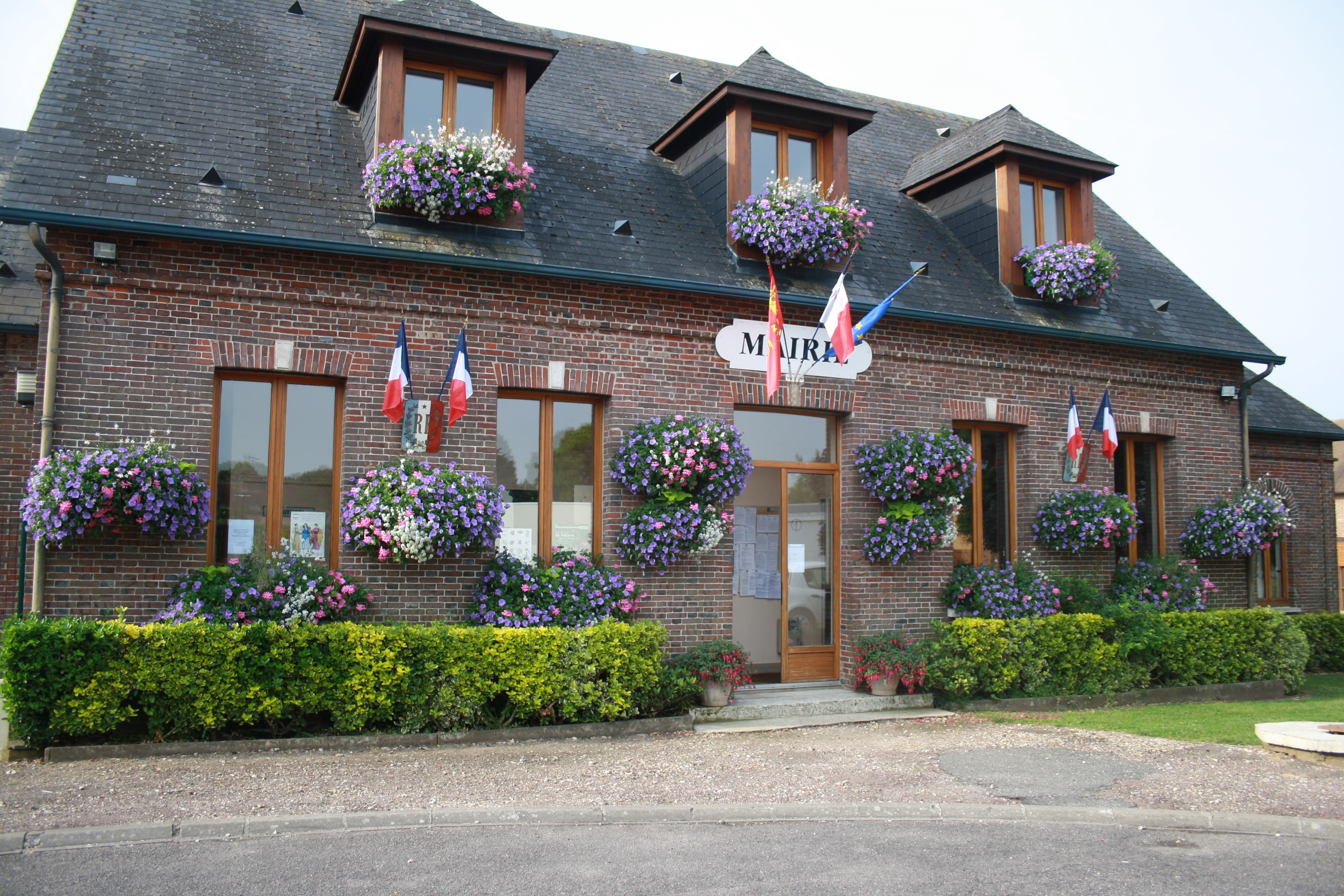
- The town hall in Cierrey

- Coat of arms
- Location of Cierrey
- Location within France Location within Normandy
- Coordinates: 49°00′24″N 1°16′32″E
- Country: France
- Region: Normandy
- Department: Eure
- Arrondissement: Évreux
- Canton: Évreux-3
- Intercommunality: CA Évreux Portes de Normandie

Government
  - Mayor (2023–2026): Bruno Suppliciau
- Area^{1}: 4.03 km^{2} (1.56 sq mi)
- Elevation: 156 m (512 ft)
- Highest elevation: 136 m (446 ft)
- Lowest elevation: 100 m (330 ft)
- Population (2023): 805
  - Density: 200/km^{2} (517/sq mi)
- Time zone: UTC+01:00 (CET)
  - Summer (DST): UTC+02:00 (CEST)
- INSEE/Postal code: 27158 /27930
- ^{1} French Land Register data, which excludes lakes, ponds, glaciers > 1 km^{2} (0.386 sq mi or 247 acres) and river estuaries.

Cierrey (French pronunciation: [sjɛʁɛ]) is a commune in the Eure department in northern France.

== Population ==
Historical population
Year	Pop.	±% p.a.
1968	182	—
1975	267	+5.63%
1982	466	+8.28%
1990	806	+7.09%
1999	796	−0.14%
2007	694	−1.70%
2012	671	−0.67%
2017	743	+2.06%
2023	805	+1.34%
Source: INSEE

== See also ==
- Communes of the Eure department
