= Saint-Sébastien-de-Morsent =

- Commune
- Location of Saint-Sébastien-de-Morsent
- Location within France Location within Normandy
- Coordinates: 49°00′34″N 1°05′25″E
- Country: France
- Region: Normandy
- Department: Eure
- Arrondissement: Évreux
- Canton: Évreux-1
- Intercommunality: CA Évreux Portes de Normandie

Government
  - Mayor (2020–2026): Florence Haguet Volckaert
- Area^{1}: 10.02 km^{2} (3.87 sq mi)
- Elevation: 114 m (374 ft)
- Highest elevation: 137 m (449 ft)
- Lowest elevation: 75 m (246 ft)
- Population (2023): 5,524
  - Density: 551.3/km^{2} (1,428/sq mi)
- Time zone: UTC+01:00 (CET)
  - Summer (DST): UTC+02:00 (CEST)
- INSEE/Postal code: 27602 /27180
- ^{1} French Land Register data, which excludes lakes, ponds, glaciers > 1 km^{2} (0.386 sq mi or 247 acres) and river estuaries.

Saint-Sébastien-de-Morsent (French pronunciation: [sɛ̃ sebastjɛ̃ də mɔʁsɑ̃]) is a commune in the Eure department in the Normandy region in northern France.

== Population ==
Historical population

Year	Pop.	±% p.a.
1926	230	—
1962	841	+3.67%
1968	1,252	+6.86%
1975	3,250	+14.60%
1982	4,626	+5.17%
1990	4,181	−1.26%

Year	Pop.	±% p.a.
1999	3,812	−1.02%
2007	4,438	+1.92%
2012	5,070	+2.70%
2017	5,697	+2.36%
2023	5,524	−0.51%

Source: EHESS and INSEE (1968-2023)

== See also ==
- Communes of the Eure department
