= Boncourt, Eure =

Boncourt
- Commune
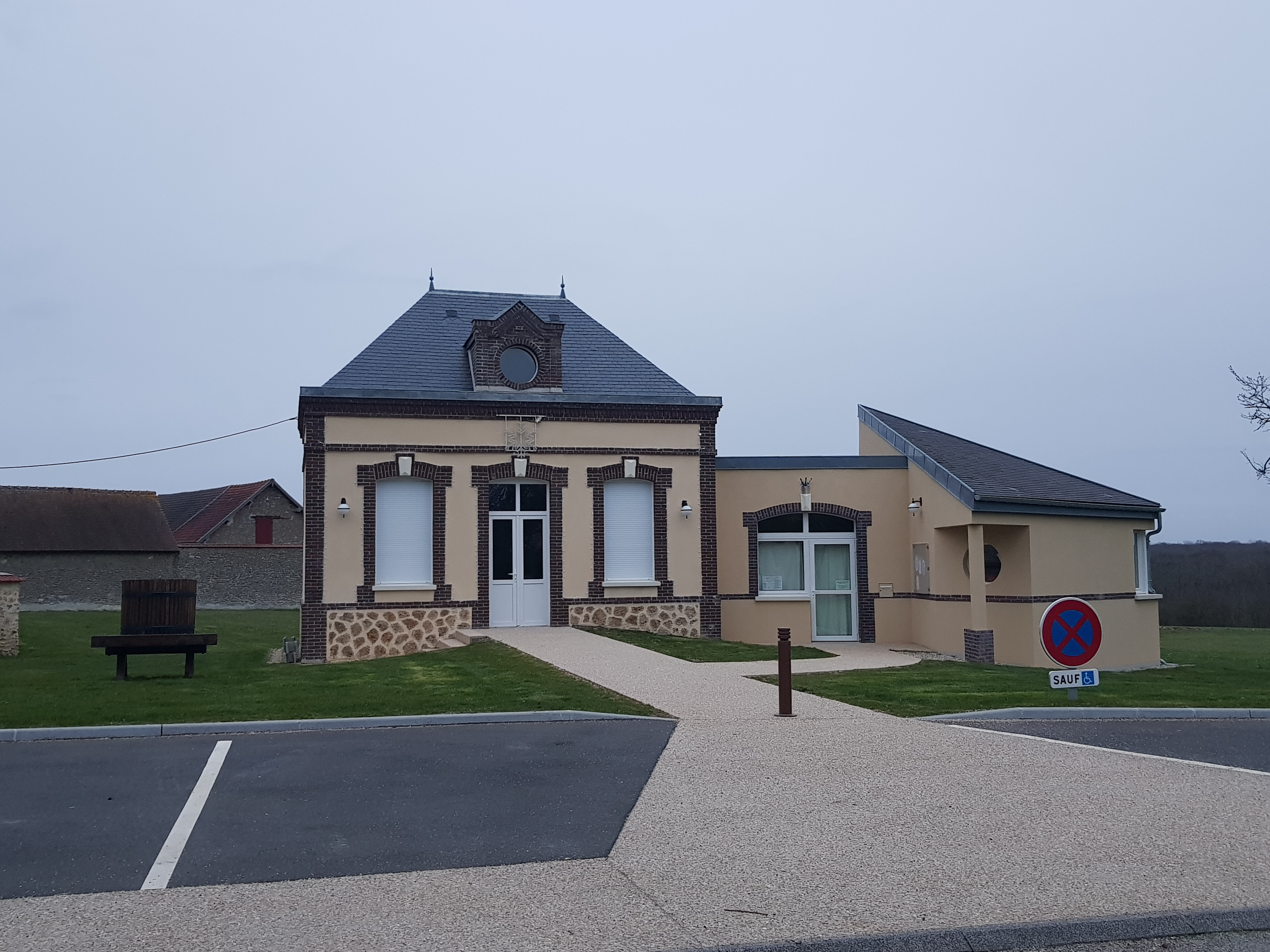
- Town hall
- Location of Boncourt
- Location within France Location within Normandy
- Coordinates: 49°01′33″N 1°18′28″E
- Country: France
- Region: Normandy
- Department: Eure
- Arrondissement: Évreux
- Canton: Évreux-3
- Intercommunality: CA Évreux Portes de Normandie

Government
  - Mayor (2023–2026): Valérie Morvan
- Area^{1}: 4.15 km^{2} (1.60 sq mi)
- Elevation: 118 m (387 ft)
- Highest elevation: 132 m (433 ft)
- Lowest elevation: 65 m (213 ft)
- Population (2023): 190
  - Density: 46/km^{2} (120/sq mi)
- Time zone: UTC+01:00 (CET)
  - Summer (DST): UTC+02:00 (CEST)
- INSEE/Postal code: 27081 /27120
- ^{1} French Land Register data, which excludes lakes, ponds, glaciers > 1 km^{2} (0.386 sq mi or 247 acres) and river estuaries.

Boncourt (French pronunciation: [bɔ̃kuʁ]) is a commune in the Eure department in Normandy in northern France.

== Population ==
Historical population
Year	Pop.	±% p.a.
1968	68	—
1975	61	−1.54%
1982	92	+6.05%
1990	122	+3.59%
1999	124	+0.18%
2007	166	+3.71%
2012	176	+1.18%
2017	186	+1.11%
2023	190	+0.36%
Source: INSEE

== See also ==
- Communes of the Eure department
