= Canton of Évreux-1 =

Coordinates: 49.02°N 1.15°E

The canton of Évreux-1 is an administrative division of the Eure department, northern France. It was created at the French canton reorganisation which came into effect in March 2015. Its seat is in Évreux.

It consists of the following communes:

1. Arnières-sur-Iton
2. Évreux (partly)
3. Saint-Sébastien-de-Morsent
