= Le Vieil-Évreux =

- Commune
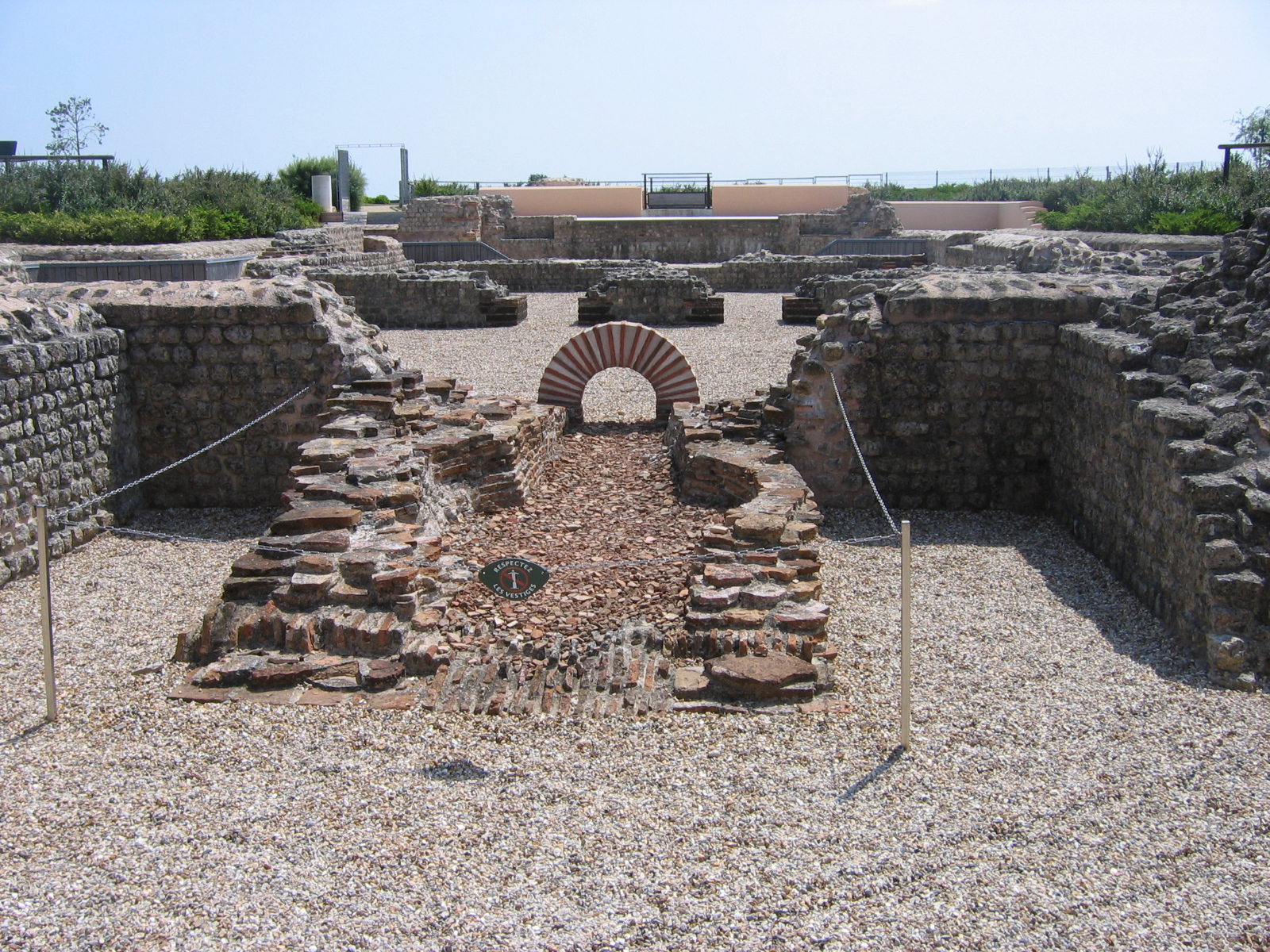
- Roman ruins of Gisacum

- Coat of arms
- Location of Le Vieil-Évreux
- Location within France Location within Normandy
- Coordinates: 49°00′26″N 1°13′13″E
- Country: France
- Region: Normandy
- Department: Eure
- Arrondissement: Évreux
- Canton: Évreux-3
- Intercommunality: CA Évreux Portes de Normandie

Government
  - Mayor (2020–2026): Marc Perrin
- Area^{1}: 11.57 km^{2} (4.47 sq mi)
- Elevation: 128 m (420 ft)
- Highest elevation: 139 m (456 ft)
- Lowest elevation: 107 m (351 ft)
- Population (2023): 840
  - Density: 73/km^{2} (190/sq mi)
- Time zone: UTC+01:00 (CET)
  - Summer (DST): UTC+02:00 (CEST)
- INSEE/Postal code: 27684 /27930
- ^{1} French Land Register data, which excludes lakes, ponds, glaciers > 1 km^{2} (0.386 sq mi or 247 acres) and river estuaries.

Le Vieil-Évreux is a commune in the Eure department of Normandy France.

It is the site of the Gallo-Roman religious sanctuary Gisacum.

== History ==
Found in the commune and neighboring Guichainville, knapped flints attributed to Neanderthals 500,000 to 400,000 years ago, providing some the of oldest proof of human occupation in the region.

On 23 September 1870, during the siege of Paris, the balloon Neptune flew from Place Saint-Pierre in Paris to Cracouville. Paris at the time was besieged by the Prussians who had cut all the telegraph lines. It finished its journey in the grounds of the Fanum de Cracouville nearby, after having covered 104 kilometres (65 mi).

== Population ==
Historical population
Year	Pop.	±% p.a.
1968	488	—
1975	414	−2.32%
1982	424	+0.34%
1990	668	+5.85%
1999	757	+1.40%
2007	736	−0.35%
2012	718	−0.49%
2017	812	+2.49%
2023	840	+0.57%
Source: INSEE

== See also ==
- Communes of the Eure department
