= Canton of Évreux-3 =

Coordinates: 49.018°N 1.165°E

The canton of Évreux-3 is an administrative division of the Eure department, northern France. It was created at the French canton reorganisation which came into effect in March 2015. Its seat is in Évreux.

It consists of the following communes:

1. Angerville-la-Campagne
2. Les Baux-Sainte-Croix
3. Boncourt
4. Cierrey
5. Évreux (partly)
6. Fauville
7. Gauciel
8. Guichainville
9. Huest
10. Miserey
11. Le Plessis-Grohan
12. Saint-Luc
13. Sassey
14. La Trinité
15. Le Val-David
16. Le Vieil-Évreux
