= Fauville =

- Commune
- Location of Fauville
- Location within France Location within Normandy
- Coordinates: 49°02′N 1°12′E
- Country: France
- Region: Normandy
- Department: Eure
- Arrondissement: Évreux
- Canton: Évreux-3
- Intercommunality: CA Évreux Portes de Normandie

Government
  - Mayor (2020–2026): Marc Morillon
- Area^{1}: 3.33 km^{2} (1.29 sq mi)
- Elevation: 132 m (433 ft)
- Highest elevation: 139 m (456 ft)
- Lowest elevation: 114 m (374 ft)
- Population (2023): 313
  - Density: 94.0/km^{2} (243/sq mi)
- Time zone: UTC+01:00 (CET)
  - Summer (DST): UTC+02:00 (CEST)
- INSEE/Postal code: 27234 /27930
- ^{1} French Land Register data, which excludes lakes, ponds, glaciers > 1 km^{2} (0.386 sq mi or 247 acres) and river estuaries.

Fauville (French pronunciation: [fovil]) is a commune in the Eure department in the Normandy region in northern France.

== Population ==
Historical population
| Year | Pop. | ±% p.a. |
|---|---|---|
| 1968 | 224 | — |
| 1975 | 234 | +0.63% |
| 1982 | 259 | +1.46% |
| 1990 | 327 | +2.96% |
| 1999 | 315 | −0.41% |
| 2007 | 293 | −0.90% |
| 2012 | 321 | +1.84% |
| 2017 | 353 | +1.92% |
| 2023 | 313 | −1.98% |
Source: INSEE

== See also ==
- Communes of the Eure department
