= Gauciel =

- Commune
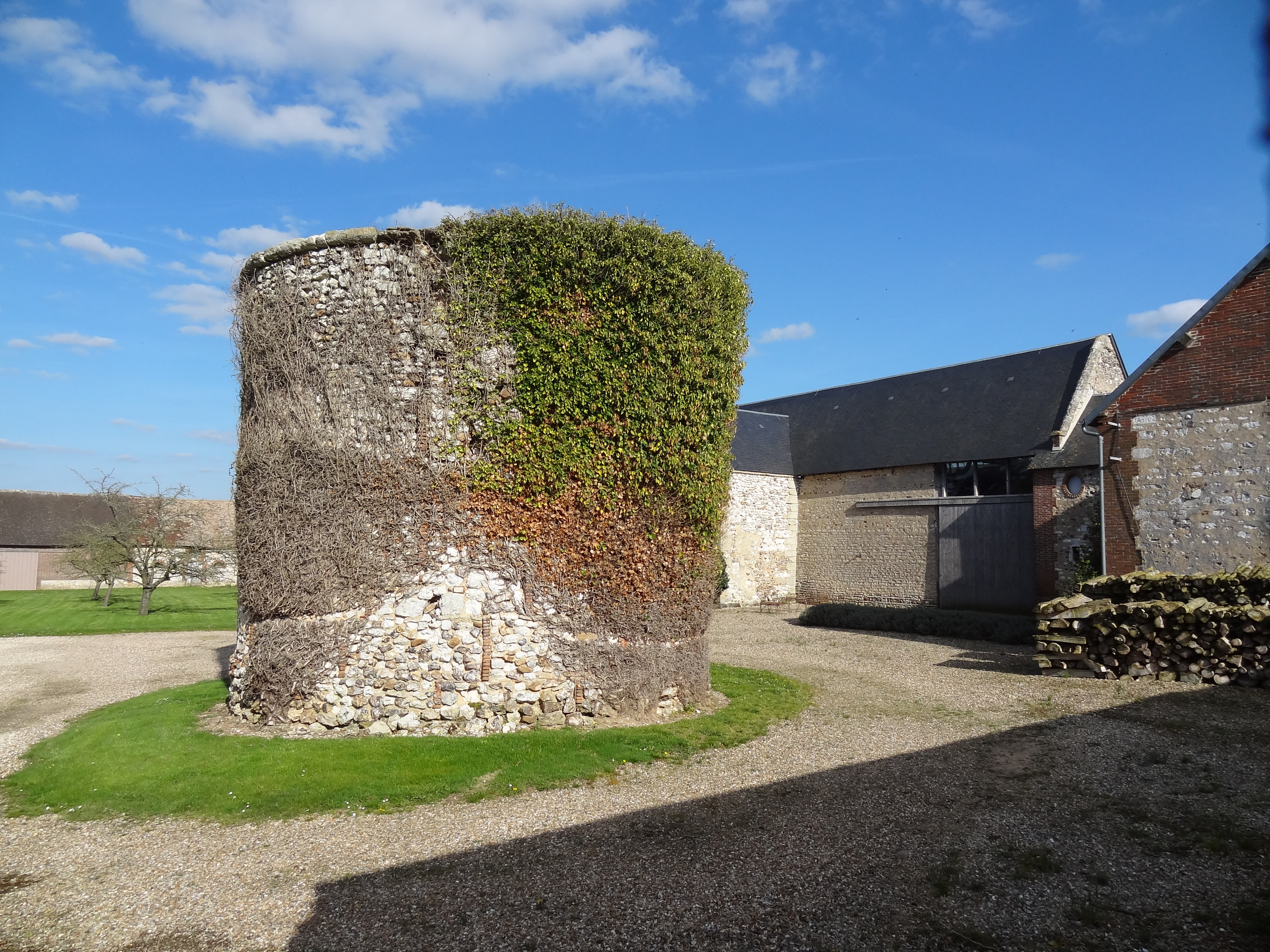
- The dovecote of the manor

- Coat of arms
- Location of Gauciel
- Location within France Location within Normandy
- Coordinates: 49°02′04″N 1°14′34″E
- Country: France
- Region: Normandy
- Department: Eure
- Arrondissement: Évreux
- Canton: Évreux-3
- Intercommunality: CA Évreux Portes de Normandie

Government
  - Mayor (2020–2026): Rénald Hamel
- Area^{1}: 7.72 km^{2} (2.98 sq mi)
- Elevation: 139 m (456 ft)
- Highest elevation: 141 m (463 ft)
- Lowest elevation: 64 m (210 ft)
- Population (2023): 1,117
  - Density: 145/km^{2} (375/sq mi)
- Time zone: UTC+01:00 (CET)
  - Summer (DST): UTC+02:00 (CEST)
- INSEE/Postal code: 27280 /27930
- ^{1} French Land Register data, which excludes lakes, ponds, glaciers > 1 km^{2} (0.386 sq mi or 247 acres) and river estuaries.

Gauciel (French pronunciation: [ɡosjɛl]) is a commune in the Eure department in northern France.

== Population ==
Historical population
Year	Pop.	±% p.a.
1968	166	—
1975	483	+16.48%
1982	352	−4.42%
1990	362	+0.35%
1999	422	+1.72%
2007	759	+7.61%
2012	879	+2.98%
2017	861	−0.41%
2023	1,117	+4.43%
Source: INSEE

== See also ==
- Communes of the Eure department
