= Le Plessis-Grohan =

- Commune
- Coat of arms
- Location of Le Plessis-Grohan
- Location within France Location within Normandy
- Coordinates: 48°57′15″N 1°07′26″E
- Country: France
- Region: Normandy
- Department: Eure
- Arrondissement: Évreux
- Canton: Évreux-3
- Intercommunality: CA Évreux Portes de Normandie

Government
  - Mayor (2020–2026): Guy Lesellier
- Area^{1}: 8.28 km^{2} (3.20 sq mi)
- Elevation: 160 m (520 ft)
- Highest elevation: 162 m (531 ft)
- Lowest elevation: 130 m (430 ft)
- Population (2023): 946
  - Density: 114/km^{2} (296/sq mi)
- Time zone: UTC+01:00 (CET)
  - Summer (DST): UTC+02:00 (CEST)
- INSEE/Postal code: 27464 /27180
- ^{1} French Land Register data, which excludes lakes, ponds, glaciers > 1 km^{2} (0.386 sq mi or 247 acres) and river estuaries.

Le Plessis-Grohan (French pronunciation: [lə plɛsi ɡʁɔɑ̃]) is a commune in the Eure department in Normandy in northern France.

== Population ==
Historical population
Year	Pop.	±% p.a.
1968	286	—
1975	459	+6.99%
1982	648	+5.05%
1990	625	−0.45%
1999	675	+0.86%
2007	738	+1.12%
2012	814	+1.98%
2017	870	+1.34%
2023	946	+1.41%
Source: INSEE

== See also ==
- Communes of the Eure department
