= Huest =

- Commune
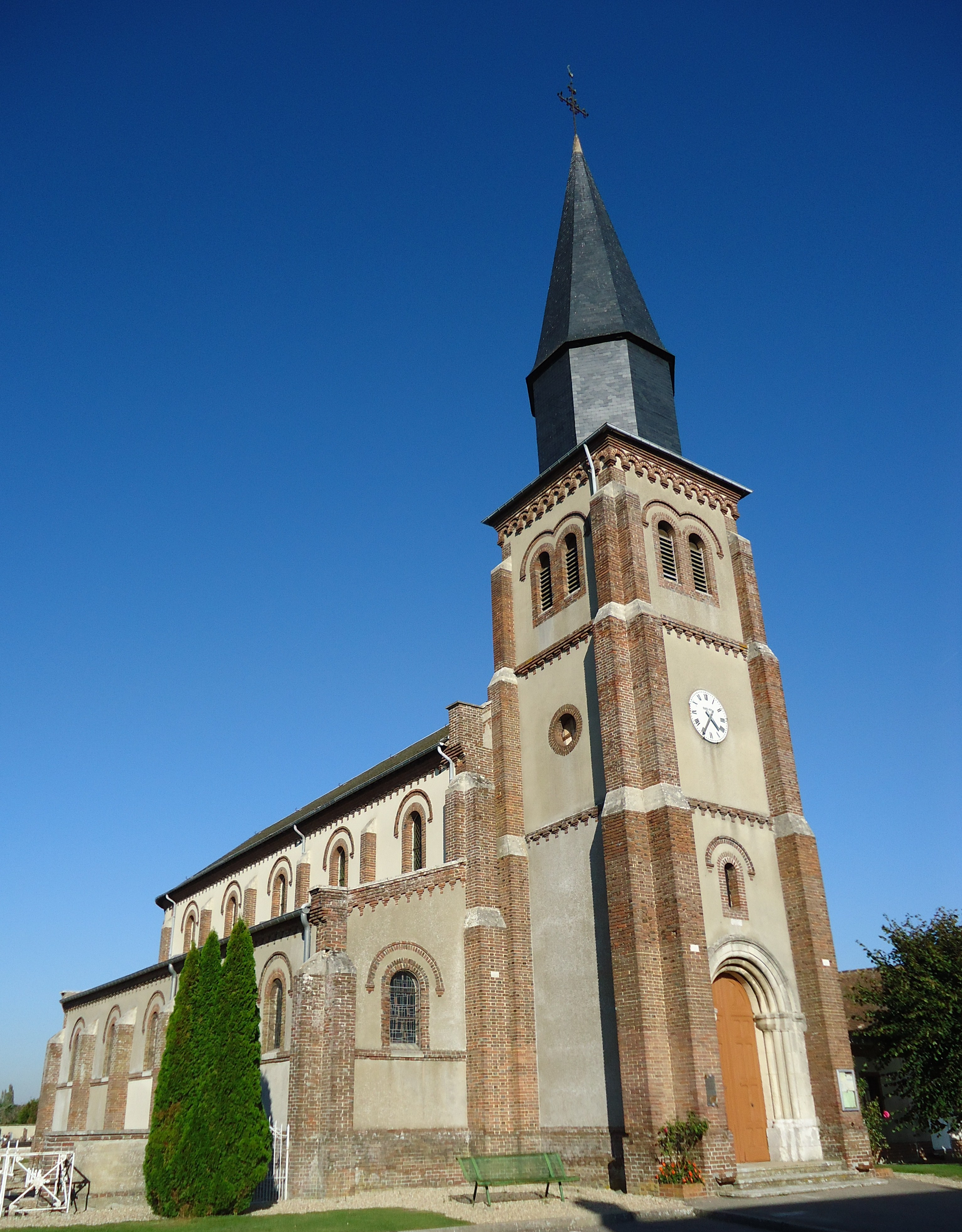
- The church in Huest

- Coat of arms
- Location of Huest
- Location within France Location within Normandy
- Coordinates: 49°02′23″N 1°12′25″E
- Country: France
- Region: Normandy
- Department: Eure
- Arrondissement: Évreux
- Canton: Évreux-3
- Intercommunality: CA Évreux Portes de Normandie

Government
  - Mayor (2020–2026): Jacky Jarry
- Area^{1}: 6.57 km^{2} (2.54 sq mi)
- Elevation: 132 m (433 ft)
- Highest elevation: 142 m (466 ft)
- Lowest elevation: 85 m (279 ft)
- Population (2023): 775
  - Density: 118/km^{2} (306/sq mi)
- Time zone: UTC+01:00 (CET)
  - Summer (DST): UTC+02:00 (CEST)
- INSEE/Postal code: 27347 /27930
- ^{1} French Land Register data, which excludes lakes, ponds, glaciers > 1 km^{2} (0.386 sq mi or 247 acres) and river estuaries.

Huest (French pronunciation: [y'e]) is a commune in the Eure department in northern France.

== Population ==
Historical population
Year	Pop.	±% p.a.
1968	231	—
1975	547	+13.11%
1982	651	+2.52%
1990	581	−1.41%
1999	606	+0.47%
2007	661	+1.09%
2012	700	+1.15%
2017	799	+2.68%
2023	775	−0.51%
Source: INSEE

== See also ==
- Communes of the Eure department
