= Saint-Luc, Eure =

Saint-Luc
- Commune
- Coat of arms
- Location of Saint-Luc
- Location within France Location within Normandy
- Coordinates: 48°58′29″N 1°14′17″E
- Country: France
- Region: Normandy
- Department: Eure
- Arrondissement: Évreux
- Canton: Évreux-3
- Intercommunality: CA Évreux Portes de Normandie

Government
  - Mayor (2020–2026): Michel Chauvin
- Area^{1}: 5.08 km^{2} (1.96 sq mi)
- Elevation: 140 m (460 ft)
- Highest elevation: 144 m (472 ft)
- Lowest elevation: 125 m (410 ft)
- Population (2023): 250
  - Density: 49/km^{2} (130/sq mi)
- Time zone: UTC+01:00 (CET)
  - Summer (DST): UTC+02:00 (CEST)
- INSEE/Postal code: 27560 /27930
- ^{1} French Land Register data, which excludes lakes, ponds, glaciers > 1 km^{2} (0.386 sq mi or 247 acres) and river estuaries.

Saint-Luc (French pronunciation: [sɛ̃ lyk]) is a commune in the Eure department in Normandy in northern France.

== Population ==
Historical population
| Year | Pop. | ±% p.a. |
|---|---|---|
| 1968 | 63 | — |
| 1975 | 121 | +9.77% |
| 1982 | 195 | +7.06% |
| 1990 | 254 | +3.36% |
| 1999 | 231 | −1.05% |
| 2007 | 248 | +0.89% |
| 2012 | 254 | +0.48% |
| 2017 | 253 | −0.08% |
| 2023 | 250 | −0.20% |
Source: INSEE

== See also ==
- Communes of the Eure department
