= Angerville-la-Campagne =

- Commune
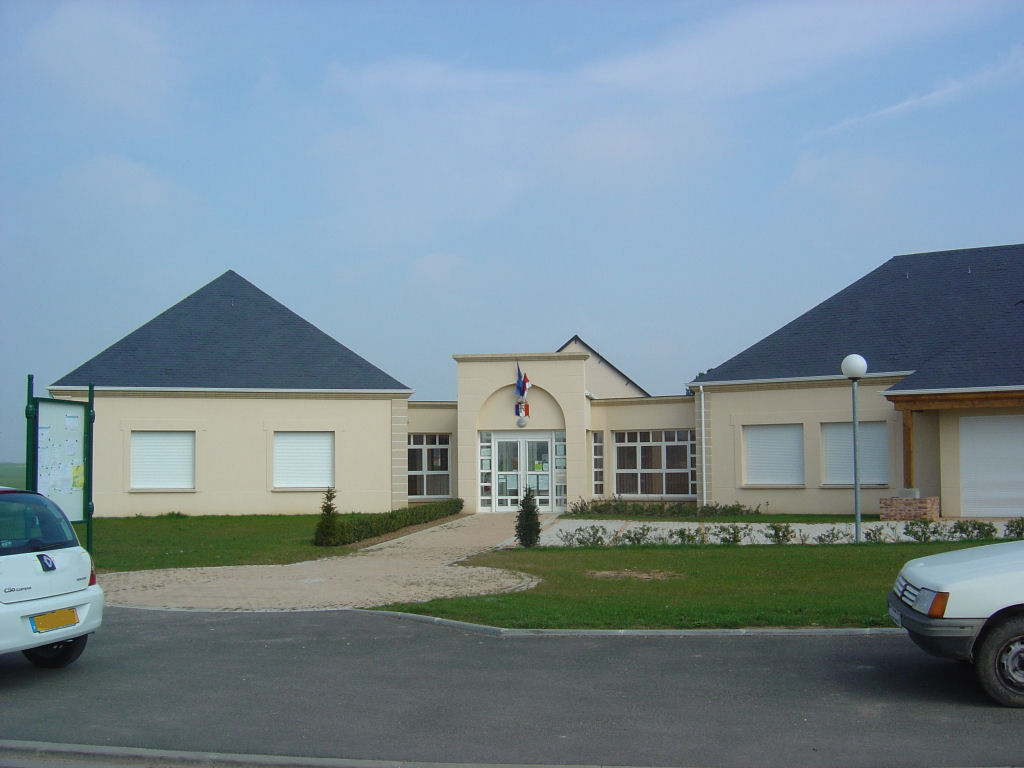
- Town hall
- Location of Angerville-la-Campagne
- Location within France Location within Normandy
- Coordinates: 48°59′16″N 1°09′48″E
- Country: France
- Region: Normandy
- Department: Eure
- Arrondissement: Évreux
- Canton: Évreux-3
- Intercommunality: Évreux Portes de Normandie

Government
  - Mayor (2020–2026): Guy Dossang
- Area^{1}: 3.62 km^{2} (1.40 sq mi)
- Elevation: 146 m (479 ft)
- Highest elevation: 147 m (482 ft)
- Lowest elevation: 125 m (410 ft)
- Population (2023): 1,433
  - Density: 396/km^{2} (1,030/sq mi)
- Time zone: UTC+01:00 (CET)
  - Summer (DST): UTC+02:00 (CEST)
- INSEE/Postal code: 27017 /27930
- ^{1} French Land Register data, which excludes lakes, ponds, glaciers > 1 km^{2} (0.386 sq mi or 247 acres) and river estuaries.

Angerville-la-Campagne (French pronunciation: [ɑ̃ʒɛʁvil la kɑ̃paɲ]) is a commune in the Eure department in Normandy in northern France.

== Population ==
Historical population
Year	Pop.	±% p.a.
1968	202	—
1975	465	+12.65%
1982	817	+8.38%
1990	1,333	+6.31%
1999	1,217	−1.01%
2007	1,141	−0.80%
2012	1,101	−0.71%
2017	1,391	+4.79%
2023	1,433	+0.50%
Source: INSEE

== See also ==
- Communes of the Eure department
