= Sassey =

- Commune
- Coat of arms
- Location of Sassey
- Location within France Location within Normandy
- Coordinates: 49°03′09″N 1°13′29″E
- Country: France
- Region: Normandy
- Department: Eure
- Arrondissement: Évreux
- Canton: Évreux-3
- Intercommunality: CA Évreux Portes de Normandie

Government
  - Mayor (2020–2026): Pascal Jupille
- Area^{1}: 4.28 km^{2} (1.65 sq mi)
- Elevation: 139 m (456 ft)
- Highest elevation: 142 m (466 ft)
- Lowest elevation: 110 m (360 ft)
- Population (2023): 199
  - Density: 46.5/km^{2} (120/sq mi)
- Time zone: UTC+01:00 (CET)
  - Summer (DST): UTC+02:00 (CEST)
- INSEE/Postal code: 27615 /27930
- ^{1} French Land Register data, which excludes lakes, ponds, glaciers > 1 km^{2} (0.386 sq mi or 247 acres) and river estuaries.

Sassey (French pronunciation: [sasɛ]) is a commune in the Eure department in Normandy in northern France.

== Population ==
Historical population
| Year | Pop. | ±% p.a. |
|---|---|---|
| 1968 | 49 | — |
| 1975 | 56 | +1.93% |
| 1982 | 139 | +13.87% |
| 1990 | 191 | +4.05% |
| 1999 | 178 | −0.78% |
| 2007 | 167 | −0.79% |
| 2012 | 177 | +1.17% |
| 2017 | 192 | +1.64% |
| 2023 | 199 | +0.60% |
Source: INSEE

== See also ==
- Communes of the Eure department
