= La Trinité, Eure =

La Trinité
- Commune
- Location of La Trinité
- Location within France Location within Normandy
- Coordinates: 48°59′19″N 1°14′09″E
- Country: France
- Region: Normandy
- Department: Eure
- Arrondissement: Évreux
- Canton: Évreux-3
- Intercommunality: CA Évreux Portes de Normandie

Government
  - Mayor (2020–2026): Jean-Luc Momper
- Area^{1}: 2.99 km^{2} (1.15 sq mi)
- Elevation: 138 m (453 ft)
- Highest elevation: 141 m (463 ft)
- Lowest elevation: 108 m (354 ft)
- Population (2023): 127
  - Density: 42.5/km^{2} (110/sq mi)
- Time zone: UTC+01:00 (CET)
  - Summer (DST): UTC+02:00 (CEST)
- INSEE/Postal code: 27659 /27930
- ^{1} French Land Register data, which excludes lakes, ponds, glaciers > 1 km^{2} (0.386 sq mi or 247 acres) and river estuaries.

La Trinité (French pronunciation: [la tʁinite]) is a commune in the Eure department in Normandy, northern France.

== Population ==
Historical population
Year	Pop.	±% p.a.
1968	32	—
1975	36	+1.70%
1982	58	+7.05%
1990	75	+3.27%
1999	96	+2.78%
2007	95	−0.13%
2012	111	+3.16%
2017	116	+0.89%
2023	127	+1.52%
Source: INSEE

== See also ==
- Communes of the Eure department
