= Saint-Vigor =

- Commune
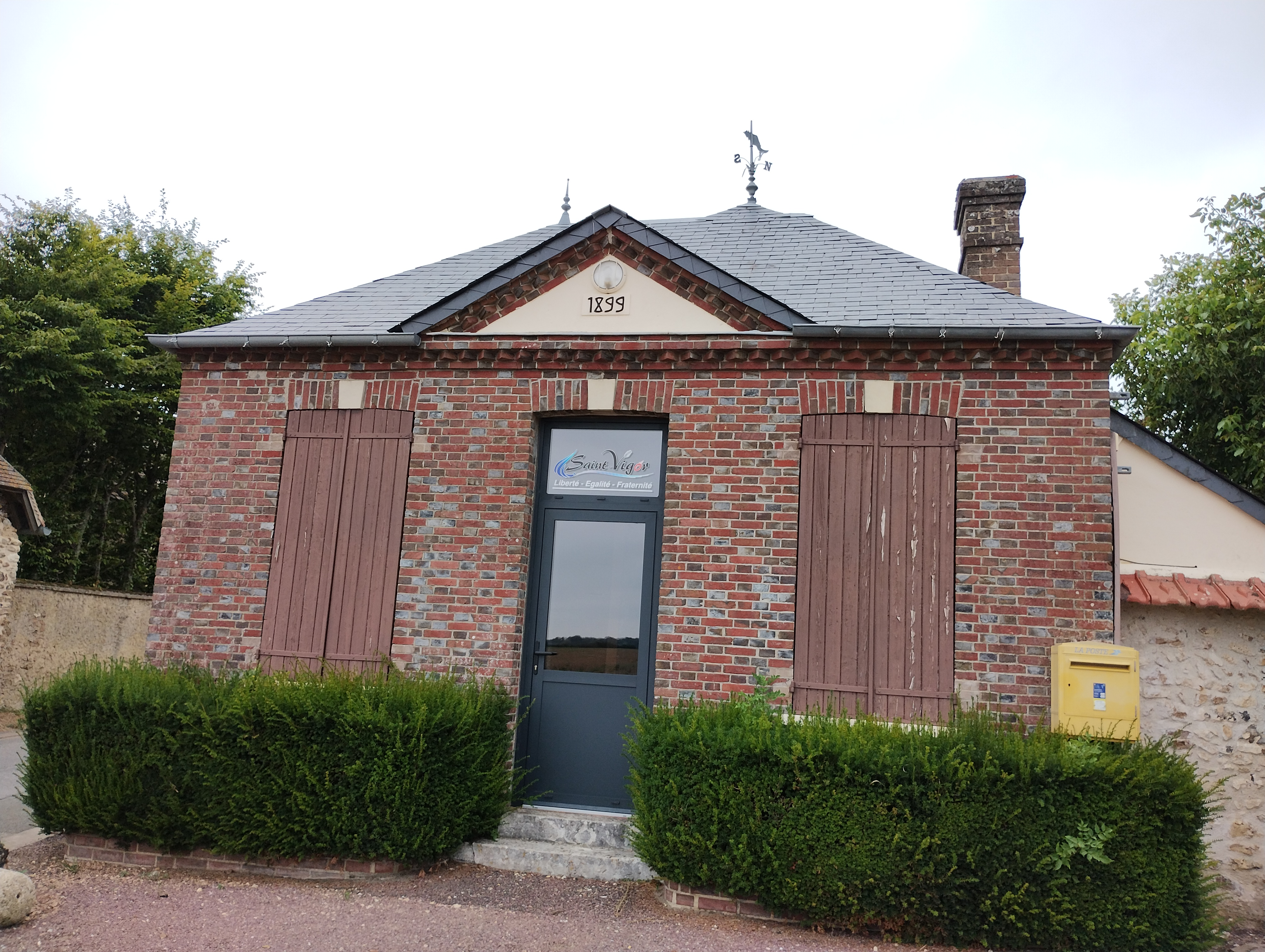
- Saint-Vigor Town hall
- Location of Saint-Vigor
- Location within France Location within Normandy
- Coordinates: 49°04′35″N 1°15′56″E
- Country: France
- Region: Normandy
- Department: Eure
- Arrondissement: Évreux
- Canton: Évreux-2
- Intercommunality: CA Évreux Portes de Normandie

Government
  - Mayor (2020–2026): Patrice Chokomert
- Area^{1}: 6.58 km^{2} (2.54 sq mi)
- Elevation: 125 m (410 ft)
- Highest elevation: 144 m (472 ft)
- Lowest elevation: 27 m (89 ft)
- Population (2023): 307
  - Density: 46.7/km^{2} (121/sq mi)
- Time zone: UTC+01:00 (CET)
  - Summer (DST): UTC+02:00 (CEST)
- INSEE/Postal code: 27611 /27930
- ^{1} French Land Register data, which excludes lakes, ponds, glaciers > 1 km^{2} (0.386 sq mi or 247 acres) and river estuaries.

Saint-Vigor (French pronunciation: [sɛ̃ viɡɔʁ]) is a commune in the Eure department in Normandy in northern France.

== Population ==
Historical population
Year	Pop.	±% p.a.
1968	70	—
1975	109	+6.53%
1982	237	+11.73%
1990	236	−0.05%
1999	271	+1.55%
2007	307	+1.57%
2012	328	+1.33%
2017	330	+0.12%
2023	307	−1.20%
Source: INSEE

== See also ==
- Communes of the Eure department
