= Le Val-David =

- Commune
- Coat of arms
- Location of Le Val-David
- Location within France Location within Normandy
- Coordinates: 48°59′N 1°15′E
- Country: France
- Region: Normandy
- Department: Eure
- Arrondissement: Évreux
- Canton: Évreux-3
- Intercommunality: CA Évreux Portes de Normandie

Government
  - Mayor (2020–2026): Stéphane Confais
- Area^{1}: 6.79 km^{2} (2.62 sq mi)
- Elevation: 130 m (430 ft)
- Highest elevation: 148 m (486 ft)
- Lowest elevation: 98 m (322 ft)
- Population (2023): 664
  - Density: 97.8/km^{2} (253/sq mi)
- Time zone: UTC+01:00 (CET)
  - Summer (DST): UTC+02:00 (CEST)
- INSEE/Postal code: 27668 /27120
- ^{1} French Land Register data, which excludes lakes, ponds, glaciers > 1 km^{2} (0.386 sq mi or 247 acres) and river estuaries.

Le Val-David (French pronunciation: [lə val david]) is a commune in the Eure department in Normandy in northern France.

== Population ==
Historical population
Year	Pop.	±% p.a.
1968	183	—
1975	344	+9.44%
1982	547	+6.85%
1990	684	+2.83%
1999	744	+0.94%
2007	757	+0.22%
2012	756	−0.03%
2017	723	−0.89%
2023	664	−1.41%
Source: INSEE

== See also ==
- Communes of the Eure department
