= Les Baux-Sainte-Croix =

- Commune
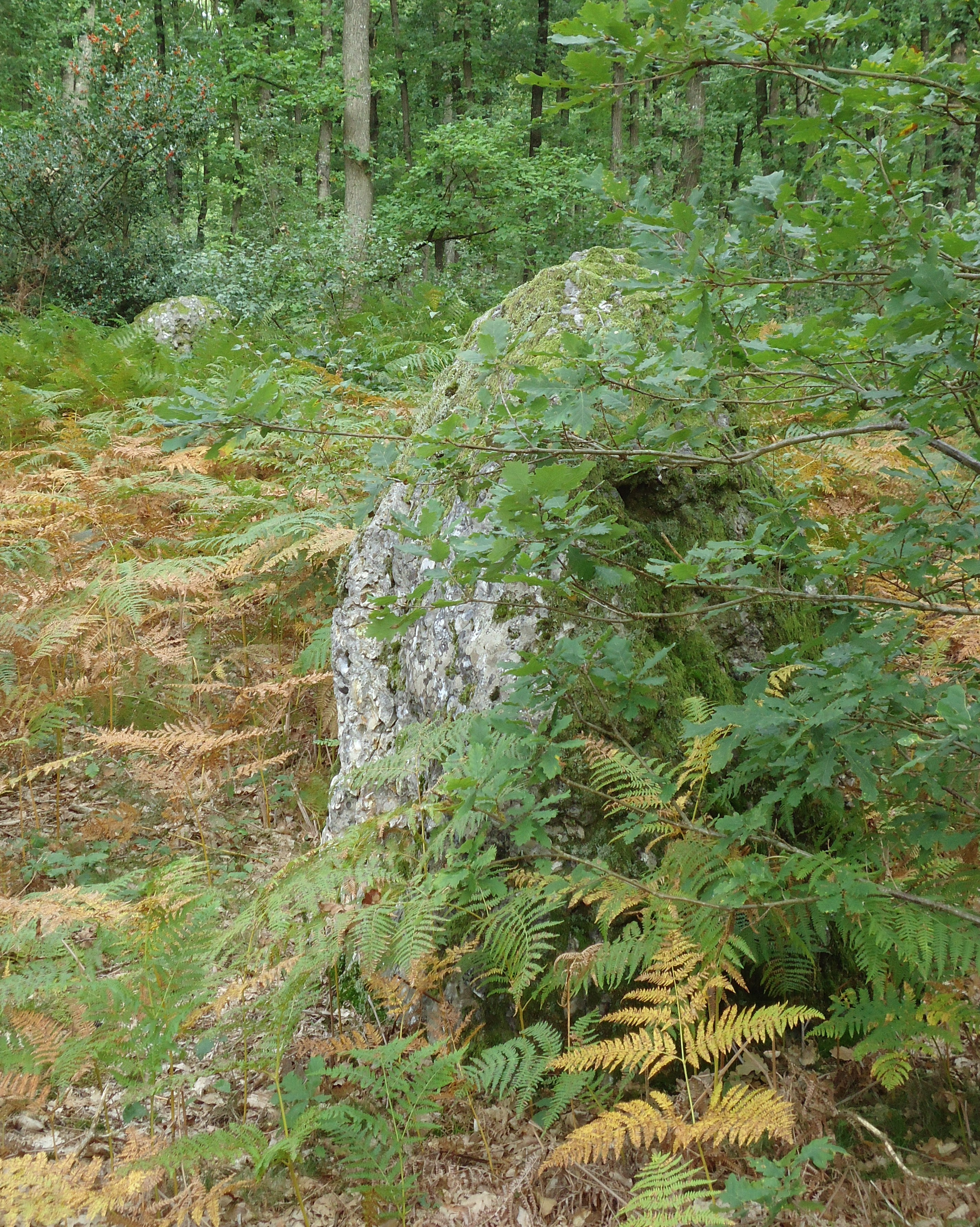
- Menhirs in Les Baux-Sainte-Croix
- Location of Les Baux-Sainte-Croix
- Location within France Location within Normandy
- Coordinates: 48°58′14″N 1°05′47″E
- Country: France
- Region: Normandy
- Department: Eure
- Arrondissement: Évreux
- Canton: Évreux-3
- Intercommunality: CA Évreux Portes de Normandie

Government
  - Mayor (2020–2026): Xavier Hubert
- Area^{1}: 17.03 km^{2} (6.58 sq mi)
- Elevation: 154 m (505 ft)
- Highest elevation: 164 m (538 ft)
- Lowest elevation: 110 m (360 ft)
- Population (2023): 871
  - Density: 51.1/km^{2} (132/sq mi)
- Time zone: UTC+01:00 (CET)
  - Summer (DST): UTC+02:00 (CEST)
- INSEE/Postal code: 27044 /27180
- ^{1} French Land Register data, which excludes lakes, ponds, glaciers > 1 km^{2} (0.386 sq mi or 247 acres) and river estuaries.

Les Baux-Sainte-Croix (French pronunciation: [le bo sɛ̃t kʁwa]) is a commune in the Eure department in Normandy in northern France.

== Population ==
Historical population
Year	Pop.	±% p.a.
1968	445	—
1975	671	+6.04%
1982	861	+3.63%
1990	1,097	+3.07%
1999	1,015	−0.86%
2007	938	−0.98%
2012	901	−0.80%
2017	840	−1.39%
2023	871	+0.61%
Source: INSEE

== See also ==
- Communes of the Eure department
