= Guichainville =

- Commune
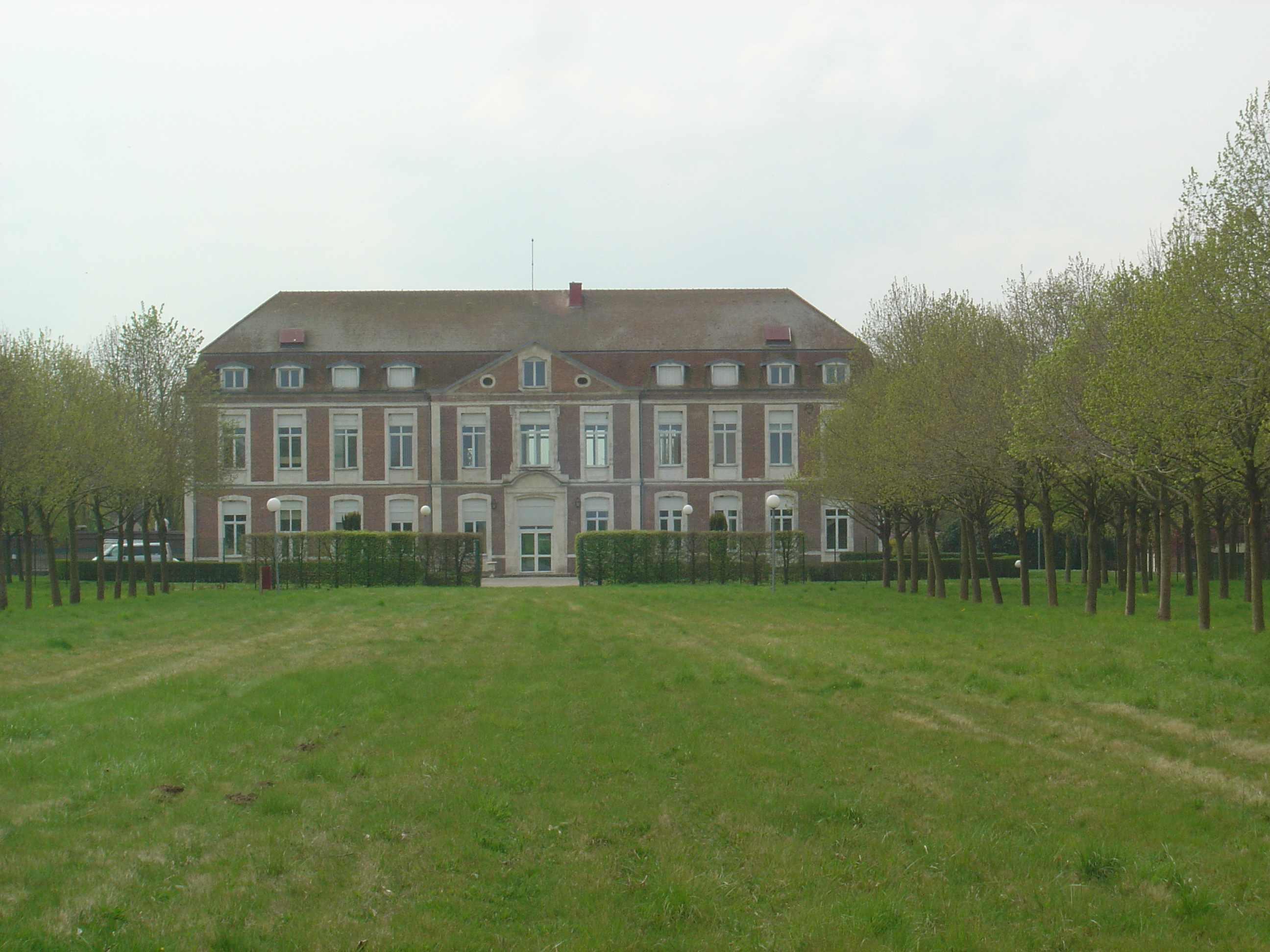
- Chateau of Bérou

- Coat of arms
- Location of Guichainville
- Location within France Location within Normandy
- Coordinates: 48°58′47″N 1°11′18″E
- Country: France
- Region: Normandy
- Department: Eure
- Arrondissement: Évreux
- Canton: Évreux-3
- Intercommunality: CA Évreux Portes de Normandie

Government
  - Mayor (2020–2026): Hélène Le Goff
- Area^{1}: 15.32 km^{2} (5.92 sq mi)
- Elevation: 148 m (486 ft)
- Highest elevation: 149 m (489 ft)
- Lowest elevation: 127 m (417 ft)
- Population (2023): 3,087
  - Density: 201.5/km^{2} (521.9/sq mi)
- Time zone: UTC+01:00 (CET)
  - Summer (DST): UTC+02:00 (CEST)
- INSEE/Postal code: 27306 /27930
- ^{1} French Land Register data, which excludes lakes, ponds, glaciers > 1 km^{2} (0.386 sq mi or 247 acres) and river estuaries.

Guichainville (French pronunciation: [ɡiʃɛ̃vil]) is a commune in the Eure department in northern France.

== Population ==
Historical population
Year	Pop.	±% p.a.
1968	693	—
1975	1,119	+7.08%
1982	1,388	+3.13%
1990	2,220	+6.05%
1999	2,486	+1.27%
2007	2,462	−0.12%
2012	2,589	+1.01%
2017	2,757	+1.27%
2023	3,087	+1.90%
Source: INSEE

== See also ==
- Communes of the Eure department
