= Martinville =

Martinville may refer to:

Places

- Martinville, Ontario or Oro-Medonte, township in south-central Ontario, Canada
- Martinville, Quebec, municipality within the Coaticook Regional County Municipality of Quebec, Canada
- St. Martinville, Louisiana, city in, and the parish seat of, St. Martin Parish, Louisiana, United States

People

- Édouard-Léon Scott de Martinville (1817–1879), French printer and bookseller who lived in Paris
- Madame de la Martinville (1555 – after 1610), French alchemist

== See also ==
- Martainneville
- Martainville (disambiguation)
- Martinsville (disambiguation)
