= Martinsville =

Martinsville is the name of several places:

- Martinsville, New South Wales, Australia

== United States ==
- Martinsville, Illinois, a city
- Martinsville, Indiana, a city
- Martinsville, Clinton County, Indiana, a former small town
- Martinsville, Mississippi, an unincorporated community
- Martinsville, Missouri, a village
- Martinsville, New Jersey, an unincorporated community
- Martinsville, Ohio, a village
- Martinsville, Texas, an unincorporated community
- Martinsville, Virginia, a city
  - Martinsville Speedway, a NASCAR race track near the namesake city in Virginia
- Martinsville, Wisconsin, an unincorporated community

== See also ==
- Martinsville High School (disambiguation)
- New Martinsville, West Virginia
- Martensville, Saskatchewan, Canada
- Martinsburg (disambiguation)
