= Heudreville =

Heudreville may refer to two communes in the Eure department in northern France:

- Heudreville-en-Lieuvin
- Heudreville-sur-Eure
