= Barville =

Barville may refer to several communes in France:

- Barville, Eure, in the Eure département
- Barville, Orne, in the Orne département
- Barville, Vosges, in the Vosges département
- Barville-en-Gâtinais, in the Loiret département
