= Le Favril =

Le Favril may refer to the following communes in France:

- Le Favril, Eure, in the Eure département
- Le Favril, Eure-et-Loir, in the Eure-et-Loir département
- Le Favril, Nord, in the Nord département
