= Noards =

- Commune
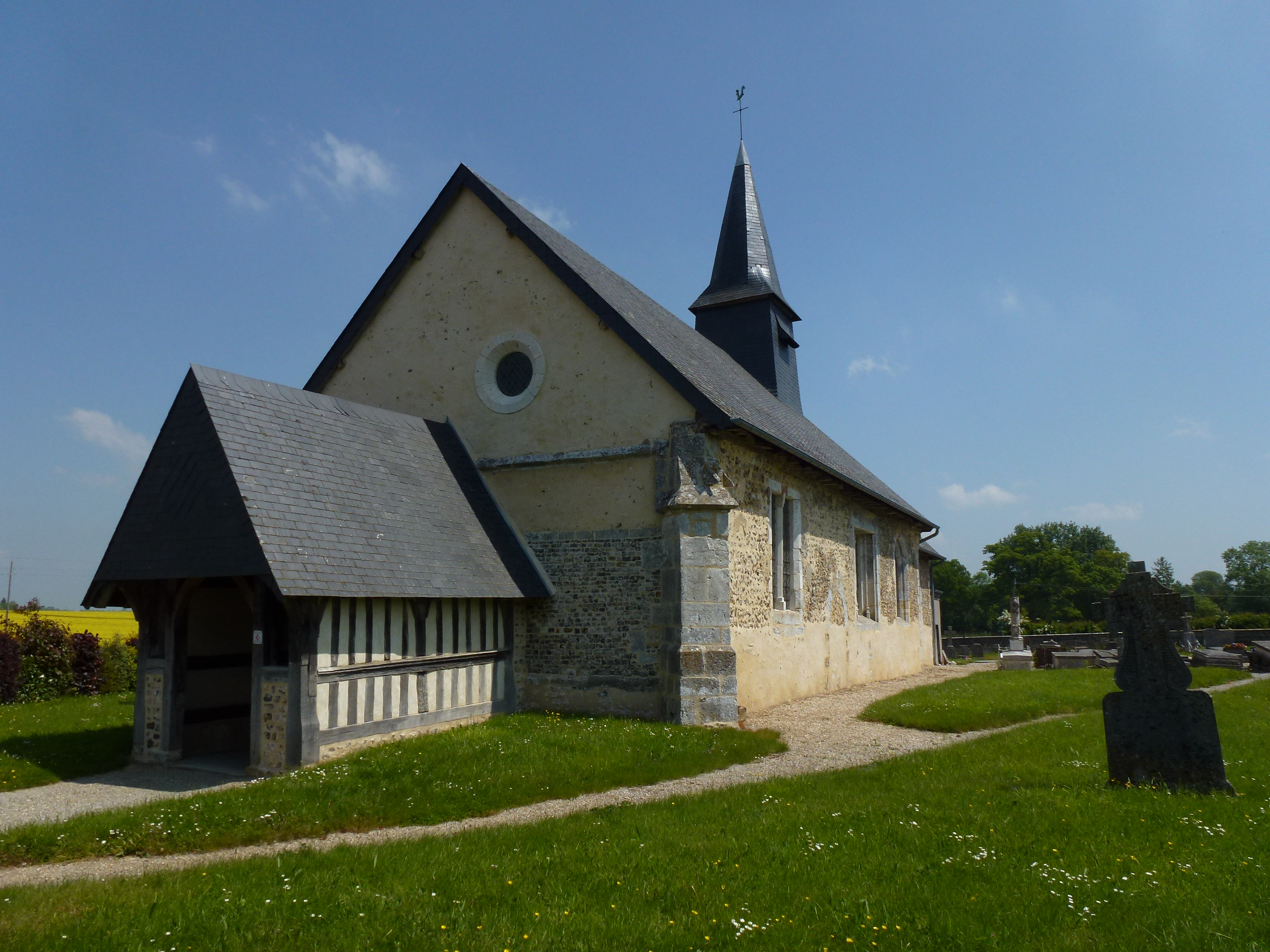
- The church in Noards
- Location of Noards
- Location within France Location within Normandy
- Coordinates: 49°12′53″N 0°30′31″E
- Country: France
- Region: Normandy
- Department: Eure
- Arrondissement: Bernay
- Canton: Beuzeville

Government
  - Mayor (2020–2026): Michel Launay
- Area^{1}: 4.21 km^{2} (1.63 sq mi)
- Elevation: 171 m (561 ft)
- Highest elevation: 173 m (568 ft)
- Lowest elevation: 153 m (502 ft)
- Population (2023): 65
  - Density: 15/km^{2} (40/sq mi)
- Time zone: UTC+01:00 (CET)
  - Summer (DST): UTC+02:00 (CEST)
- INSEE/Postal code: 27434 /27560
- ^{1} French Land Register data, which excludes lakes, ponds, glaciers > 1 km^{2} (0.386 sq mi or 247 acres) and river estuaries.

Noards (French pronunciation: [nɔaʁ]) is a commune in the Eure department in Normandy in northern France.

== Population ==
Historical population
Year	Pop.	±% p.a.
1968	71	—
1975	66	−1.04%
1982	63	−0.66%
1990	53	−2.14%
1999	65	+2.29%
2007	65	+0.00%
2012	55	−3.29%
2017	54	−0.37%
2023	65	+3.14%
Source: INSEE

== See also ==
- Communes of the Eure department
