= La Lande-Saint-Léger =

- Commune
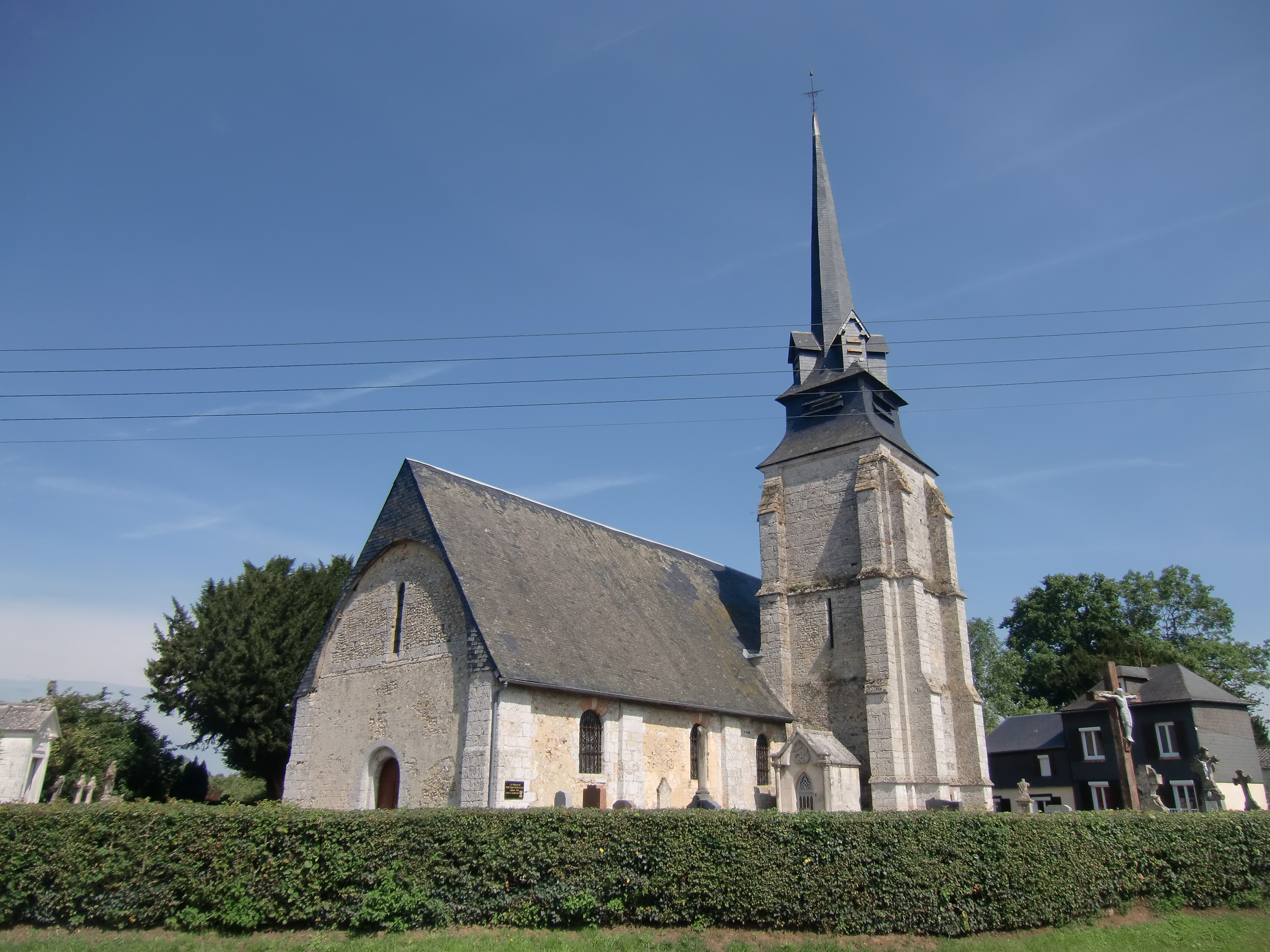
- The church of Saint-Léger

- Coat of arms
- Location of La Lande-Saint-Léger
- Location within France Location within Normandy
- Coordinates: 49°18′01″N 0°21′55″E
- Country: France
- Region: Normandy
- Department: Eure
- Arrondissement: Bernay
- Canton: Beuzeville
- Intercommunality: Lieuvin Pays d'Auge

Government
  - Mayor (2020–2026): Manuel Mordant
- Area^{1}: 7.96 km^{2} (3.07 sq mi)
- Elevation: 152 m (499 ft)
- Highest elevation: 152 m (499 ft)
- Lowest elevation: 38 m (125 ft)
- Population (2023): 405
  - Density: 50.9/km^{2} (132/sq mi)
- Time zone: UTC+01:00 (CET)
  - Summer (DST): UTC+02:00 (CEST)
- INSEE/Postal code: 27361 /27210
- ^{1} French Land Register data, which excludes lakes, ponds, glaciers > 1 km^{2} (0.386 sq mi or 247 acres) and river estuaries.

La Lande-Saint-Léger (French pronunciation: [la lɑ̃d sɛ̃ leʒe]) is a commune in the Eure department in Normandy in northern France.

== Population ==
Historical population
Year	Pop.	±% p.a.
1968	222	—
1975	198	−1.62%
1982	164	−2.66%
1990	201	+2.58%
1999	208	+0.38%
2007	283	+3.92%
2012	311	+1.90%
2017	368	+3.42%
2023	405	+1.61%
Source: INSEE

== See also ==
- Communes of the Eure department
