= Saint-Germain-la-Campagne =

- Commune
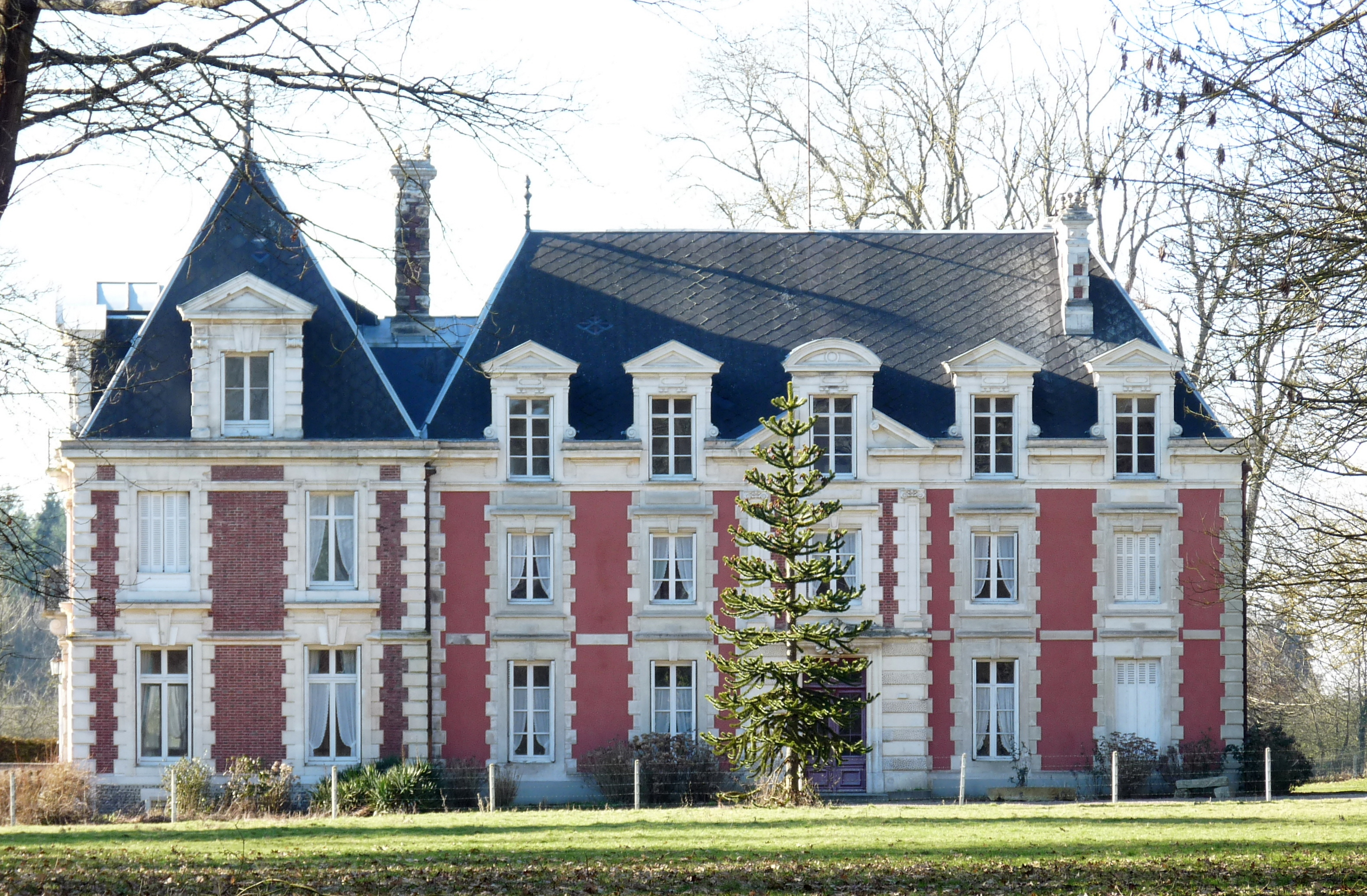
- The Grand-Feugueray manor in Saint-Germain-la-Campagne
- Location of Saint-Germain-la-Campagne
- Location within France Location within Normandy
- Coordinates: 49°02′57″N 0°24′23″E
- Country: France
- Region: Normandy
- Department: Eure
- Arrondissement: Bernay
- Canton: Beuzeville

Government
  - Mayor (2020–2026): Sébastien Duval
- Area^{1}: 22.23 km^{2} (8.58 sq mi)
- Elevation: 185 m (607 ft)
- Highest elevation: 191 m (627 ft)
- Lowest elevation: 110 m (360 ft)
- Population (2023): 845
  - Density: 38.0/km^{2} (98.4/sq mi)
- Time zone: UTC+01:00 (CET)
  - Summer (DST): UTC+02:00 (CEST)
- INSEE/Postal code: 27547 /27230
- ^{1} French Land Register data, which excludes lakes, ponds, glaciers > 1 km^{2} (0.386 sq mi or 247 acres) and river estuaries.

Saint-Germain-la-Campagne is a commune in the Eure department in Normandy in northern France.

== Population ==
Historical population
Year	Pop.	±% p.a.
1968	642	—
1975	747	+2.19%
1982	755	+0.15%
1990	793	+0.62%
1999	748	−0.65%
2007	780	+0.53%
2012	895	+2.79%
2017	893	−0.04%
2023	845	−0.92%
Source: INSEE

== See also ==
- Communes of the Eure department
