= Saint-Martin-Saint-Firmin =

- Commune
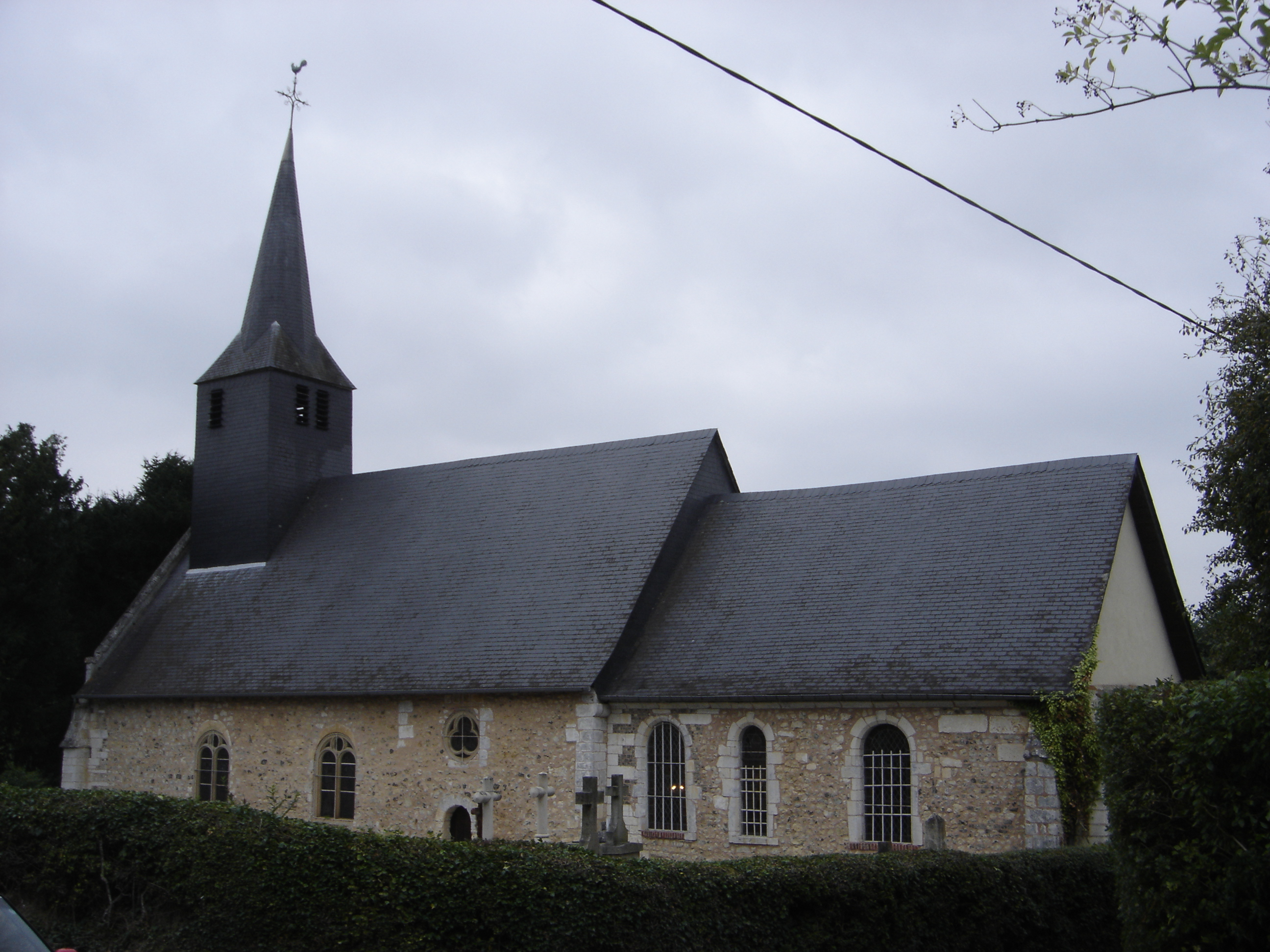
- The church in Saint-Martin-Saint-Firmin
- Location of Saint-Martin-Saint-Firmin
- Location within France Location within Normandy
- Coordinates: 49°17′11″N 0°33′10″E
- Country: France
- Region: Normandy
- Department: Eure
- Arrondissement: Bernay
- Canton: Beuzeville

Government
  - Mayor (2020–2026): Anne-Marie Roelens
- Area^{1}: 6.37 km^{2} (2.46 sq mi)
- Elevation: 136 m (446 ft)
- Population (2023): 334
  - Density: 52.4/km^{2} (136/sq mi)
- Time zone: UTC+01:00 (CET)
  - Summer (DST): UTC+02:00 (CEST)
- INSEE/Postal code: 27571 /27450
- ^{1} French Land Register data, which excludes lakes, ponds, glaciers > 1 km^{2} (0.386 sq mi or 247 acres) and river estuaries.

Saint-Martin-Saint-Firmin (French pronunciation: [sɛ̃ maʁtɛ̃ sɛ̃ fiʁmɛ̃]) is a commune in the Eure department in Normandy in northern France.

== Geography ==
The commune along with another 69 communes shares part of a 4,747 hectare, Natura 2000 conservation area, called Risle, Guiel, Charentonne.

== Population ==
Historical population
Year	Pop.	±% p.a.
1968	229	—
1975	211	−1.16%
1982	206	−0.34%
1990	194	−0.75%
1999	196	+0.11%
2007	231	+2.08%
2012	298	+5.23%
2017	329	+2.00%
2023	334	+0.25%
Source: INSEE

== See also ==
- Communes of the Eure department
