= Martinsburg =

Martinsburg may refer to:

== Places ==
In the United States:

- New Martinsburg, Ohio
- Martinsburg, Indiana
- Martinsburg, Iowa
- Sandy Hook, Kentucky, originally incorporated as Martinsburg
- Martinsburg, Missouri
- Martinsburg, Ripley County, Missouri
- Martinsburg, Nebraska
- Martinsburg, New York
- Martinsburg, Ohio
- Martinsburg, Pennsylvania
- Martinsburg Junction, Pennsylvania
- Martinsburg Township, Renville County, Minnesota
- Martinsburg Township, Pike County, Illinois
- Martinsburg, West Virginia
  - Martinsburg station, in Martinsburg, West Virginia

In Germany:

- Martinsburg, Mainz, a fortress which was demolished in 1809 (see Electoral Palace Mainz)
