= Épreville-en-Lieuvin =

- Commune
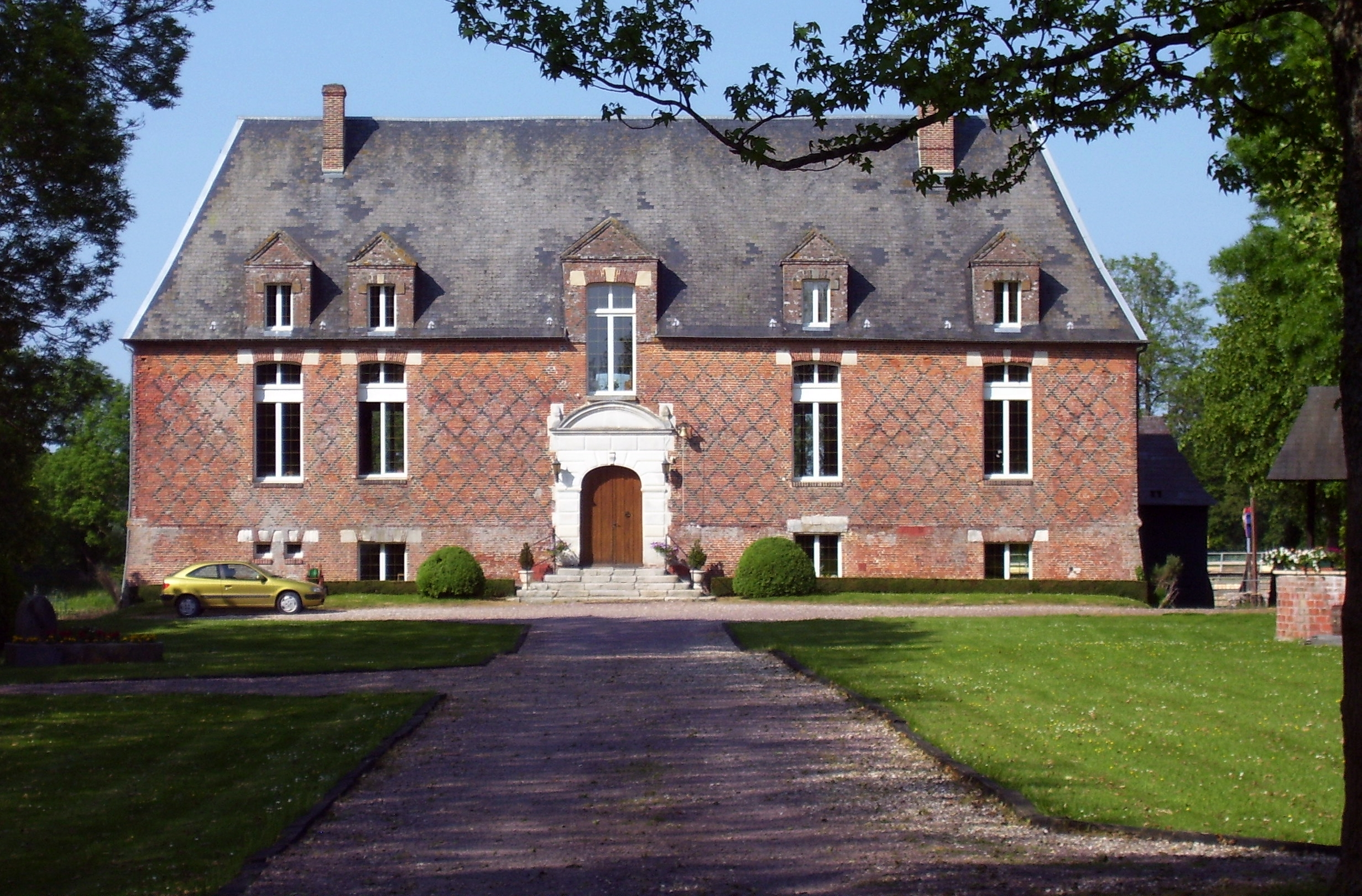
- The manor house of the fief La Fortière
- Location of Épreville-en-Lieuvin
- Location within France Location within Normandy
- Coordinates: 49°12′11″N 0°32′14″E
- Country: France
- Region: Normandy
- Department: Eure
- Arrondissement: Bernay
- Canton: Beuzeville

Government
  - Mayor (2020–2026): Jean-Nicolas Joubert
- Area^{1}: 6.72 km^{2} (2.59 sq mi)
- Elevation: 172 m (564 ft)
- Highest elevation: 173 m (568 ft)
- Lowest elevation: 150 m (490 ft)
- Population (2023): 199
  - Density: 29.6/km^{2} (76.7/sq mi)
- Time zone: UTC+01:00 (CET)
  - Summer (DST): UTC+02:00 (CEST)
- INSEE/Postal code: 27222 /27560
- ^{1} French Land Register data, which excludes lakes, ponds, glaciers > 1 km^{2} (0.386 sq mi or 247 acres) and river estuaries.

Épreville-en-Lieuvin (French pronunciation: [epʁəvil ɑ̃ ljøvɛ̃], literally Épreville in Lieuvin) is a commune in the Eure department in the Normandy region in northern France.

== Population ==
Historical population
Year	Pop.	±% p.a.
1968	201	—
1975	180	−1.56%
1982	192	+0.93%
1990	145	−3.45%
1999	169	+1.72%
2007	177	+0.58%
2012	209	+3.38%
2017	195	−1.38%
2023	199	+0.34%
Source: INSEE

== See also ==
- Communes of the Eure department
