= La Chapelle-Hareng =

- Commune
- Location of La Chapelle-Hareng
- Location within France Location within Normandy
- Coordinates: 49°06′53″N 0°24′57″E
- Country: France
- Region: Normandy
- Department: Eure
- Arrondissement: Bernay
- Canton: Beuzeville

Government
  - Mayor (2020–2026): Caroline Jouas
- Area^{1}: 4.07 km^{2} (1.57 sq mi)
- Elevation: 183 m (600 ft)
- Highest elevation: 197 m (646 ft)
- Lowest elevation: 143 m (469 ft)
- Population (2023): 119
  - Density: 29.2/km^{2} (75.7/sq mi)
- Time zone: UTC+01:00 (CET)
  - Summer (DST): UTC+02:00 (CEST)
- INSEE/Postal code: 27149 /27230
- ^{1} French Land Register data, which excludes lakes, ponds, glaciers > 1 km^{2} (0.386 sq mi or 247 acres) and river estuaries.

La Chapelle-Hareng (French pronunciation: [la ʃapɛl aʁɑ̃]) is a commune in the Eure department in northern France.

== Population ==
Historical population
Year	Pop.	±% p.a.
1968	104	—
1975	94	−1.43%
1982	77	−2.81%
1990	78	+0.16%
1999	79	+0.14%
2007	82	+0.47%
2012	86	+0.96%
2017	100	+3.06%
2023	119	+2.94%
Source: INSEE

== See also ==
- Communes of the Eure department
