= Giverville =

- Commune
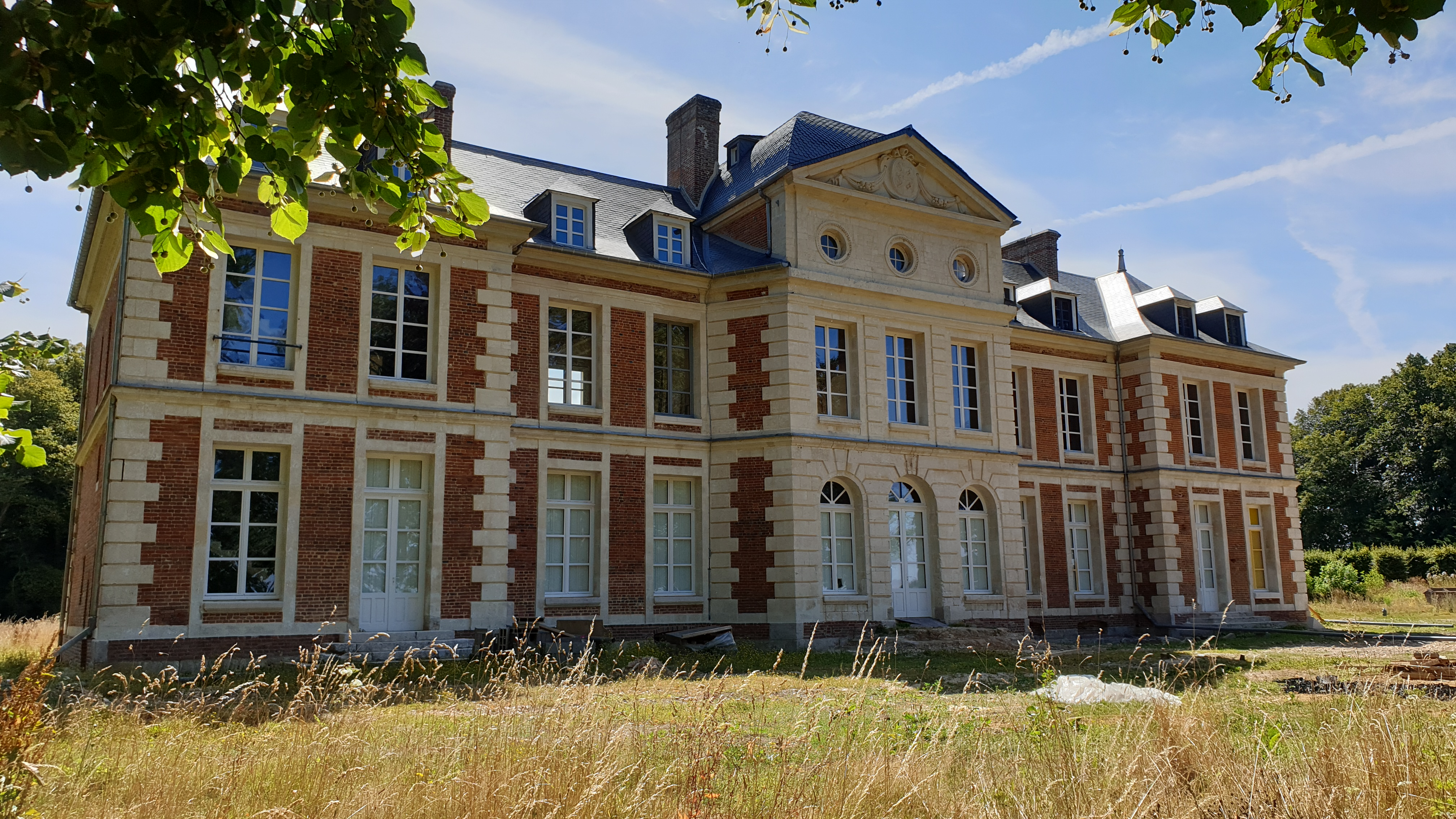
- Castle of Giverville
- Location of Giverville
- Location within France Location within Normandy
- Coordinates: 49°11′48″N 0°34′12″E
- Country: France
- Region: Normandy
- Department: Eure
- Arrondissement: Bernay
- Canton: Beuzeville

Government
  - Mayor (2020–2026): Thierry Parrey
- Area^{1}: 6.14 km^{2} (2.37 sq mi)
- Highest elevation: 176 m (577 ft)
- Lowest elevation: 157 m (515 ft)
- Population (2023): 381
  - Density: 62.1/km^{2} (161/sq mi)
- Time zone: UTC+01:00 (CET)
  - Summer (DST): UTC+02:00 (CEST)
- INSEE/Postal code: 27286 /27560
- ^{1} French Land Register data, which excludes lakes, ponds, glaciers > 1 km^{2} (0.386 sq mi or 247 acres) and river estuaries.

Giverville (French pronunciation: [ʒivɛʁvil]) is a commune in the Eure department in northern France.

== Population ==
Historical population
Year	Pop.	±% p.a.
1968	333	—
1975	358	+1.04%
1982	282	−3.35%
1990	262	−0.92%
1999	270	+0.33%
2007	300	+1.33%
2012	330	+1.92%
2017	400	+3.92%
2023	381	−0.81%
Source: INSEE

== Sights ==
- The château de Giverville is a castle built in the 18th century. It was the ancestral seat of the noble Norman family "de Giverville".

== See also ==
- Communes of the Eure department
