= Folleville, Eure =

Folleville
- Commune
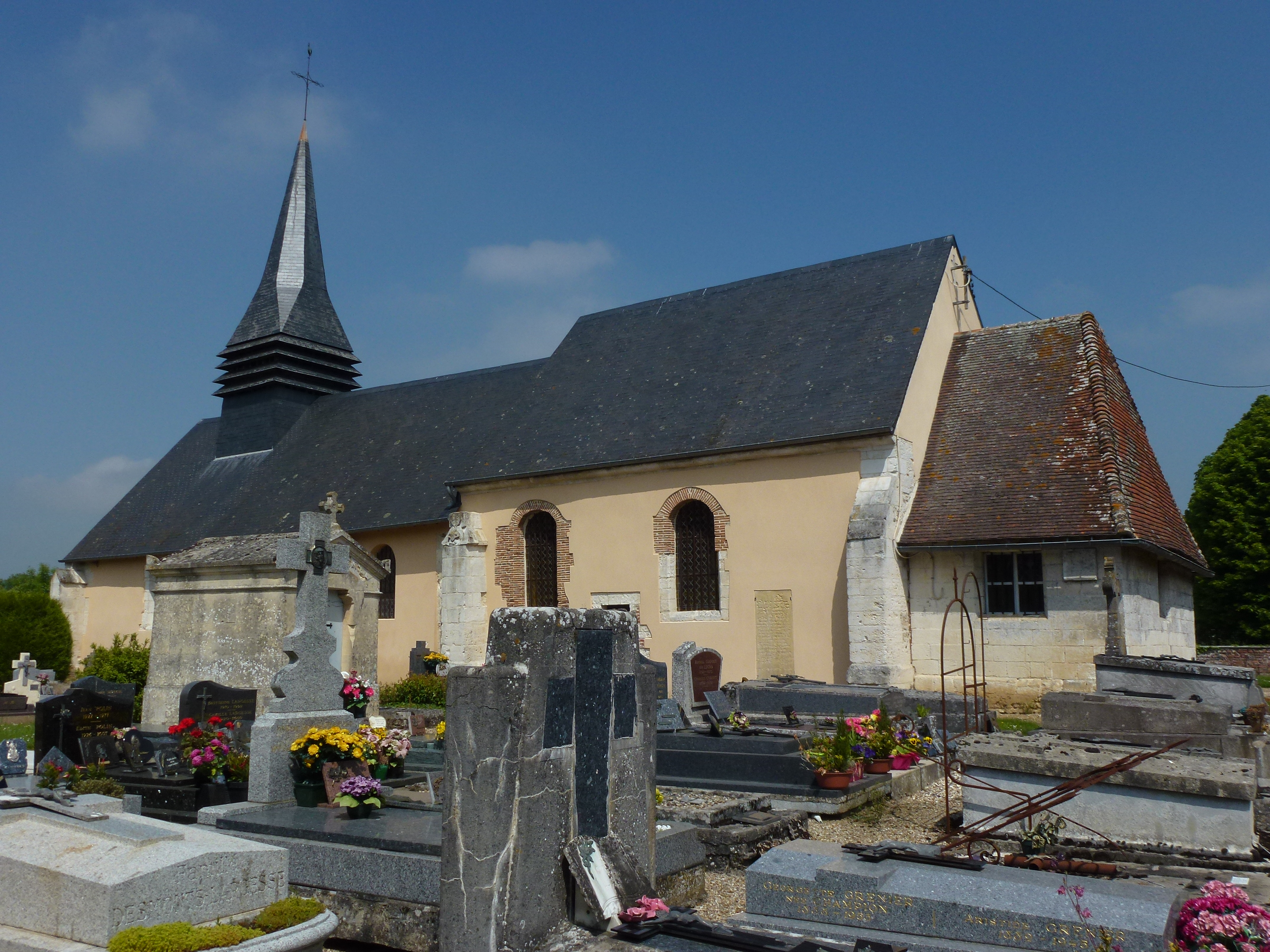
- The church in Folleville
- Location of Folleville
- Location within France Location within Normandy
- Coordinates: 49°09′15″N 0°30′25″E
- Country: France
- Region: Normandy
- Department: Eure
- Arrondissement: Bernay
- Canton: Beuzeville

Government
  - Mayor (2020–2026): Christian Mesniere
- Area^{1}: 6.16 km^{2} (2.38 sq mi)
- Elevation: 180 m (590 ft)
- Highest elevation: 181 m (594 ft)
- Lowest elevation: 168 m (551 ft)
- Population (2023): 193
  - Density: 31.3/km^{2} (81.1/sq mi)
- Time zone: UTC+01:00 (CET)
  - Summer (DST): UTC+02:00 (CEST)
- INSEE/Postal code: 27248 /27230
- ^{1} French Land Register data, which excludes lakes, ponds, glaciers > 1 km^{2} (0.386 sq mi or 247 acres) and river estuaries.

Folleville (French pronunciation: [fɔlvil]) is a commune in Eure, a department in the Normandy region in northern France.

== Population ==
Historical population
Year	Pop.	±% p.a.
1968	230	—
1975	200	−1.98%
1982	193	−0.51%
1990	181	−0.80%
1999	173	−0.50%
2007	186	+0.91%
2012	209	+2.36%
2017	199	−0.98%
2023	193	−0.51%
Source: INSEE

== See also ==
- Communes of the Eure department
