= Fresne-Cauverville =

- Commune
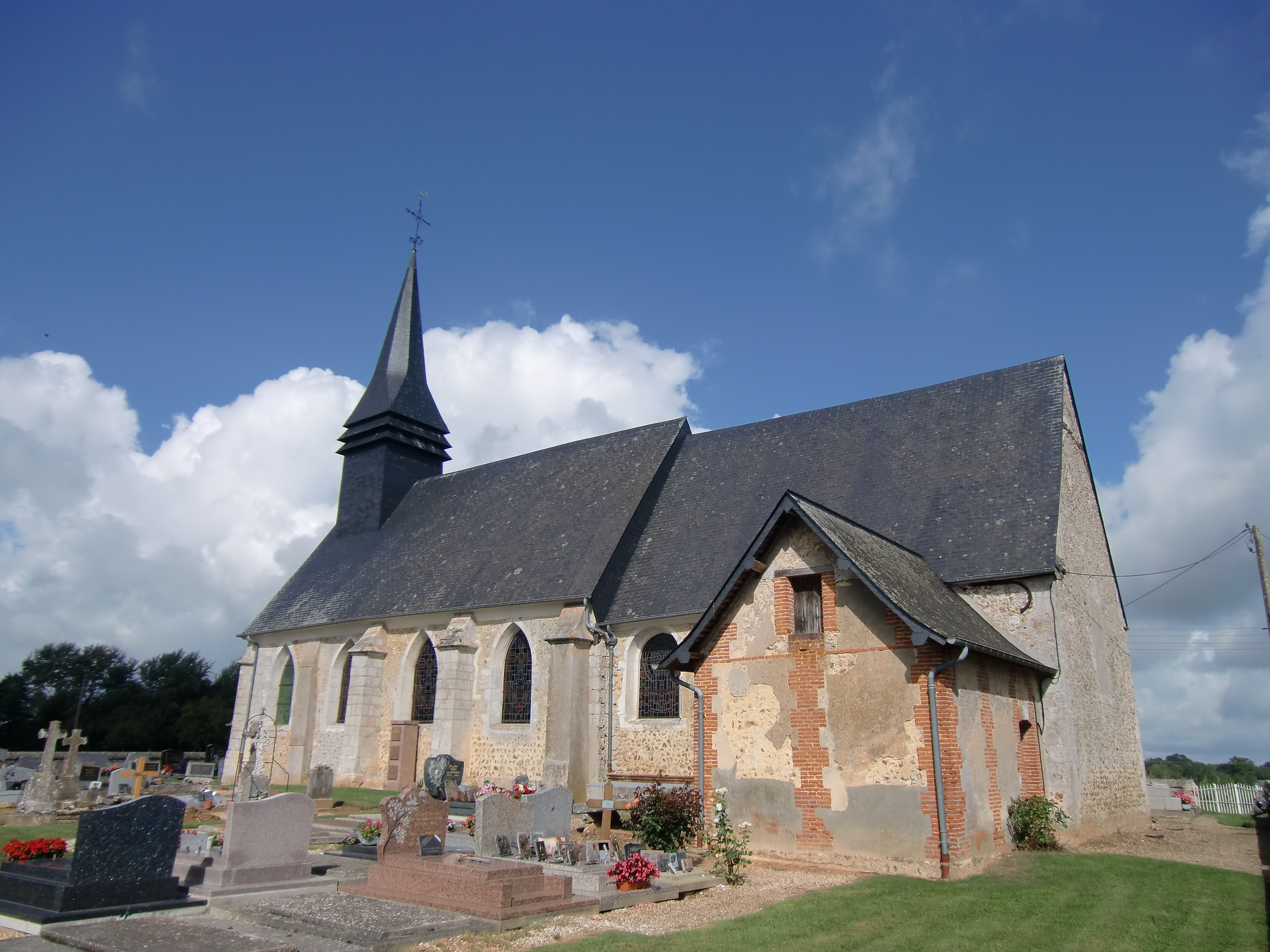
- The church in Fresne-Cauverville
- Location of Fresne-Cauverville
- Location within France Location within Normandy
- Coordinates: 49°12′07″N 0°27′55″E
- Country: France
- Region: Normandy
- Department: Eure
- Arrondissement: Bernay
- Canton: Beuzeville

Government
  - Mayor (2020–2026): Didier Tréfouel
- Area^{1}: 6.15 km^{2} (2.37 sq mi)
- Elevation: 165 m (541 ft)
- Highest elevation: 173 m (568 ft)
- Lowest elevation: 123 m (404 ft)
- Population (2023): 189
  - Density: 30.7/km^{2} (79.6/sq mi)
- Time zone: UTC+01:00 (CET)
  - Summer (DST): UTC+02:00 (CEST)
- INSEE/Postal code: 27269 /27260
- ^{1} French Land Register data, which excludes lakes, ponds, glaciers > 1 km^{2} (0.386 sq mi or 247 acres) and river estuaries.

Fresne-Cauverville (French pronunciation: [fʁɛn kovɛʁvil]) is a commune in the Eure department in the Normandy region in northern France.

== Population ==
Historical population
Year	Pop.	±% p.a.
1968	158	—
1975	154	−0.37%
1982	171	+1.51%
1990	171	+0.00%
1999	161	−0.67%
2007	195	+2.42%
2012	206	+1.10%
2017	196	−0.99%
2023	189	−0.60%
Source: INSEE

== See also ==
- Communes of the Eure department
