= Fort-Moville =

- Commune
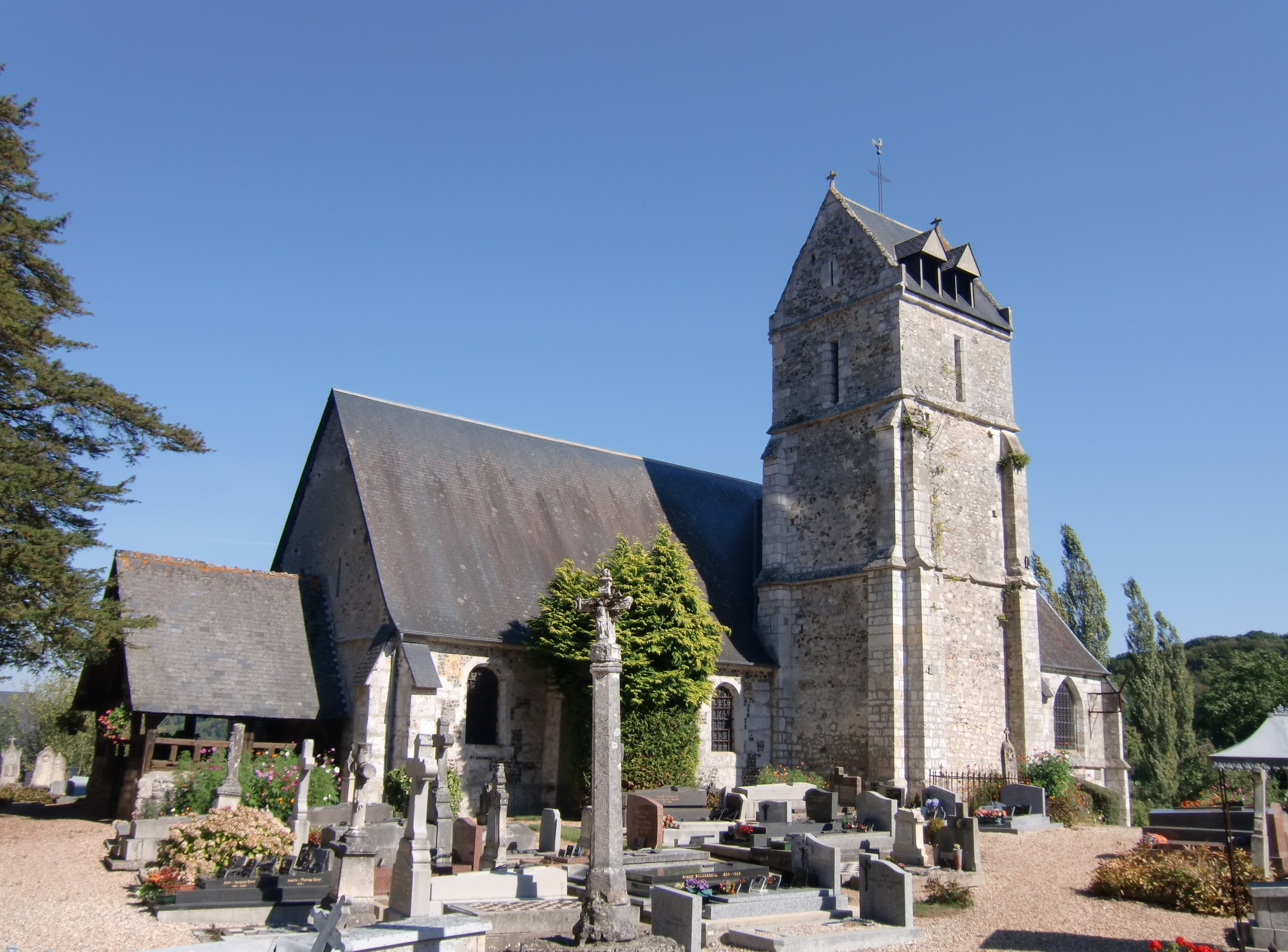
- The church in Fort-Moville

- Coat of arms
- Location of Fort-Moville
- Location within France Location within Normandy
- Coordinates: 49°20′03″N 0°25′11″E
- Country: France
- Region: Normandy
- Department: Eure
- Arrondissement: Bernay
- Canton: Beuzeville

Government
  - Mayor (2020–2026): Philippe Marmion
- Area^{1}: 9.32 km^{2} (3.60 sq mi)
- Elevation: 60 m (200 ft)
- Highest elevation: 142 m (466 ft)
- Lowest elevation: 38 m (125 ft)
- Population (2023): 501
  - Density: 53.8/km^{2} (139/sq mi)
- Time zone: UTC+01:00 (CET)
  - Summer (DST): UTC+02:00 (CEST)
- INSEE/Postal code: 27258 /27210
- ^{1} French Land Register data, which excludes lakes, ponds, glaciers > 1 km^{2} (0.386 sq mi or 247 acres) and river estuaries.

Fort-Moville is a commune in the Eure department in the Normandy region in northern France.

== Population ==
Historical population
Year	Pop.	±% p.a.
1968	266	—
1975	241	−1.40%
1982	244	+0.18%
1990	261	+0.85%
1999	312	+2.00%
2007	376	+2.36%
2012	437	+3.05%
2017	500	+2.73%
2023	501	+0.03%
Source: INSEE

== See also ==
- Communes of the Eure department
