= Canton of Beuzeville =

Coordinates: 49°22′N 0°22′E

Beuzeville
- Canton
- Interactive map of Beuzeville
- Country: France
- Region: Normandy
- Department: Eure
- No. of communes: 61
- Area: 514.99 km^{2} (198.84 sq mi)
- Population (2023): 31,794
  - Density: 61.737/km^{2} (159.90/sq mi)
- INSEE code: 2703

The Canton of Beuzeville is a canton of the département of Eure, in France. At the French canton reorganisation which came into effect in March 2015, the canton was expanded from 16 to 62 communes (2 of which were merged into the new commune Le Mesnil-Saint-Jean):

- Asnières
- Bailleul-la-Vallée
- Barville
- Bazoques
- Berville-sur-Mer
- Beuzeville
- Le Bois-Hellain
- Boissy-Lamberville
- Boulleville
- Bournainville-Faverolles
- La Chapelle-Bayvel
- La Chapelle-Hareng
- Conteville
- Cormeilles
- Drucourt
- Duranville
- Épaignes
- Épreville-en-Lieuvin
- Fatouville-Grestain
- Le Favril
- Fiquefleur-Équainville
- Folleville
- Fontaine-la-Louvet
- Fort-Moville
- Foulbec
- Fresne-Cauverville
- Giverville
- Heudreville-en-Lieuvin
- La Lande-Saint-Léger
- Lieurey
- Manneville-la-Raoult
- Martainville
- Le Mesnil-Saint-Jean
- Morainville-Jouveaux
- Noards
- La Noë-Poulain
- Piencourt
- Les Places
- Le Planquay
- La Poterie-Mathieu
- Saint-Aubin-de-Scellon
- Saint-Benoît-des-Ombres
- Saint-Christophe-sur-Condé
- Saint-Étienne-l'Allier
- Saint-Georges-du-Vièvre
- Saint-Germain-la-Campagne
- Saint-Grégoire-du-Vièvre
- Saint-Maclou
- Saint-Mards-de-Fresne
- Saint-Martin-Saint-Firmin
- Saint-Pierre-de-Cormeilles
- Saint-Pierre-des-Ifs
- Saint-Pierre-du-Val
- Saint-Siméon
- Saint-Sulpice-de-Grimbouville
- Saint-Sylvestre-de-Cormeilles
- Saint-Vincent-du-Boulay
- Le Theil-Nolent
- Thiberville
- Le Torpt
- Vannecrocq

Beuzeville itself is about 10 miles from Honfleur, and 18 miles from Deauville. It has the sea to the North, and the Seine estuary to the East. Although just outside the département of Calvados, the production of the apple brandy known as Calvados is also produced there, and is the reason for the many apple orchards which are a distinguishing characteristic of the surrounding countryside. Agriculture and tourism are the main industries.
