= La Chapelle-Bayvel =

- Commune
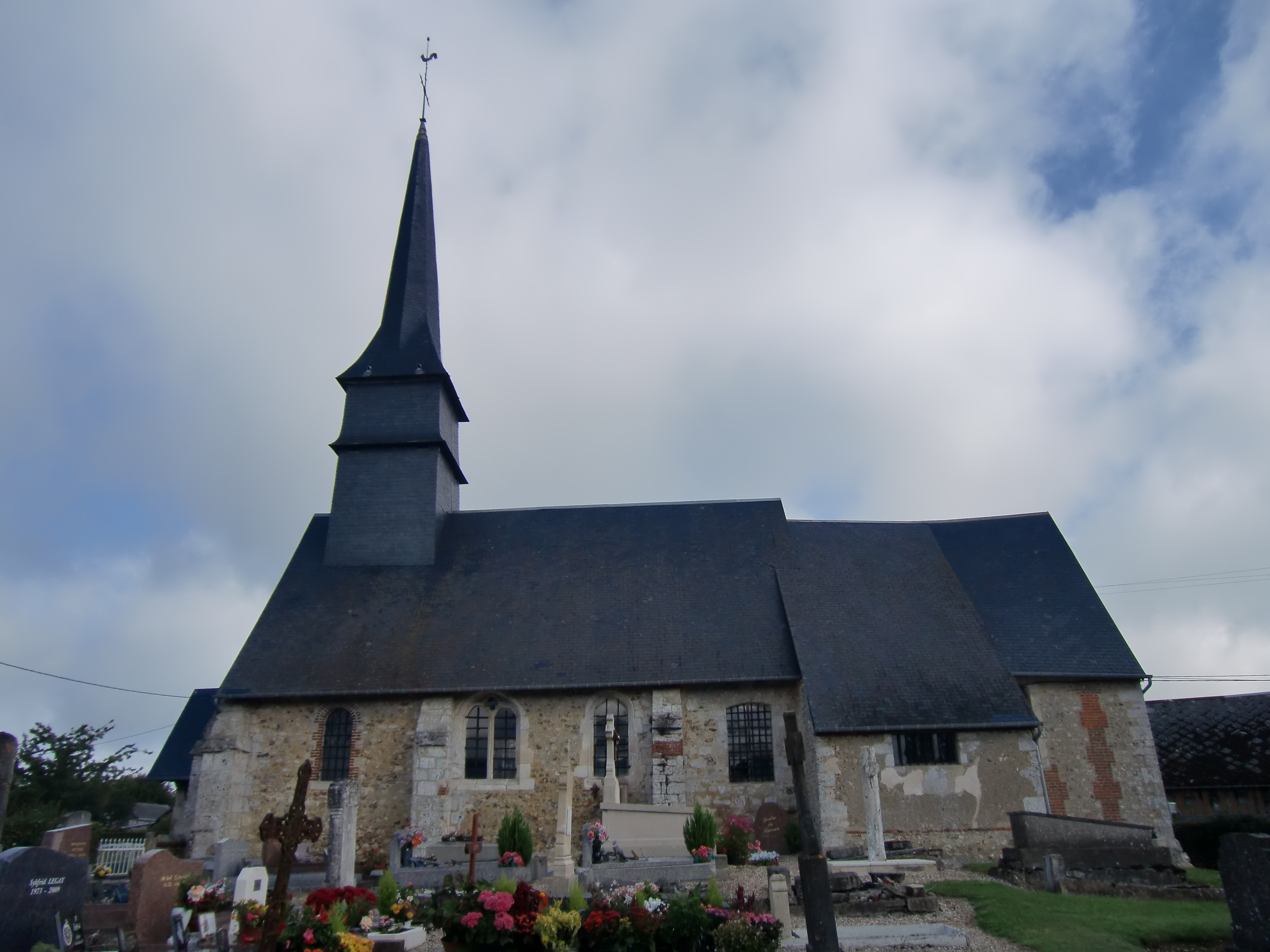
- The church in La Chapelle-Bayvel
- Location of La Chapelle-Bayvel
- Location within France Location within Normandy
- Coordinates: 49°16′22″N 0°24′13″E
- Country: France
- Region: Normandy
- Department: Eure
- Arrondissement: Bernay
- Canton: Beuzeville

Government
  - Mayor (2020–2026): Jacques Duval
- Area^{1}: 4.84 km^{2} (1.87 sq mi)
- Elevation: 156 m (512 ft)
- Highest elevation: 163 m (535 ft)
- Lowest elevation: 69 m (226 ft)
- Population (2023): 387
  - Density: 80.0/km^{2} (207/sq mi)
- Time zone: UTC+01:00 (CET)
  - Summer (DST): UTC+02:00 (CEST)
- INSEE/Postal code: 27146 /27260
- ^{1} French Land Register data, which excludes lakes, ponds, glaciers > 1 km^{2} (0.386 sq mi or 247 acres) and river estuaries.

La Chapelle-Bayvel (French pronunciation: [la ʃapɛl bɛvɛl]) is a commune in the Eure department in northern France.

== Population ==
Historical population
Year	Pop.	±% p.a.
1968	195	—
1975	211	+1.13%
1982	206	−0.34%
1990	189	−1.07%
1999	216	+1.49%
2007	304	+4.36%
2012	364	+3.67%
2017	386	+1.18%
2023	387	+0.04%
Source: INSEE

== See also ==
- Communes of the Eure department
