= Piencourt =

- Commune
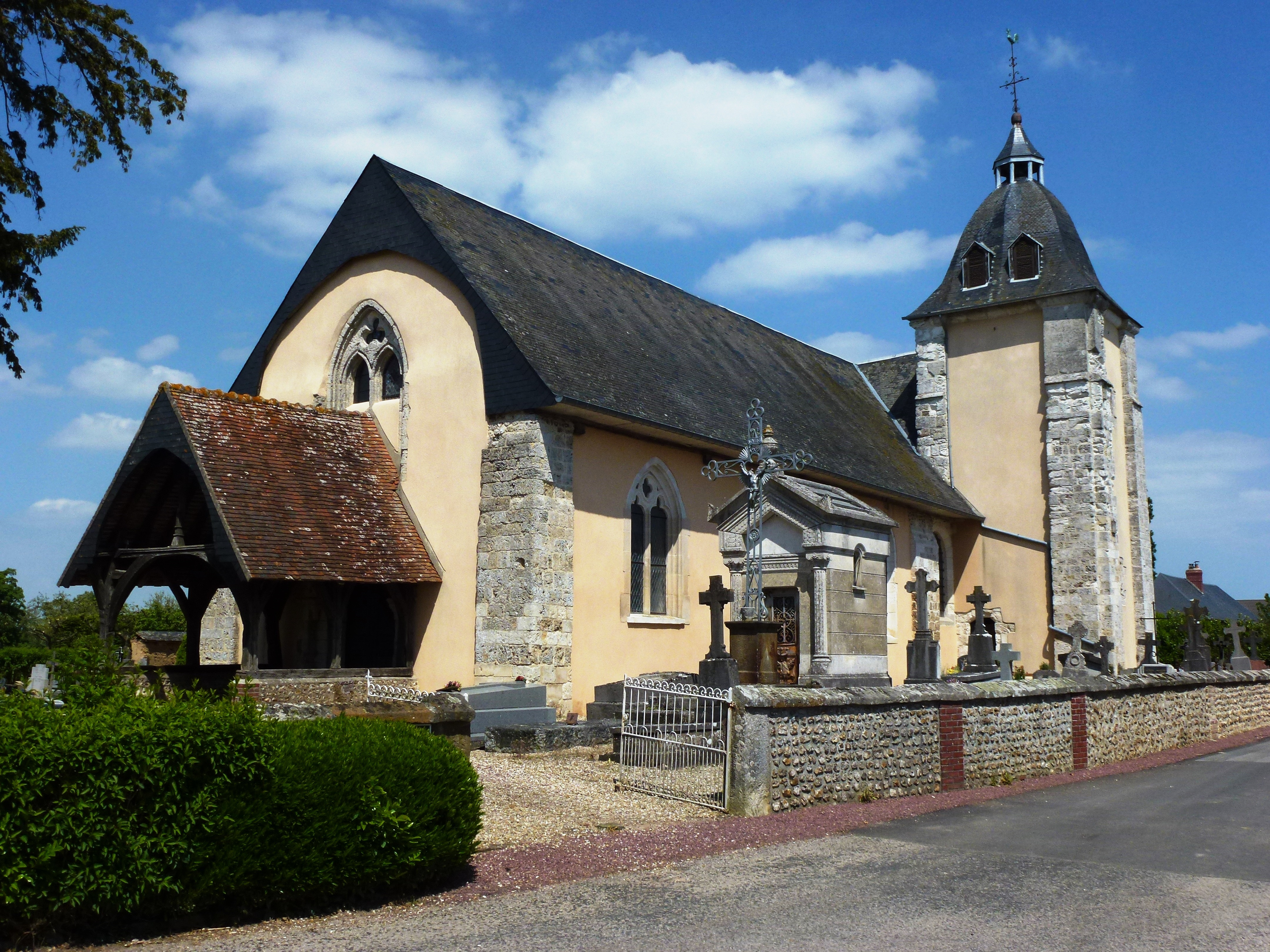
- The church in Piencourt
- Location of Piencourt
- Location within France Location within Normandy
- Coordinates: 49°10′04″N 0°24′00″E
- Country: France
- Region: Normandy
- Department: Eure
- Arrondissement: Bernay
- Canton: Beuzeville

Government
  - Mayor (2020–2026): Loïse Vermeulen
- Area^{1}: 8.7 km^{2} (3.4 sq mi)
- Elevation: 174 m (571 ft)
- Highest elevation: 171 m (561 ft)
- Lowest elevation: 125 m (410 ft)
- Population (2023): 170
  - Density: 20/km^{2} (51/sq mi)
- Time zone: UTC+01:00 (CET)
  - Summer (DST): UTC+02:00 (CEST)
- INSEE/Postal code: 27455 /27230
- ^{1} French Land Register data, which excludes lakes, ponds, glaciers > 1 km^{2} (0.386 sq mi or 247 acres) and river estuaries.

Piencourt (French pronunciation: [pjɛ̃kuʁ]) is a commune in the Eure department in Normandy in northern France.

== Population ==
Historical population
Year	Pop.	±% p.a.
1968	173	—
1975	160	−1.11%
1982	134	−2.50%
1990	156	+1.92%
1999	147	−0.66%
2007	155	+0.66%
2012	168	+1.62%
2017	155	−1.60%
2023	170	+1.55%
Source: INSEE

== See also ==
- Communes of the Eure department
