= Saint-Vincent-du-Boulay =

- Commune
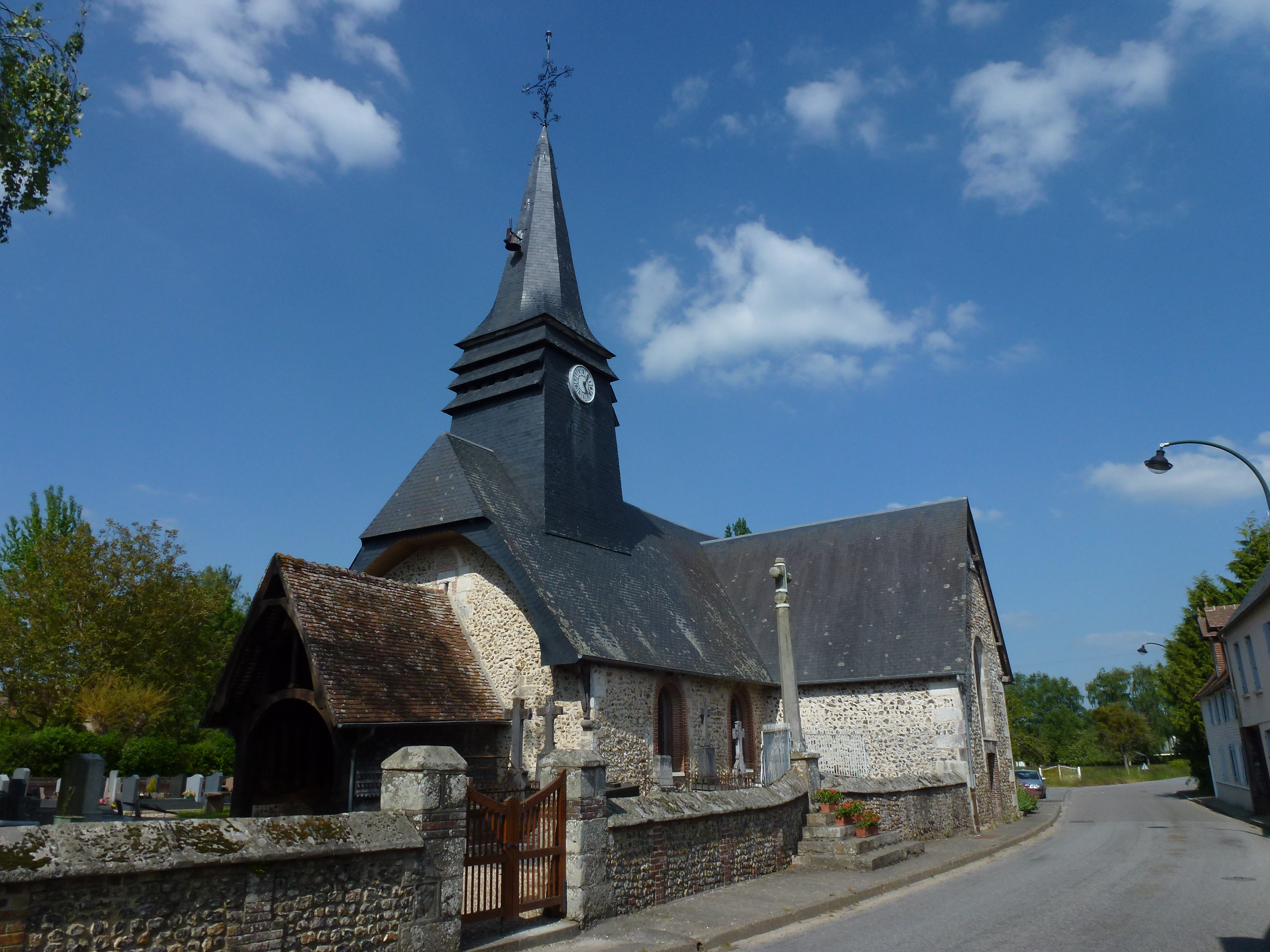
- The church in Saint-Vincent-du-Boulay
- Location of Saint-Vincent-du-Boulay
- Location within France Location within Normandy
- Coordinates: 49°06′14″N 0°29′26″E
- Country: France
- Region: Normandy
- Department: Eure
- Arrondissement: Bernay
- Canton: Beuzeville

Government
  - Mayor (2020–2026): Christian Famery
- Area^{1}: 6.56 km^{2} (2.53 sq mi)
- Elevation: 185 m (607 ft)
- Highest elevation: 195 m (640 ft)
- Lowest elevation: 164 m (538 ft)
- Population (2023): 366
  - Density: 55.8/km^{2} (145/sq mi)
- Time zone: UTC+01:00 (CET)
  - Summer (DST): UTC+02:00 (CEST)
- INSEE/Postal code: 27613 /27230
- ^{1} French Land Register data, which excludes lakes, ponds, glaciers > 1 km^{2} (0.386 sq mi or 247 acres) and river estuaries.

Saint-Vincent-du-Boulay (French pronunciation: [sɛ̃ vɛ̃sɑ̃ dy bulɛ]) is a commune in the Eure department in Normandy in northern France.

== Population ==
Historical population
Year	Pop.	±% p.a.
1968	231	—
1975	220	−0.69%
1982	258	+2.30%
1990	263	+0.24%
1999	267	+0.17%
2007	278	+0.51%
2012	333	+3.68%
2017	381	+2.73%
2023	366	−0.67%
Source: INSEE

== See also ==
- Communes of the Eure department
