= Saint-Grégoire-du-Vièvre =

- Commune
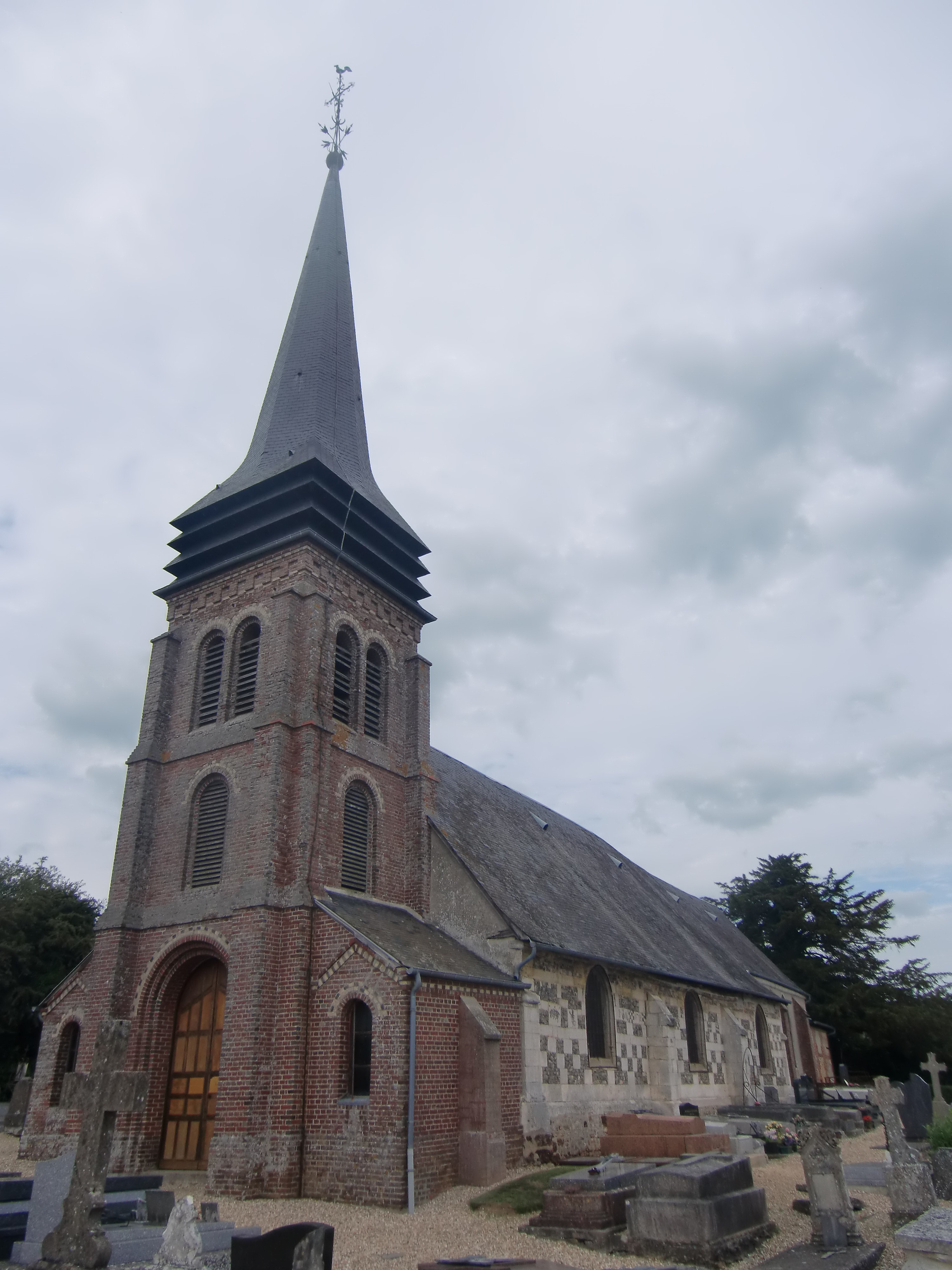
- The church in Saint-Grégoire-du-Vièvre
- Location of Saint-Grégoire-du-Vièvre
- Location within France Location within Normandy
- Coordinates: 49°14′40″N 0°38′11″E
- Country: France
- Region: Normandy
- Department: Eure
- Arrondissement: Bernay
- Canton: Beuzeville

Government
  - Mayor (2020–2026): Joël Dorléans
- Area^{1}: 8.97 km^{2} (3.46 sq mi)
- Elevation: 134 m (440 ft)
- Highest elevation: 167 m (548 ft)
- Lowest elevation: 67 m (220 ft)
- Population (2023): 315
  - Density: 35.1/km^{2} (91.0/sq mi)
- Time zone: UTC+01:00 (CET)
  - Summer (DST): UTC+02:00 (CEST)
- INSEE/Postal code: 27550 /27450
- ^{1} French Land Register data, which excludes lakes, ponds, glaciers > 1 km^{2} (0.386 sq mi or 247 acres) and river estuaries.

Saint-Grégoire-du-Vièvre (French pronunciation: [sɛ̃ ɡʁeɡwaʁ dy vjɛvʁ]) is a commune in the Eure department in Normandy, northern France.

== Population ==
Historical population
Year	Pop.	±% p.a.
1968	280	—
1975	283	+0.15%
1982	301	+0.88%
1990	330	+1.16%
1999	323	−0.24%
2007	335	+0.46%
2012	341	+0.36%
2017	318	−1.39%
2023	315	−0.16%
Source: INSEE

== See also ==
- Communes of the Eure department
