= Morainville-Jouveaux =

- Commune
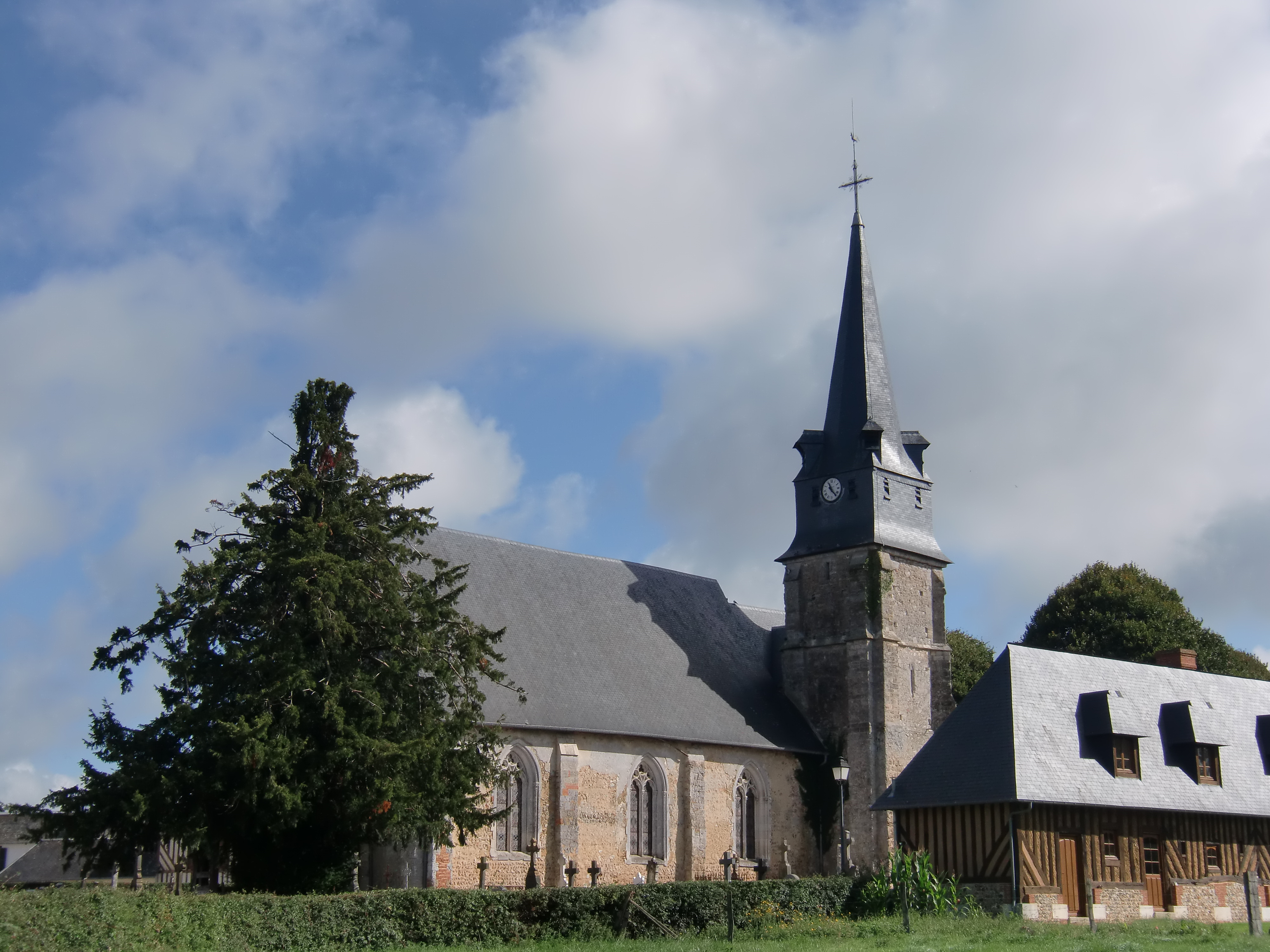
- The church in Morainville
- Location of Morainville-Jouveaux
- Location within France Location within Normandy
- Coordinates: 49°13′21″N 0°26′47″E
- Country: France
- Region: Normandy
- Department: Eure
- Arrondissement: Bernay
- Canton: Beuzeville
- Intercommunality: Lieuvin Pays d'Auge

Government
  - Mayor (2020–2026): Jacques Enos
- Area^{1}: 15.39 km^{2} (5.94 sq mi)
- Elevation: 168 m (551 ft)
- Highest elevation: 171 m (561 ft)
- Lowest elevation: 90 m (300 ft)
- Population (2023): 375
  - Density: 24.4/km^{2} (63.1/sq mi)
- Time zone: UTC+01:00 (CET)
  - Summer (DST): UTC+02:00 (CEST)
- INSEE/Postal code: 27415 /27260
- ^{1} French Land Register data, which excludes lakes, ponds, glaciers > 1 km^{2} (0.386 sq mi or 247 acres) and river estuaries.

Morainville-Jouveaux (French pronunciation: [mɔʁɛ̃vil ʒuvo]) is a commune in the Eure department in Normandy in northern France.

== See also ==
- Communes of the Eure department
