= Bazoques =

- Commune
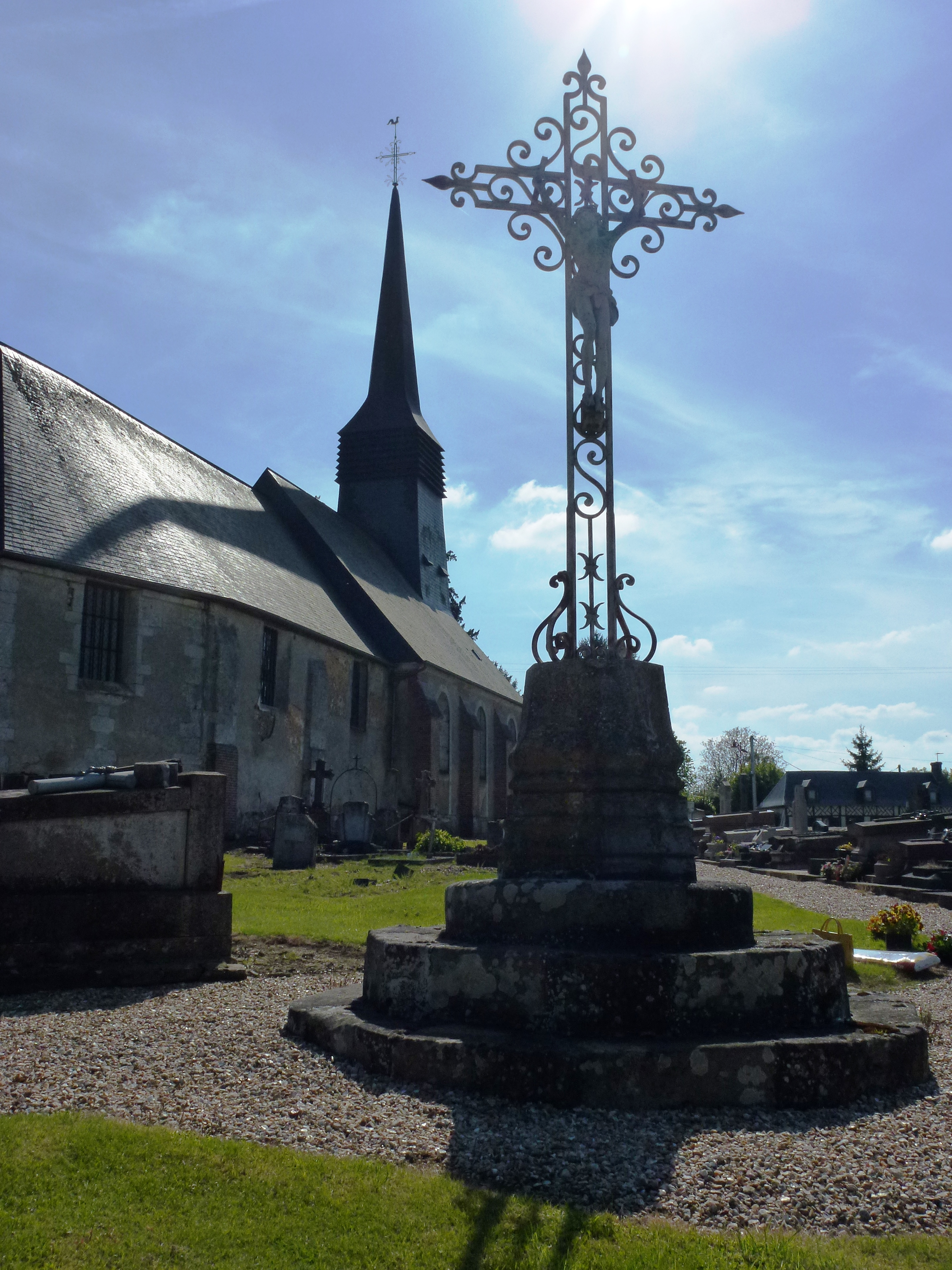
- The church and cross in Bazoques
- Location of Bazoques
- Location within France Location within Normandy
- Coordinates: 49°10′16″N 0°33′01″E
- Country: France
- Region: Normandy
- Department: Eure
- Arrondissement: Bernay
- Canton: Beuzeville

Government
  - Mayor (2020–2026): François Jourdan
- Area^{1}: 6.9 km^{2} (2.7 sq mi)
- Elevation: 182 m (597 ft)
- Highest elevation: 182 m (597 ft)
- Lowest elevation: 169 m (554 ft)
- Population (2023): 141
  - Density: 20/km^{2} (53/sq mi)
- Time zone: UTC+01:00 (CET)
  - Summer (DST): UTC+02:00 (CEST)
- INSEE/Postal code: 27046 /27230
- ^{1} French Land Register data, which excludes lakes, ponds, glaciers > 1 km^{2} (0.386 sq mi or 247 acres) and river estuaries.

Bazoques (French pronunciation: [bazɔk]) is a commune in the Eure department in northern France.

== Population ==
Historical population
Year	Pop.	±% p.a.
1968	180	—
1975	134	−4.13%
1982	127	−0.76%
1990	122	−0.50%
1999	136	+1.21%
2007	147	+0.98%
2012	169	+2.83%
2017	161	−0.97%
2023	141	−2.19%
Source: INSEE

== Personalities ==
Louis-François de Livet, Marquis de Barville, was buried in Bazoques in 1789.

== See also ==
- Communes of the Eure department
