= Le Theil-Nolent =

- Commune
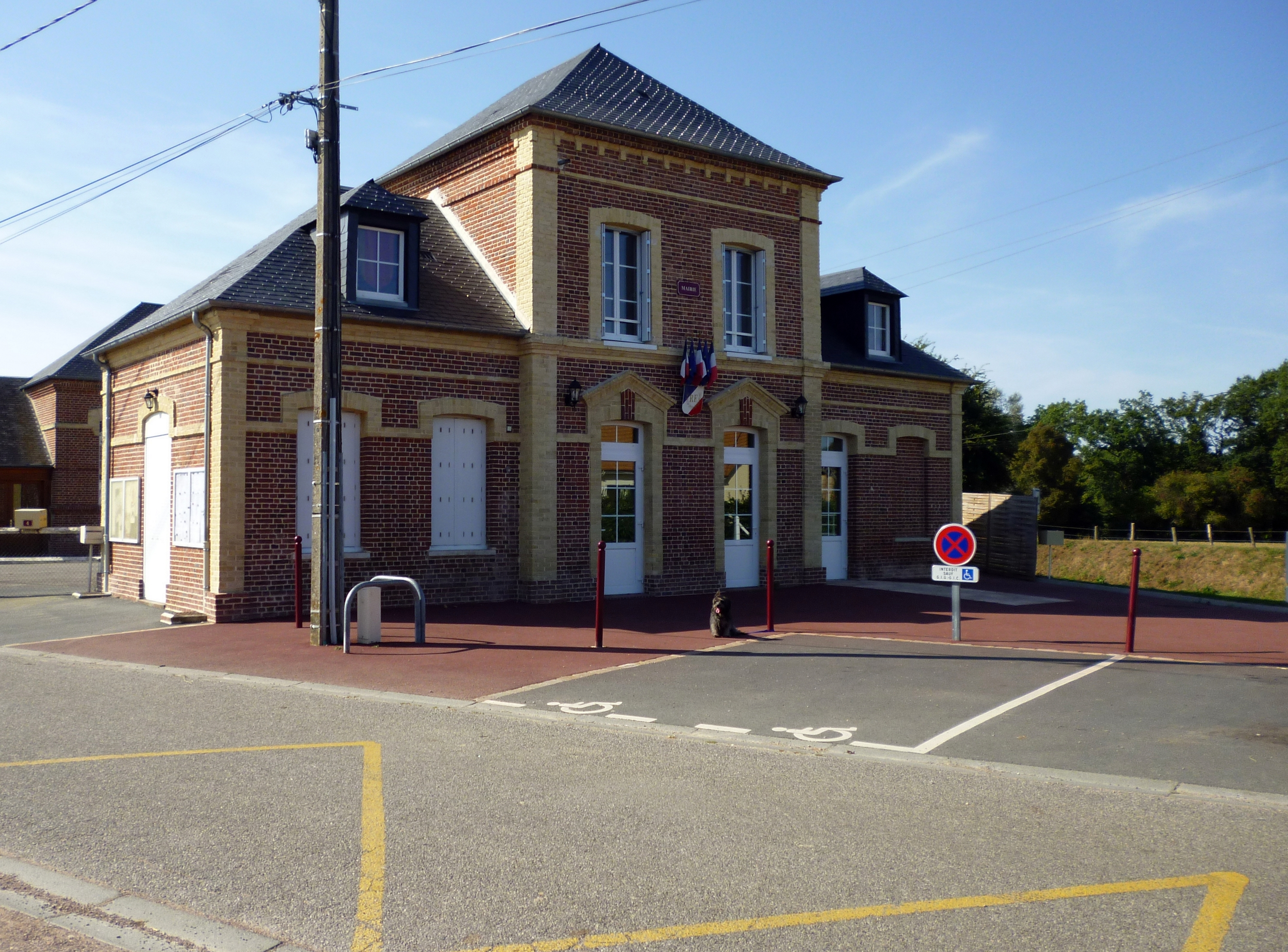
- Town hall
- Location of Le Theil-Nolent
- Location within France Location within Normandy
- Coordinates: 49°09′17″N 0°32′22″E
- Country: France
- Region: Normandy
- Department: Eure
- Arrondissement: Bernay
- Canton: Beuzeville

Government
  - Mayor (2020–2026): Philippe Touzé
- Area^{1}: 4.11 km^{2} (1.59 sq mi)
- Elevation: 183 m (600 ft)
- Highest elevation: 181 m (594 ft)
- Lowest elevation: 167 m (548 ft)
- Population (2023): 285
  - Density: 69.3/km^{2} (180/sq mi)
- Time zone: UTC+01:00 (CET)
  - Summer (DST): UTC+02:00 (CEST)
- INSEE/Postal code: 27627 /27230
- ^{1} French Land Register data, which excludes lakes, ponds, glaciers > 1 km^{2} (0.386 sq mi or 247 acres) and river estuaries.

Le Theil-Nolent (French pronunciation: [lə tɛj nɔlɑ̃]) is a commune in the Eure department in Normandy in northern France.

== Population ==
Historical population
Year	Pop.	±% p.a.
1968	164	—
1975	155	−0.80%
1982	157	+0.18%
1990	173	+1.22%
1999	186	+0.81%
2007	203	+1.10%
2012	246	+3.92%
2017	250	+0.32%
2023	285	+2.21%
Source: INSEE

== See also ==
- Communes of the Eure department
