= Martainville =

Martainville may refer to the communes in France:

- Martainville, Calvados
- Martainville, Eure
- Martainville-Épreville
