= Les Places =

- Commune
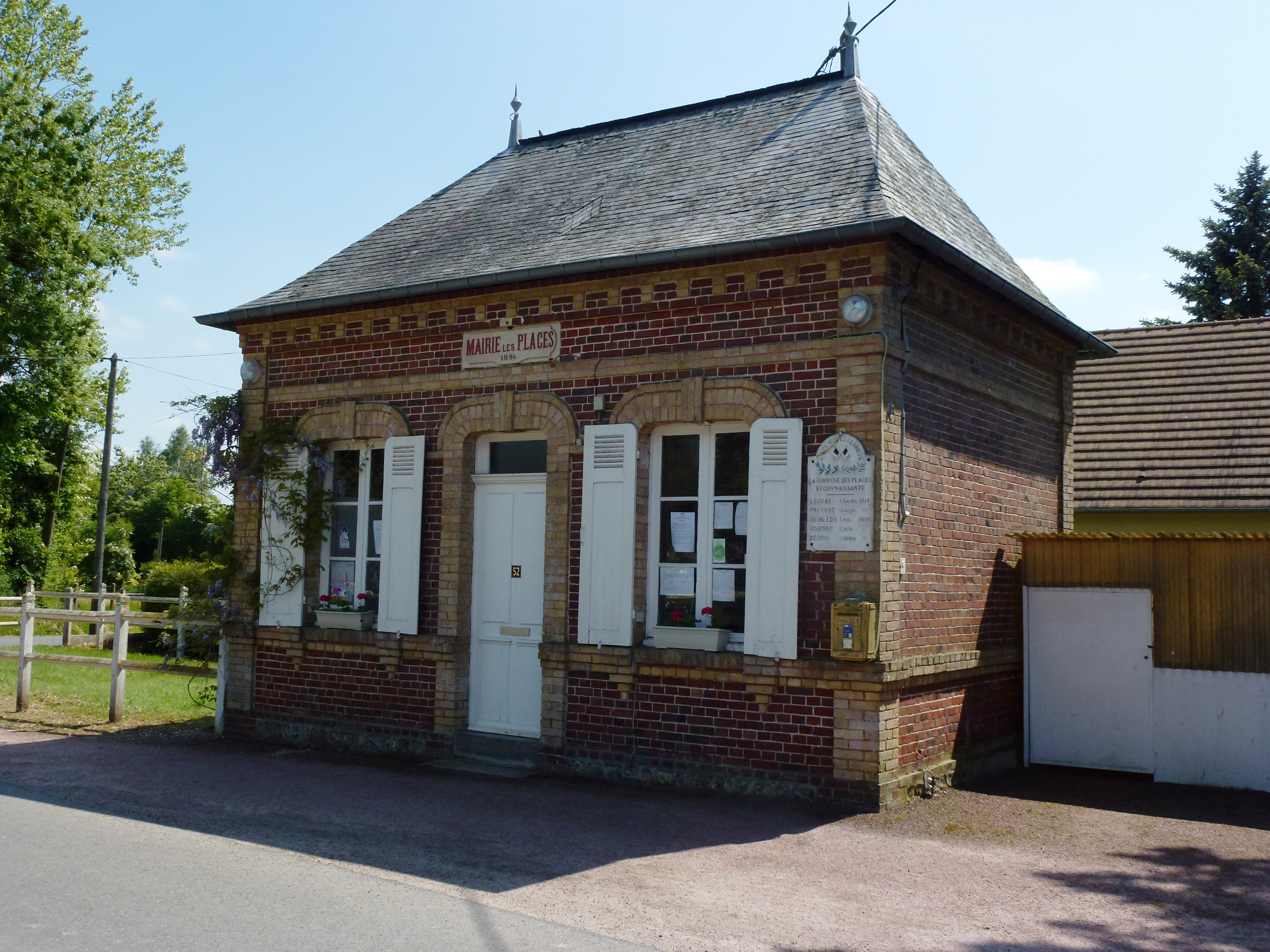
- Town hall
- Location of Les Places
- Location within France Location within Normandy
- Coordinates: 49°09′11″N 0°24′55″E
- Country: France
- Region: Normandy
- Department: Eure
- Arrondissement: Bernay
- Canton: Beuzeville

Government
  - Mayor (2020–2026): Michel Deschamps
- Area^{1}: 1.93 km^{2} (0.75 sq mi)
- Highest elevation: 173 m (568 ft)
- Lowest elevation: 140 m (460 ft)
- Population (2023): 73
  - Density: 38/km^{2} (98/sq mi)
- Time zone: UTC+01:00 (CET)
  - Summer (DST): UTC+02:00 (CEST)
- INSEE/Postal code: 27459 /27230
- ^{1} French Land Register data, which excludes lakes, ponds, glaciers > 1 km^{2} (0.386 sq mi or 247 acres) and river estuaries.

Les Places is a commune in the Eure department in Normandy in northern France.

== Population ==
Historical population
Year	Pop.	±% p.a.
1968	47	—
1975	53	+1.73%
1982	56	+0.79%
1990	56	+0.00%
1999	55	−0.20%
2007	79	+4.63%
2012	73	−1.57%
2017	78	+1.33%
2023	73	−1.10%
Source: INSEE

== See also ==
- Communes of the Eure department
