= Saint-Benoît-des-Ombres =

- Commune
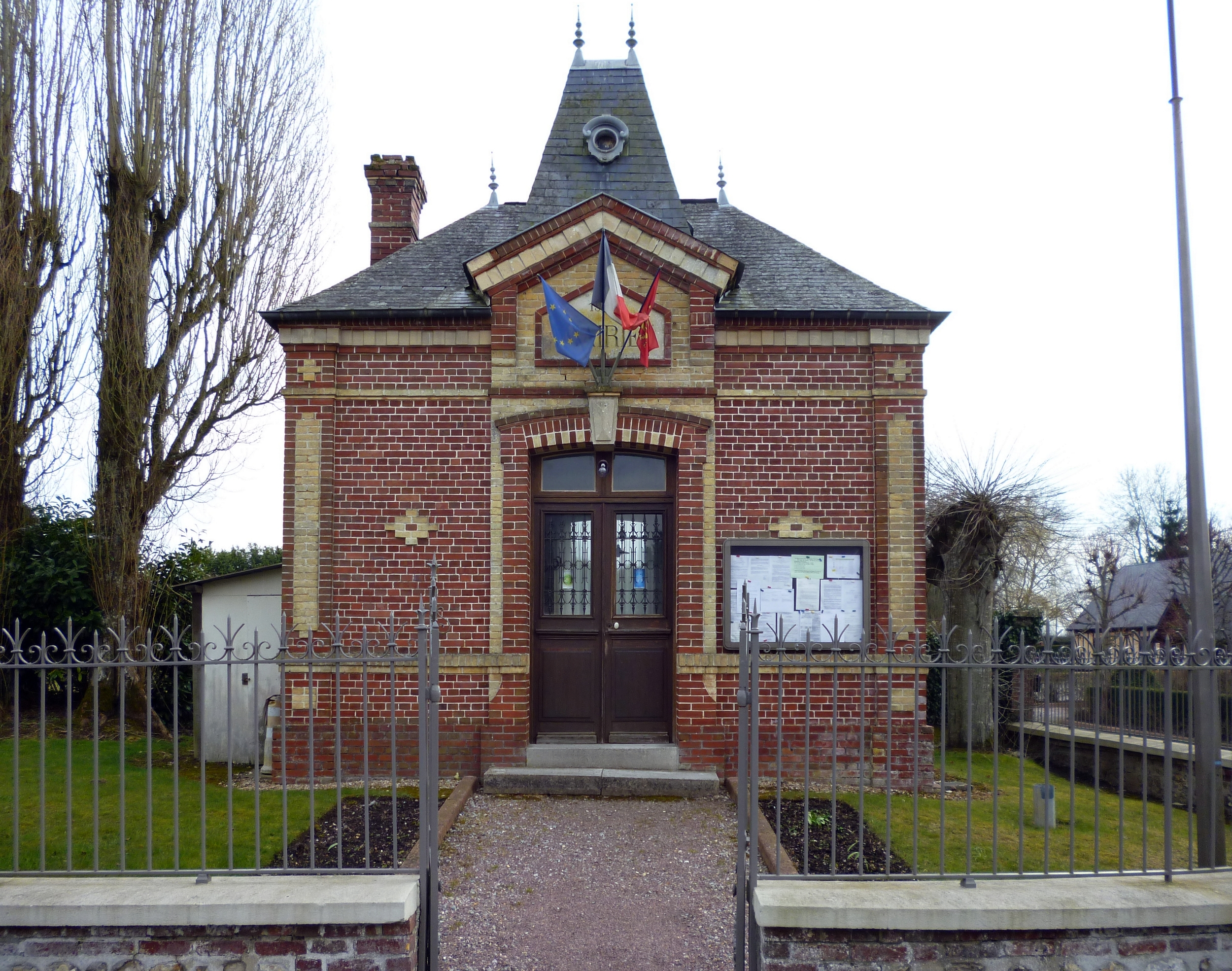
- Town hall
- Location of Saint-Benoît-des-Ombres
- Location within France Location within Normandy
- Coordinates: 49°13′55″N 0°37′23″E
- Country: France
- Region: Normandy
- Department: Eure
- Arrondissement: Bernay
- Canton: Beuzeville

Government
  - Mayor (2020–2026): James Duclos
- Area^{1}: 3.63 km^{2} (1.40 sq mi)
- Elevation: 144 m (472 ft)
- Highest elevation: 145 m (476 ft)
- Lowest elevation: 85 m (279 ft)
- Population (2023): 143
  - Density: 39.4/km^{2} (102/sq mi)
- Time zone: UTC+01:00 (CET)
  - Summer (DST): UTC+02:00 (CEST)
- INSEE/Postal code: 27520 /27450
- ^{1} French Land Register data, which excludes lakes, ponds, glaciers > 1 km^{2} (0.386 sq mi or 247 acres) and river estuaries.

Saint-Benoît-des-Ombres (French pronunciation: [sɛ̃ bənwa de.z‿ɔ̃bʁ]) is a commune in the Eure department in Normandy in north-western France.

== Population ==
Historical population
Year	Pop.	±% p.a.
1968	116	—
1975	105	−1.41%
1982	114	+1.18%
1990	101	−1.50%
1999	105	+0.43%
2007	108	+0.35%
2012	121	+2.30%
2017	143	+3.40%
2023	143	+0.00%
Source: INSEE

== See also ==
- Communes of the Eure department
