= Fontaine-la-Louvet =

- Commune
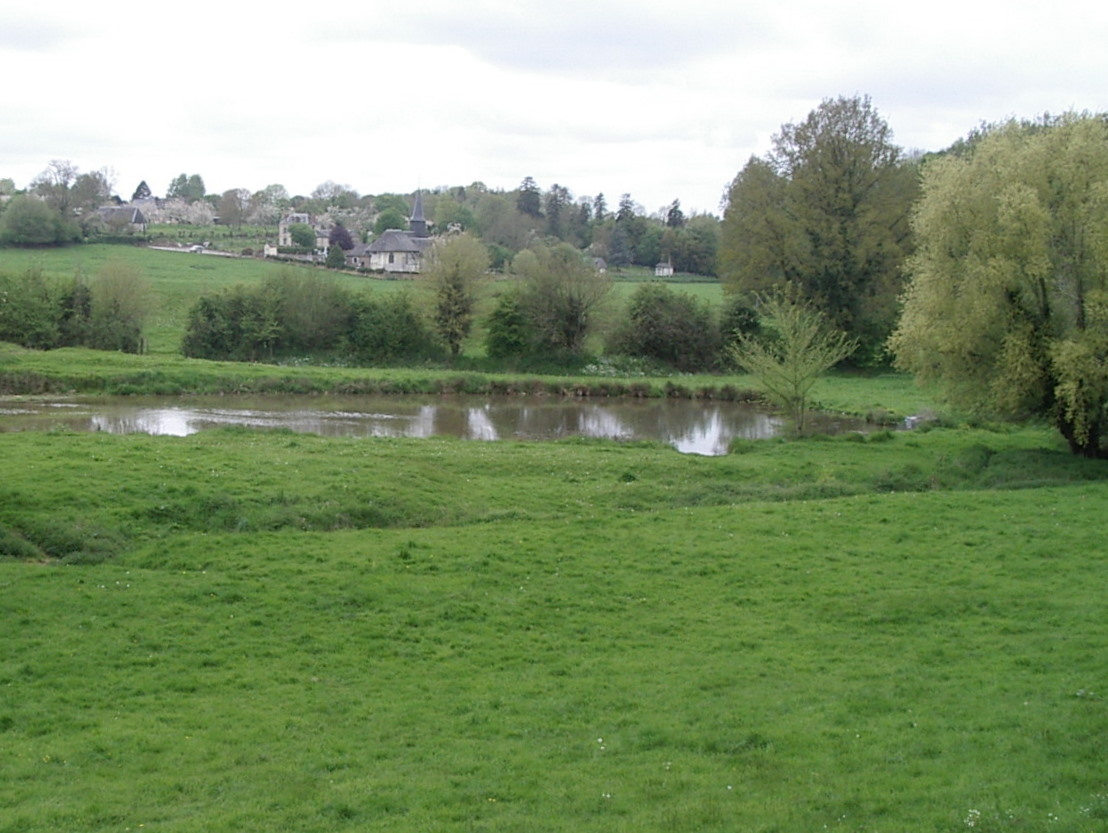
- A general view of Fontaine-la-Louvet
- Location of Fontaine-la-Louvet
- Location within France Location within Normandy
- Coordinates: 49°09′57″N 0°26′57″E
- Country: France
- Region: Normandy
- Department: Eure
- Arrondissement: Bernay
- Canton: Beuzeville

Government
  - Mayor (2020–2026): Arnaud Guichard
- Area^{1}: 11.11 km^{2} (4.29 sq mi)
- Elevation: 100 m (330 ft)
- Highest elevation: 176 m (577 ft)
- Lowest elevation: 117 m (384 ft)
- Population (2023): 351
  - Density: 31.6/km^{2} (81.8/sq mi)
- Time zone: UTC+01:00 (CET)
  - Summer (DST): UTC+02:00 (CEST)
- INSEE/Postal code: 27252 /27230
- ^{1} French Land Register data, which excludes lakes, ponds, glaciers > 1 km^{2} (0.386 sq mi or 247 acres) and river estuaries.

Fontaine-la-Louvet (French pronunciation: [fɔ̃tɛn la luvɛ]) is a commune in the Eure department in the Normandy region in northern France.

== Population ==
Historical population
Year	Pop.	±% p.a.
1968	340	—
1975	278	−2.84%
1982	261	−0.90%
1990	261	+0.00%
1999	284	+0.94%
2007	295	+0.48%
2012	326	+2.02%
2017	332	+0.37%
2023	351	+0.93%
Source: INSEE

== See also ==
- Communes of the Eure department
