= Saint-Mards-de-Fresne =

- Commune
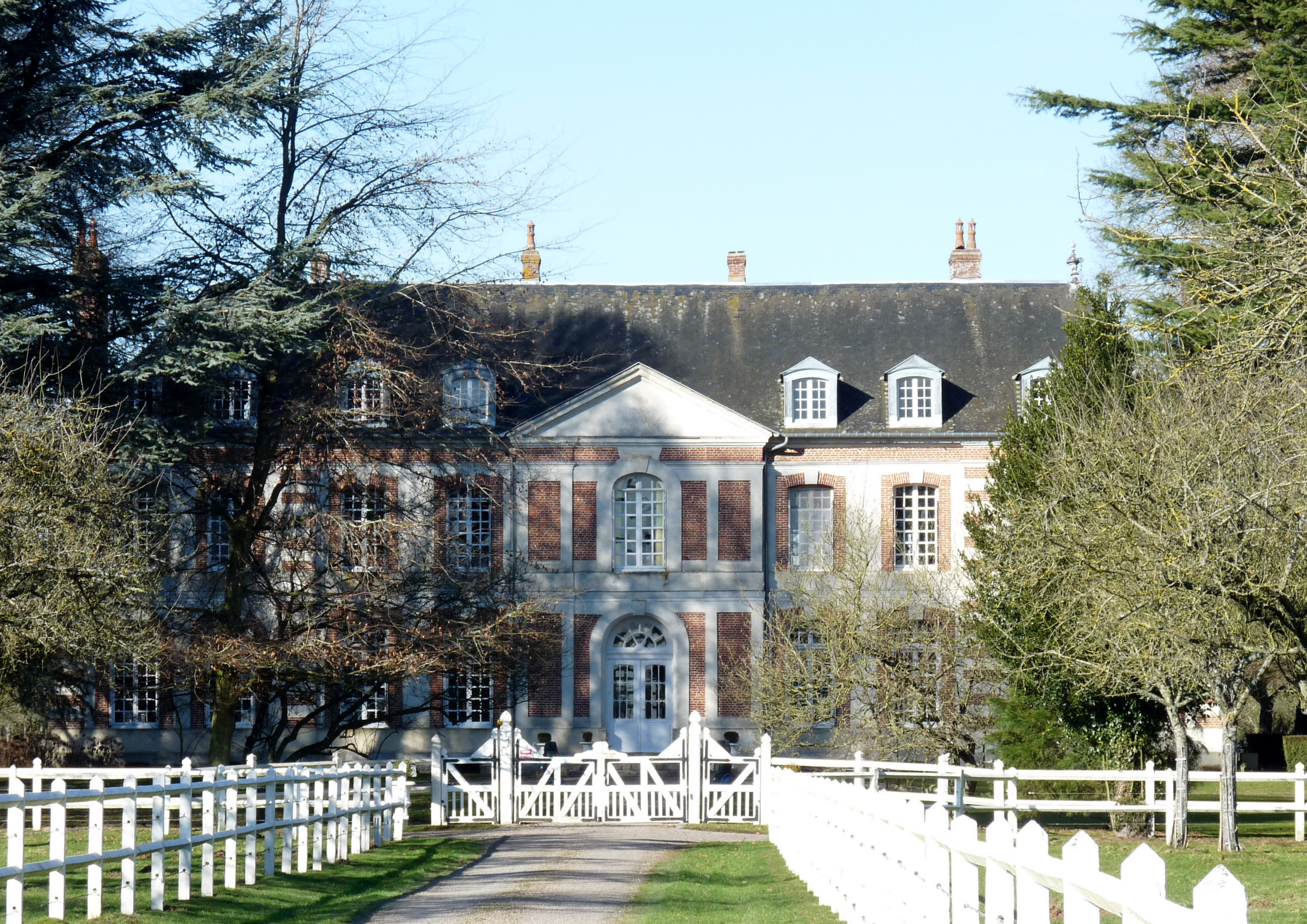
- The chateau in Saint-Mards-de-Fresne
- Location of Saint-Mards-de-Fresne
- Location within France Location within Normandy
- Coordinates: 49°04′26″N 0°27′52″E
- Country: France
- Region: Normandy
- Department: Eure
- Arrondissement: Bernay
- Canton: Beuzeville

Government
  - Mayor (2020–2026): Claude Thillaye
- Area^{1}: 13.49 km^{2} (5.21 sq mi)
- Elevation: 189 m (620 ft)
- Highest elevation: 194 m (636 ft)
- Lowest elevation: 162 m (531 ft)
- Population (2023): 347
  - Density: 25.7/km^{2} (66.6/sq mi)
- Time zone: UTC+01:00 (CET)
  - Summer (DST): UTC+02:00 (CEST)
- INSEE/Postal code: 27564 /27230
- ^{1} French Land Register data, which excludes lakes, ponds, glaciers > 1 km^{2} (0.386 sq mi or 247 acres) and river estuaries.

Saint-Mards-de-Fresne (French pronunciation: [sɛ̃ maʁ də fʁɛn]) is a commune in the Eure department in Normandy in northern France.

== Population ==
Historical population
Year	Pop.	±% p.a.
1968	301	—
1975	325	+1.10%
1982	349	+1.02%
1990	328	−0.77%
1999	317	−0.38%
2007	339	+0.84%
2012	350	+0.64%
2017	334	−0.93%
2023	347	+0.64%
Source: INSEE

== See also ==
- Communes of the Eure department
