= Le Bois-Hellain =

- Commune
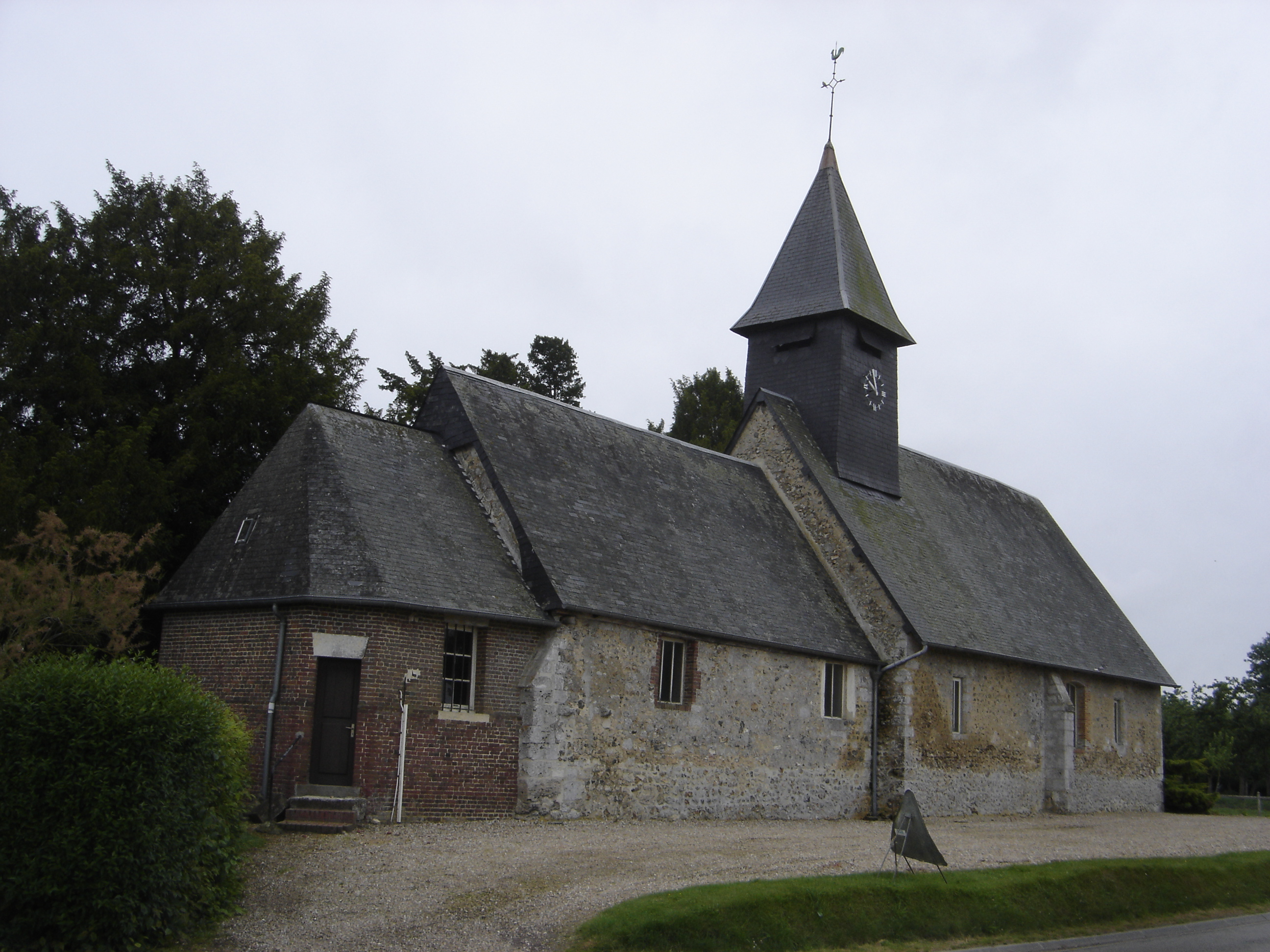
- The church in Le Bois-Hellain
- Location of Le Bois-Hellain
- Location within France Location within Normandy
- Coordinates: 49°16′47″N 0°23′25″E
- Country: France
- Region: Normandy
- Department: Eure
- Arrondissement: Bernay
- Canton: Beuzeville

Government
  - Mayor (2023–2026): Jean Pierre Elou
- Area^{1}: 3.2 km^{2} (1.2 sq mi)
- Elevation: 142 m (466 ft)
- Highest elevation: 156 m (512 ft)
- Lowest elevation: 90 m (300 ft)
- Population (2023): 219
  - Density: 68/km^{2} (180/sq mi)
- Time zone: UTC+01:00 (CET)
  - Summer (DST): UTC+02:00 (CEST)
- INSEE/Postal code: 27071 /27260
- ^{1} French Land Register data, which excludes lakes, ponds, glaciers > 1 km^{2} (0.386 sq mi or 247 acres) and river estuaries.

Le Bois-Hellain (French pronunciation: [lə bwa elɛ̃]) is a commune in the Eure department in Normandy in northern France.

== Population ==
Historical population
Year	Pop.	±% p.a.
1968	113	—
1975	111	−0.25%
1982	102	−1.20%
1990	147	+4.67%
1999	158	+0.81%
2007	220	+4.22%
2012	233	+1.15%
2017	226	−0.61%
2023	219	−0.52%
Source: INSEE

== See also ==
- Communes of the Eure department
