= Bailleul-la-Vallée =

- Commune
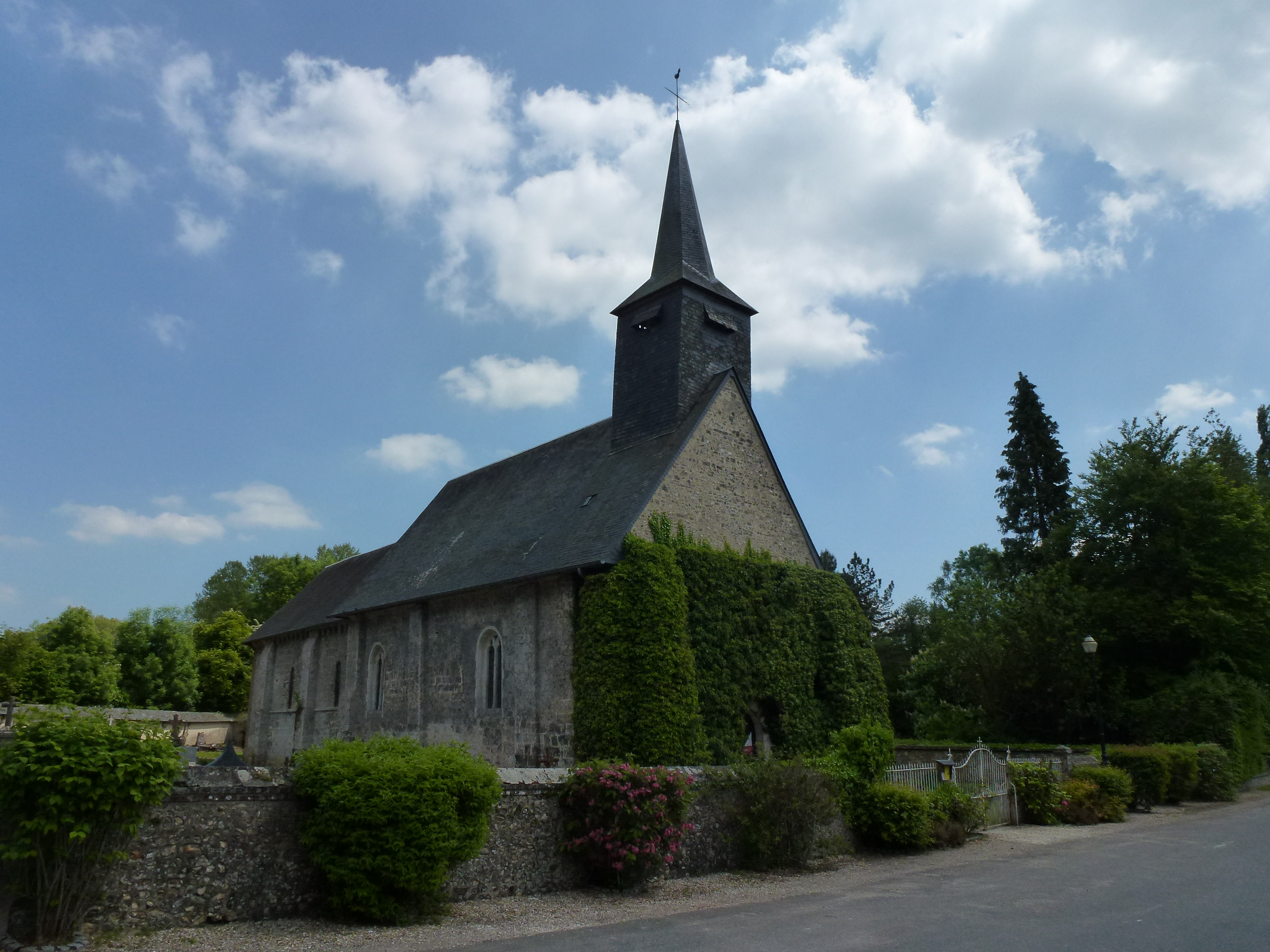
- The church in Bailleul-la-Vallée
- Location of Bailleul-la-Vallée
- Location within France Location within Normandy
- Coordinates: 49°12′03″N 0°25′43″E
- Country: France
- Region: Normandy
- Department: Eure
- Arrondissement: Bernay
- Canton: Beuzeville

Government
  - Mayor (2020–2026): Patrick Bucaille
- Area^{1}: 4.67 km^{2} (1.80 sq mi)
- Elevation: 150 m (490 ft)
- Highest elevation: 162 m (531 ft)
- Lowest elevation: 92 m (302 ft)
- Population (2023): 96
  - Density: 21/km^{2} (53/sq mi)
- Time zone: UTC+01:00 (CET)
  - Summer (DST): UTC+02:00 (CEST)
- INSEE/Postal code: 27035 /27260
- ^{1} French Land Register data, which excludes lakes, ponds, glaciers > 1 km^{2} (0.386 sq mi or 247 acres) and river estuaries.

Bailleul-la-Vallée (French pronunciation: [bajœl la vale]) is a commune in the Eure department in Normandy in northern France.

== Population ==
Historical population
Year	Pop.	±% p.a.
1968	120	—
1975	134	+1.59%
1982	145	+1.13%
1990	119	−2.44%
1999	122	+0.28%
2007	129	+0.70%
2012	122	−1.11%
2017	114	−1.35%
2023	96	−2.82%
Source: INSEE

== See also ==
- Communes of the Eure department
