= La Poterie-Mathieu =

- Commune
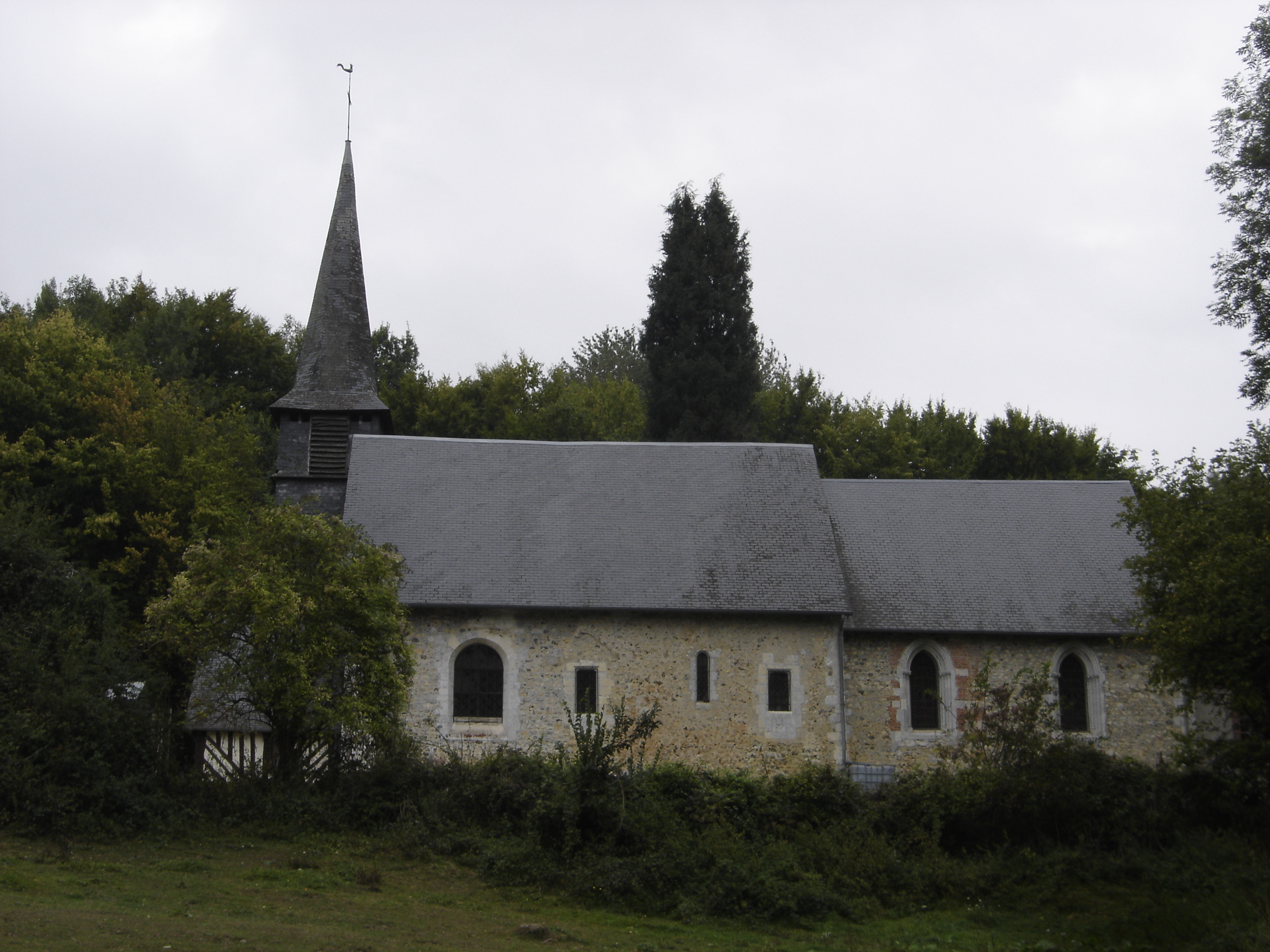
- The church in La Poterie-Mathieu

- Coat of arms
- Location of La Poterie-Mathieu
- Location within France Location within Normandy
- Coordinates: 49°15′31″N 0°31′09″E
- Country: France
- Region: Normandy
- Department: Eure
- Arrondissement: Bernay
- Canton: Beuzeville

Government
  - Mayor (2020–2026): Gilles Sébire
- Area^{1}: 6.41 km^{2} (2.47 sq mi)
- Elevation: 164 m (538 ft)
- Highest elevation: 183 m (600 ft)
- Lowest elevation: 114 m (374 ft)
- Population (2023): 168
  - Density: 26.2/km^{2} (67.9/sq mi)
- Time zone: UTC+01:00 (CET)
  - Summer (DST): UTC+02:00 (CEST)
- INSEE/Postal code: 27475 /27560
- ^{1} French Land Register data, which excludes lakes, ponds, glaciers > 1 km^{2} (0.386 sq mi or 247 acres) and river estuaries.

La Poterie-Mathieu (French pronunciation: [la pɔtʁi matjø]) is a commune in the Eure department in Normandy in northern France. The lords of the manor were the de Livet family, and later their descendants the de Livet de Barville family, Marquis of Barville.

== Geography ==
The commune along with another 69 communes shares part of a 4,747 hectare, Natura 2000 conservation area, called Risle, Guiel, Charentonne.

== Population ==
Historical population
| Year | Pop. | ±% p.a. |
|---|---|---|
| 1968 | 124 | — |
| 1975 | 150 | +2.76% |
| 1982 | 149 | −0.10% |
| 1990 | 126 | −2.07% |
| 1999 | 132 | +0.52% |
| 2007 | 138 | +0.56% |
| 2012 | 164 | +3.51% |
| 2017 | 169 | +0.60% |
| 2023 | 168 | −0.10% |
Source: INSEE

== See also ==
- Communes of the Eure department
