= Le Planquay =

- Commune
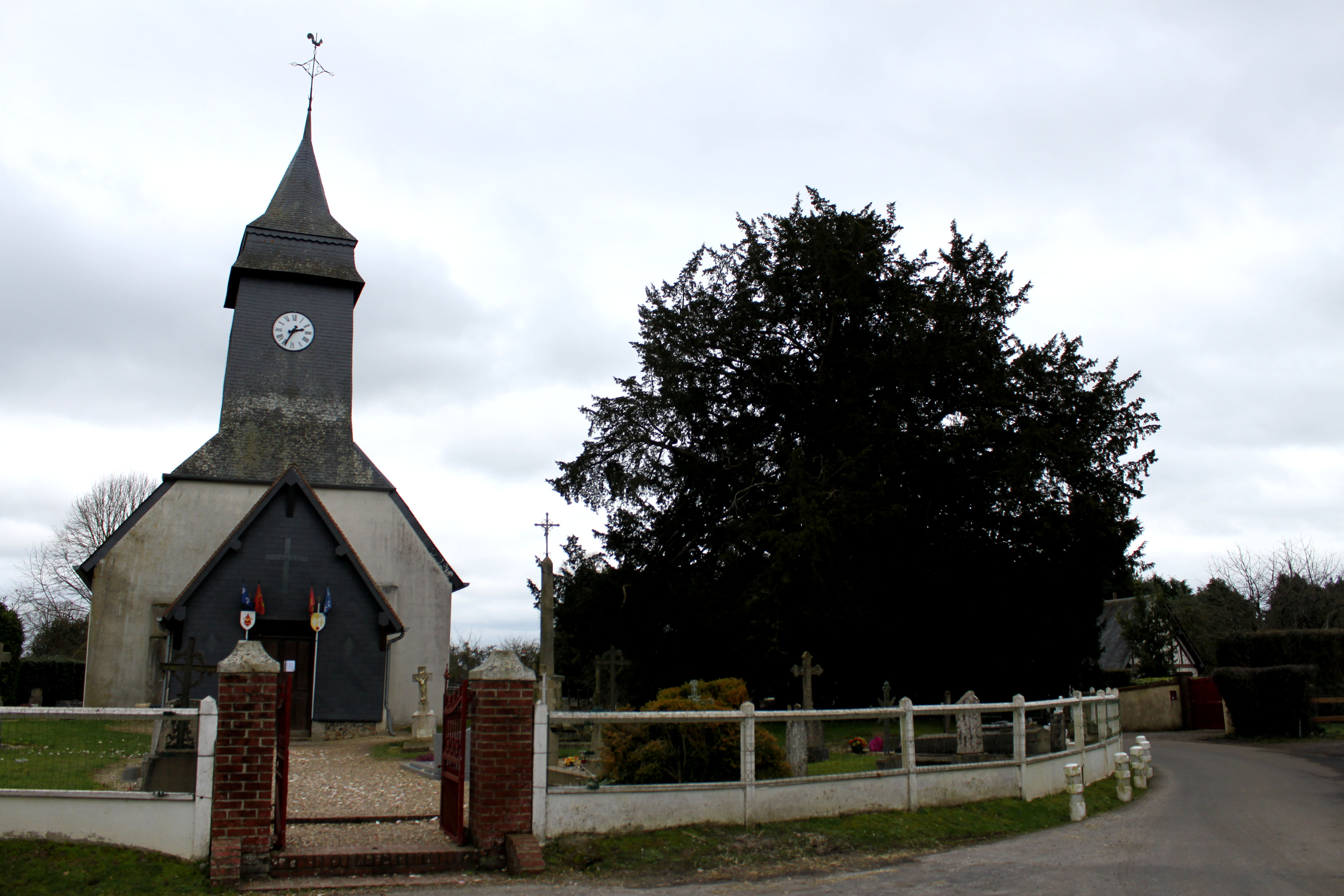
- The church in Le Planquay
- Location of Le Planquay
- Location within France Location within Normandy
- Coordinates: 49°05′50″N 0°25′54″E
- Country: France
- Region: Normandy
- Department: Eure
- Arrondissement: Bernay
- Canton: Beuzeville

Government
  - Mayor (2020–2026): Micheline Paris
- Area^{1}: 4.04 km^{2} (1.56 sq mi)
- Elevation: 200 m (660 ft)
- Highest elevation: 201 m (659 ft)
- Lowest elevation: 178 m (584 ft)
- Population (2023): 158
  - Density: 39.1/km^{2} (101/sq mi)
- Time zone: UTC+01:00 (CET)
  - Summer (DST): UTC+02:00 (CEST)
- INSEE/Postal code: 27462 /27230
- ^{1} French Land Register data, which excludes lakes, ponds, glaciers > 1 km^{2} (0.386 sq mi or 247 acres) and river estuaries.

Le Planquay (French pronunciation: [lə plɑ̃kɛ]) is a commune in the Eure department in Normandy in northern France.

== Population ==
Historical population
Year	Pop.	±% p.a.
1968	135	—
1975	117	−2.02%
1982	141	+2.70%
1990	140	−0.09%
1999	123	−1.43%
2007	144	+1.99%
2012	156	+1.61%
2017	157	+0.13%
2023	158	+0.11%
Source: INSEE

== See also ==
- Communes of the Eure department
