= Barville, Eure =

Barville
- Commune
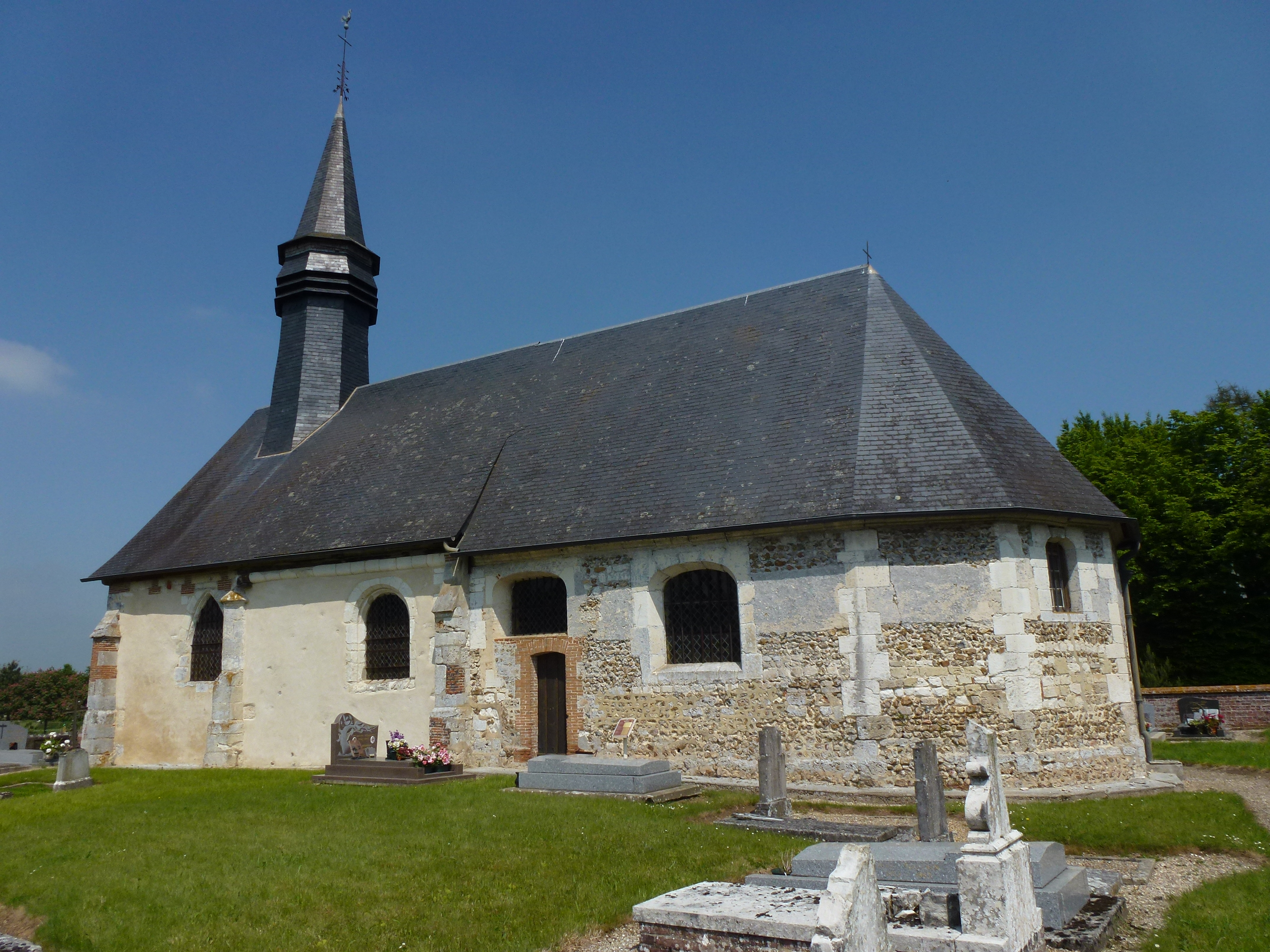
- The church in Barville

- Coat of arms
- Location of Barville
- Location within France Location within Normandy
- Coordinates: 49°09′29″N 0°28′44″E
- Country: France
- Region: Normandy
- Department: Eure
- Arrondissement: Bernay
- Canton: Beuzeville

Government
  - Mayor (2020–2026): Jean-Luc Hie
- Area^{1}: 2.71 km^{2} (1.05 sq mi)
- Elevation: 160 m (520 ft)
- Highest elevation: 179 m (587 ft)
- Lowest elevation: 148 m (486 ft)
- Population (2023): 86
  - Density: 32/km^{2} (82/sq mi)
- Time zone: UTC+01:00 (CET)
  - Summer (DST): UTC+02:00 (CEST)
- INSEE/Postal code: 27042 /27230
- ^{1} French Land Register data, which excludes lakes, ponds, glaciers > 1 km^{2} (0.386 sq mi or 247 acres) and river estuaries.

Barville (French pronunciation: [baʁvil]) is a commune in the Eure department in northern France.

== Population ==
Historical population
Year	Pop.	±% p.a.
1968	52	—
1975	47	−1.43%
1982	50	+0.89%
1990	59	+2.09%
1999	61	+0.37%
2007	74	+2.44%
2012	65	−2.56%
2017	71	+1.78%
2023	86	+3.25%
Source: INSEE

== See also ==
- Communes of the Eure department
