= Martinsburg, Ripley County, Missouri =

Extinct town in Ripley County, Missouri

Coordinates: 36.587836°N 90.690673°W

Martinsburg is an extinct town in Ripley County, in the U.S. state of Missouri.

A post office called Martinsburgh was established in 1842, and remained in operation until 1867. The community was named after John F. Martin, a local merchant.
