= Heudreville-en-Lieuvin =

- Commune
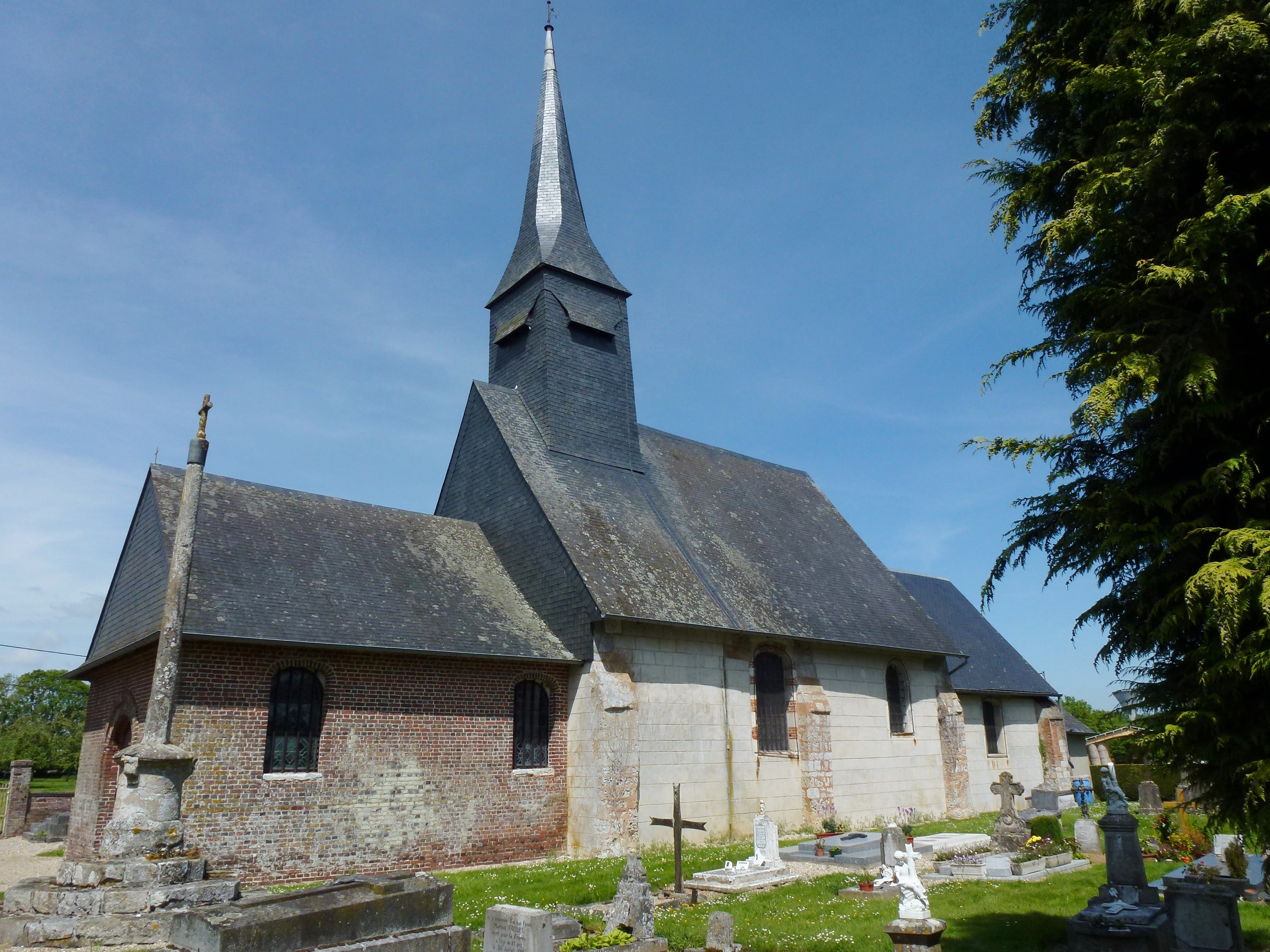
- The church of Saint-Pierre in Heudreville-en-Lieuvin
- Location of Heudreville-en-Lieuvin
- Location within France Location within Normandy
- Coordinates: 49°11′48″N 0°30′18″E
- Country: France
- Region: Normandy
- Department: Eure
- Arrondissement: Bernay
- Canton: Beuzeville

Government
  - Mayor (2020–2026): Jean-Pierre Fauville
- Area^{1}: 4.15 km^{2} (1.60 sq mi)
- Elevation: 170 m (560 ft)
- Highest elevation: 173 m (568 ft)
- Lowest elevation: 150 m (490 ft)
- Population (2023): 117
  - Density: 28.2/km^{2} (73.0/sq mi)
- Time zone: UTC+01:00 (CET)
  - Summer (DST): UTC+02:00 (CEST)
- INSEE/Postal code: 27334 /27230
- ^{1} French Land Register data, which excludes lakes, ponds, glaciers > 1 km^{2} (0.386 sq mi or 247 acres) and river estuaries.

Heudreville-en-Lieuvin (French pronunciation: [ødʁəvil ɑ̃ ljøvɛ̃]) is a commune in the Eure department in northern France.

== Population ==
Historical population
Year	Pop.	±% p.a.
1968	154	—
1975	122	−3.27%
1982	117	−0.60%
1990	108	−1.00%
1999	106	−0.21%
2007	104	−0.24%
2012	102	−0.39%
2017	108	+1.15%
2023	117	+1.34%
Source: INSEE

== See also ==
- Communes of the Eure department
