= Martainville, Eure =

Martainville
- Commune
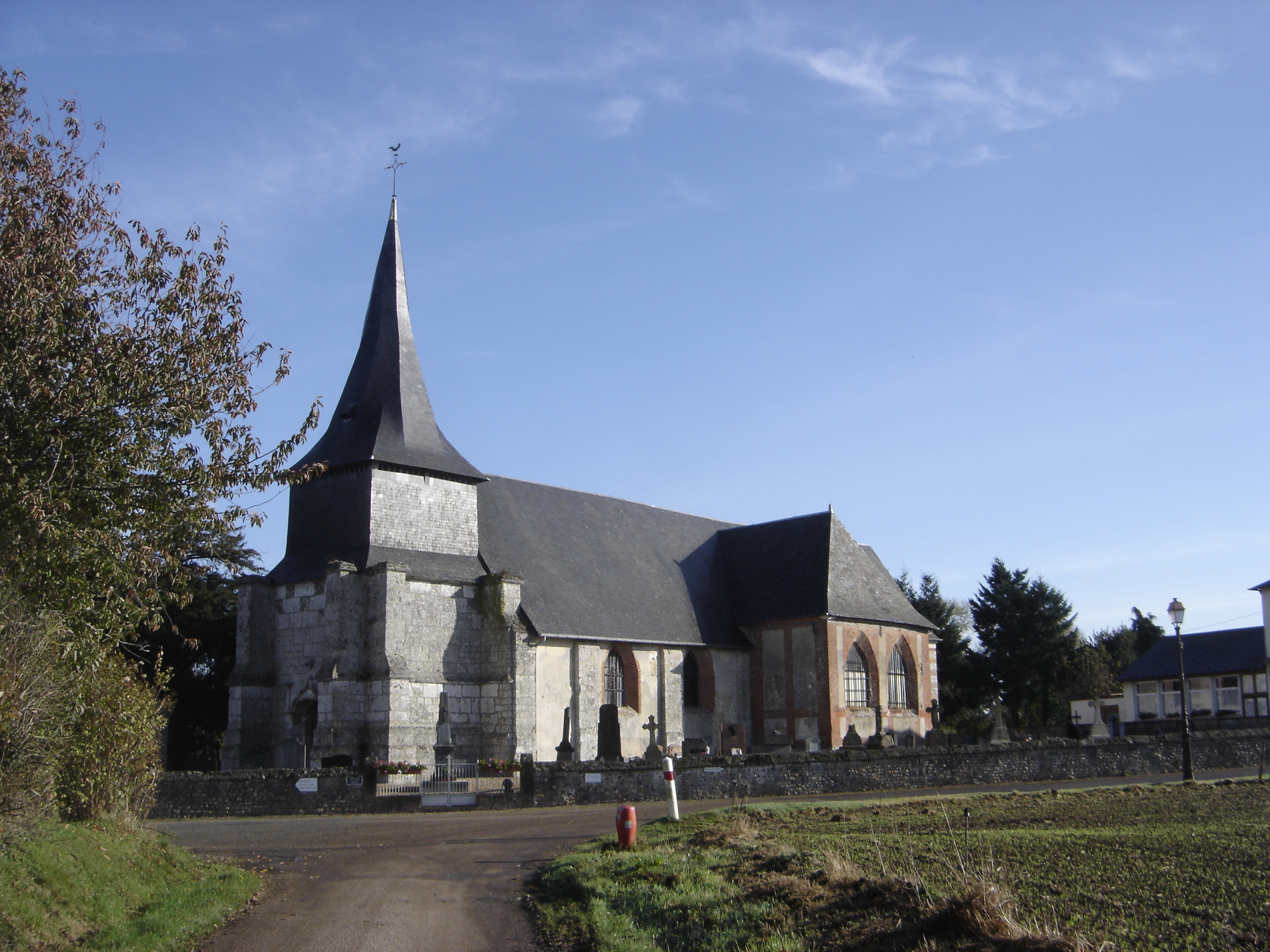
- The church in Martainville

- Coat of arms
- Location of Martainville
- Location within France Location within Normandy
- Coordinates: 49°18′27″N 0°24′26″E
- Country: France
- Region: Normandy
- Department: Eure
- Arrondissement: Bernay
- Canton: Beuzeville

Government
  - Mayor (2020–2026): Didier Delabrière
- Area^{1}: 9.09 km^{2} (3.51 sq mi)
- Elevation: 137 m (449 ft)
- Highest elevation: 147 m (482 ft)
- Lowest elevation: 73 m (240 ft)
- Population (2023): 498
  - Density: 54.8/km^{2} (142/sq mi)
- Time zone: UTC+01:00 (CET)
  - Summer (DST): UTC+02:00 (CEST)
- INSEE/Postal code: 27393 /27210
- ^{1} French Land Register data, which excludes lakes, ponds, glaciers > 1 km^{2} (0.386 sq mi or 247 acres) and river estuaries.

Martainville is a commune in the Eure department in Normandy in northern France.

== Population ==
Historical population
Year	Pop.	±% p.a.
1968	211	—
1975	204	−0.48%
1982	179	−1.85%
1990	195	+1.08%
1999	216	+1.14%
2007	276	+3.11%
2012	407	+8.08%
2017	493	+3.91%
2023	498	+0.17%
Source: INSEE

== See also ==
- Communes of the Eure department
