= Martinsville High School =

Martinsville High School is the name of at least two high schools in the United States of America:

- Martinsville High School (Illinois)
- Martinsville High School (Indiana)
- Martinsville High School (Virginia)
