= Le Favril, Eure =

Le Favril
- Commune
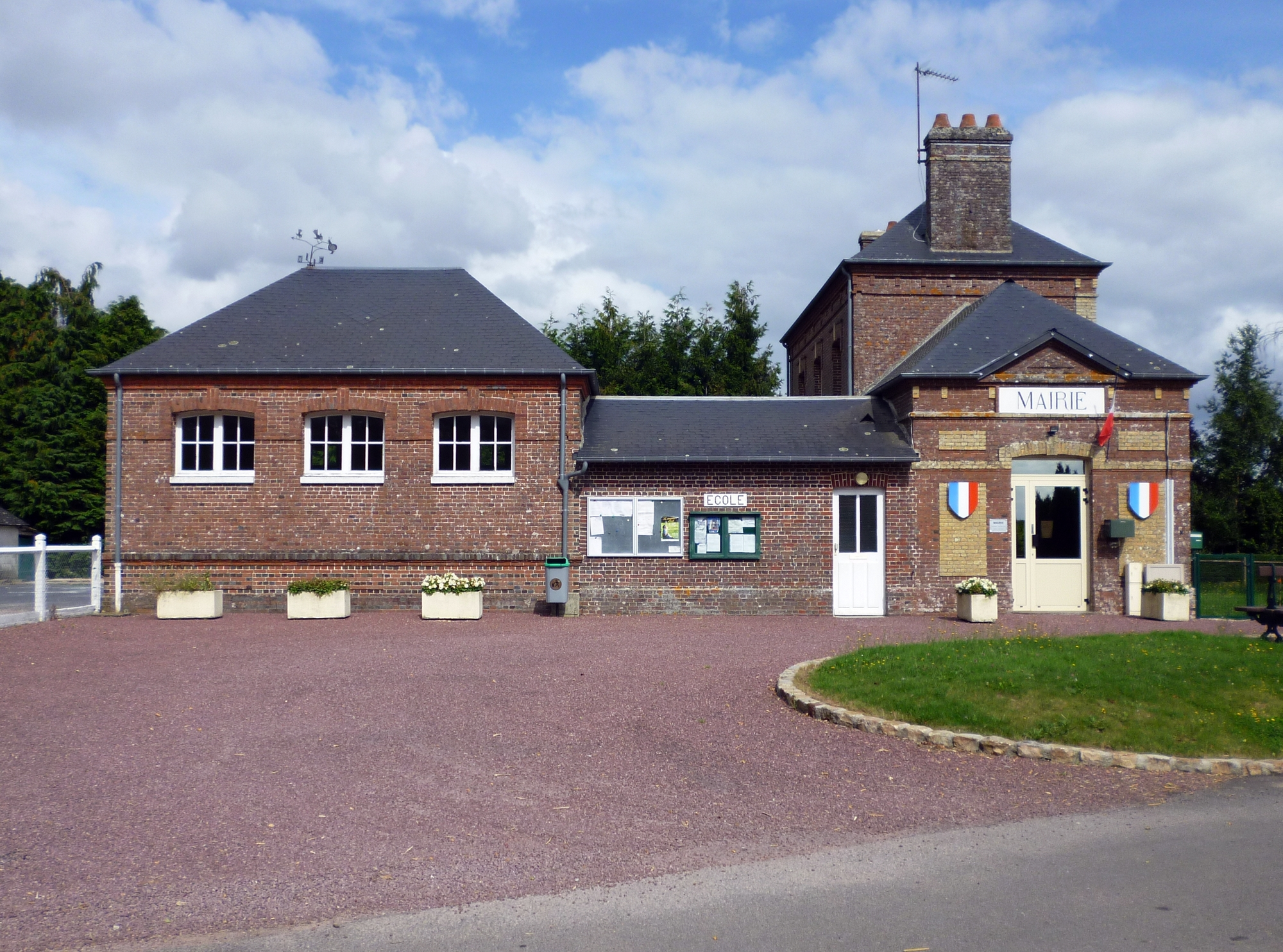
- Town hall and school
- Location of Le Favril
- Location within France Location within Normandy
- Coordinates: 49°11′01″N 0°31′57″E
- Country: France
- Region: Normandy
- Department: Eure
- Arrondissement: Bernay
- Canton: Beuzeville

Government
  - Mayor (2020–2026): Christian Verkinder
- Area^{1}: 4.03 km^{2} (1.56 sq mi)
- Elevation: 175 m (574 ft)
- Highest elevation: 176 m (577 ft)
- Lowest elevation: 167 m (548 ft)
- Population (2023): 185
  - Density: 45.9/km^{2} (119/sq mi)
- Time zone: UTC+01:00 (CET)
  - Summer (DST): UTC+02:00 (CEST)
- INSEE/Postal code: 27237 /27230
- ^{1} French Land Register data, which excludes lakes, ponds, glaciers > 1 km^{2} (0.386 sq mi or 247 acres) and river estuaries.

Le Favril (French pronunciation: [lə favʁil]) is a commune in the Eure department in the Normandy region in northern France.

== Population ==
Historical population
Year	Pop.	±% p.a.
1968	191	—
1975	153	−3.12%
1982	146	−0.67%
1990	141	−0.43%
1999	145	+0.31%
2007	163	+1.47%
2012	177	+1.66%
2017	170	−0.80%
2023	185	+1.42%
Source: INSEE

== See also ==
- Communes of the Eure department
