= Sankt Johann =

Sankt Johann (German pronunciation: [zaŋkt ˈjoːhan], "Saint John") may refer to the following places:

== Germany ==
- St. Johann (Reutlingen), a municipality in the district of Reutlingen, Baden-Württemberg
- Sankt Johann, Mainz-Bingen, a municipality in the district Mainz-Bingen, Rhineland-Palatinate
- Sankt Johann, Mayen-Koblenz, a municipality in the district Mayen-Koblenz, Rhineland-Palatinate
- Sankt Johann (Saarbrücken), a borough of Saarbrücken, Saarland

== Austria ==
- Sankt Johann im Pongau, in the state of Salzburg
- in Styria:
  - Sankt Johann am Tauern
  - Sankt Johann bei Herberstein
  - Sankt Johann im Saggautal
  - Sankt Johann in der Haide
  - Sankt Johann-Köppling
- Sankt Johann in Tirol, in Tyrol
- Sankt Johann im Walde, in Tyrol
- Sankt Johann am Walde, in Upper Austria
- Sankt Johann am Wimberg, in Upper Austria

== Switzerland ==
- Alt St. Johann, in the Canton of St. Gallen
- St. Johann, Schaffhausen, in the city of Schaffhausen

== See also ==
- San Giovanni (disambiguation)
- Saint-Jean (disambiguation)
- Saint John (disambiguation)
- Saint Juan (disambiguation)
- Sant Joan (disambiguation)
- San Juan (disambiguation)
- São João (disambiguation)
