= Giovanni =

Giovanni or Giovani may refer to:

- Giovanni (name), an Italian male given name and surname
- Giovanni (meteorology), a Web interface for users to analyze NASA's gridded data
- Don Giovanni, a 1787 opera by Wolfgang Amadeus Mozart, based on the legend of Don Juan
- Giovanni (Pokémon), boss of Team Rocket in the fictional world of Pokémon
- Giovanni (World of Darkness), a group of vampires in Vampire: The Masquerade/World of Darkness roleplay and video game
- "Giovanni", a song by Band-Maid from the 2021 album Unseen World
- Giovanni's Island, a 2014 Japanese anime drama film
- Giovanni's Room, a 1956 novel by James Baldwin
- Giovani (album), by Irama, 2018

== See also ==
- Geovani
- Giovanni Battista
- San Giovanni (disambiguation)
- San Giovanni Battista (disambiguation)
