= San Giovanni =

San Giovanni, the Italian form of Saint John, is a name that may refer to dozens of saints. It may also refer to several places (most of them in Italy) and religious buildings:

== Places ==
=== Albania ===
- Shëngjin, a coastal town formerly known as San Giovanni de Medua

=== France ===
- San-Giovanni-di-Moriani, a municipality of the Haute-Corse department, Corsica

=== Italy ===
Municipalities

- Borgo San Giovanni, in the Province of Lodi, Lombardy
- Castel San Giovanni, in the Province of Piacenza, Emilia-Romagna
- Fornovo San Giovanni, in the Province of Bergamo, Lombardy
- Luserna San Giovanni, in the Province of Turin, Piedmont
- Monte San Giovanni Campano, in the Province of Frosinone, Lazio
- Monte San Giovanni in Sabina, in the Province of Rieti, Lazio
- Motta San Giovanni, in the Province of Reggio Calabria, Calabria
- Penna San Giovanni, in the Province of Macerata, Marche
- Rocca San Giovanni, in the Province of Chieti, Abruzzo
- Sale San Giovanni, in the Province of Cuneo, Piedmont
- San Giovanni a Piro, in the Province of Salerno, Campania
- San Giovanni al Natisone, in the Province of Udine, Friuli-Venezia Giulia
- San Giovanni Bianco, in the Province of Bergamo, Lombardy
- San Giovanni del Dosso, in the Province of Mantua, Lombardy
- San Giovanni di Gerace, in the Province of Reggio Calabria, Calabria
- San Giovanni Gemini, in the Province of Agrigento, Sicily
- San Giovanni Ilarione, in the Province of Verona, Veneto
- San Giovanni Incarico, in the Province of Frosinone, Lazio
- San Giovanni in Croce, in the Province of Cremona, Lombardy
- San Giovanni in Fiore, in the Province of Cosenza, Calabria
- San Giovanni in Galdo, in the Province of Campobasso, Molise
- San Giovanni in Marignano, in the Province of Rimini, Emilia-Romagna
- San Giovanni in Persiceto, in the Province of Bologna, Emilia-Romagna
- San Giovanni la Punta, in the Province of Catania, Sicily
- San Giovanni Lipioni, in the Province of Chieti, Abruzzo
- San Giovanni Lupatoto, in the Province of Verona, Veneto
- San Giovanni Rotondo, in the Province of Foggia, Apulia
- San Giovanni Suergiu, in the Province of Carbonia-Iglesias, Sardinia
- San Giovanni Teatino, in the Province of Chieti, Abruzzo
- San Giovanni Valdarno, in the Province of Arezzo, Tuscany
- Sesto San Giovanni, in the Province of Milan, Lombardy
- Villa San Giovanni, in the Province of Reggio Calabria, Calabria
- Villa San Giovanni in Tuscia, in the Province of Viterbo, Lazio

Hamlets and quarters

- San Giovanni, in the municipality of Bellagio (CO), Lombardy
- San Giovanni, in the municipality of Castellamonte (TO), Piedmont
- San Giovanni, in the municipality of Motta di Livenza (TV), Veneto
- San Giovanni, in the municipality of Portoferraio (LI), Tuscany
- San Giovanni, in the municipality of Sassari, Sardinia
- San Giovanni, in the municipality Solagna (VI), Veneto
- San Giovanni Apostolo, a quarter of the city of Palermo
- San Giovanni a Cerreto, in the municipality of Castelnuovo Berardenga (SI), Tuscany
- San Giovanni a Teduccio, a quarter of the city of Naples
- San Giovanni Cilento, in the municipality of Stella Cilento (SA), Campania
- San Giovanni d'Asso, in the municipality of Montalcino (SI), Tuscany
- San Giovanni di Duino, in the municipality of Duino-Aurisina (TS), Friuli-Venezia Giulia
- San Giovanni di Sinis, in the municipality of Cabras (OR), Sardinia
- San Giovanni di Val d'Era, in the municipality of Lajatico (PI), Tuscany
- San Giovanni Montebello, in the municipality of Giarre (CT), Sicily

=== Malta ===
- San Ġwann (it: San Giovanni), a town and local council

=== Montenegro ===
- Sveti Ivan (it: San Giovanni), a fortress atop a hill above the town of Kotor.

=== San Marino ===
- San Giovanni sotto le Penne, a village (curazia) of the municipality of Borgo Maggiore

== Churches ==
Many hundreds, probably even thousands, of churches are also named after the various saints hiding under the simple "Giovanni", among them:

- the Basilica di San Giovanni in Laterano in Rome
- the Baptistry of Battistero di San Giovanni (Florence)
- San Giovanni (Siena)
- San Giovanni de Butris in Umbria
- San Giovanni di Dio in Florence
- San Giovanni in Tuba in Friuli-Venezia Giulia
- Church of San Giovanni Battista (disambiguation)

== Other ==
- Italian corvette San Giovanni, a steam corvette of the Italian Royal Navy
- San Giovanni (Rome Metro), an underground station in Rome
- Sangiovanni, an Italian singer
- HMS Athenienne, British ship formerly known as San Giovanni

== See also ==
- San (disambiguation)
- Giovanni (disambiguation)
- San Giovanni Battista (disambiguation)
- Saint-Jean (disambiguation)
- Saint John (disambiguation)
- Saint Juan (disambiguation)
- Sant Joan (disambiguation)
- San Juan (disambiguation)
- São João (disambiguation)
- St. Johann (disambiguation)
