= Saint-Jean =

Saint-Jean (French for Saint John) may refer to:

== Places ==
=== Belgium ===
- Sint-Jan, a borough of Ypres, sometimes referenced as Saint-Jean in a World War I-related context

=== Canada ===
- Lac Saint-Jean
- Lac-Saint-Jean-Est Regional County Municipality
- L'Anse-Saint-Jean, Quebec
- Rivière-Saint-Jean, Gaspésie, Quebec, unorganized territory
- Rivière-Saint-Jean, Quebec, municipality in Côte-Nord region
- Saint-André-du-Lac-Saint-Jean, Quebec
- Saint-Jean (federal electoral district) in Quebec
- Saint-Jean (provincial electoral district) in Quebec
- Saint-Jean-Baptiste, Quebec
- Saint-Jean-Chrysostome, former municipality now part of Lévis, Quebec
- Saint-Jean-Chrysostome, community in Saint-Chrysostome, Quebec
- Saint-Jean-de-Brébeuf, Quebec
- Saint-Jean-de-Cherbourg, Quebec
- Saint-Jean-de-Dieu, Quebec
- Saint-Jean-de-la-Lande, Quebec
- Saint-Jean-de-l'Île-d'Orléans
- Saint-Jean-de-Matha, Quebec
- Saint-Jean-des-Piles, former municipality now part of Shawinigan, Quebec
- Saint-Jean-Port-Joli, Quebec
- Saint-Jean-sur-le-Lac, a community part of Mont-Laurier, Quebec
- Saint-Jean-sur-Richelieu (formerly St. Johns and Fort St-Jean)

=== Channel Islands ===
- Saint John, Jersey

=== France ===
- Saint-Jean-aux-Amognes, in the Nièvre department
- Saint-Jean-aux-Bois, Ardennes, in the Ardennes department
- Saint-Jean-aux-Bois, Oise, in the Oise department
- Saint-Jean-Bonnefonds, in the Loire department
- Saint-Jean-Brévelay, in the Morbihan department
- Saint-Jean-Cap-Ferrat, in the Alpes-Maritimes department
- Saint-Jean-Chambre, in the Ardèche department
- Saint-Jean-d'Aigues-Vives, in the Ariège department
- Saint-Jean-d'Alcapiès, in the Aveyron department
- Saint-Jean-d'Angély, in the Charente-Maritime department
- Saint-Jean-d'Angle, in the Charente-Maritime department
- Saint-Jean-d'Ardières, in the Rhône department
- Saint-Jean-d'Arves, in the Savoie department
- Saint-Jean-d'Arvey, in the Savoie department
- Saint-Jean-d'Assé, in the Sarthe department
- Saint-Jean-d'Ataux, in the Dordogne department
- Saint-Jean-d'Aubrigoux, in the Haute-Loire department
- Saint-Jean-d'Aulps, in the Haute-Savoie department
- Saint-Jean-d'Avelanne, in the Isère department
- Saint-Jean-de-Barrou, in the Aude department
- Saint-Jean-de-Bassel, in the Moselle department
- Saint-Jean-de-Beauregard, in the Essonne department
- Saint-Jean-de-Belleville, in the Savoie department
- Saint-Jean-de-Beugné, in the Vendée department
- Saint-Jean-de-Blaignac, in the Gironde department
- Saint-Jean-de-Bœuf, in the Côte-d'Or department
- Saint-Jean-de-Boiseau, in the Loire-Atlantique department
- Saint-Jean-de-Bonneval, in the Aube department
- Saint-Jean-de-Bournay, in the Isère department
- Saint-Jean-de-Braye, in the Loiret department
- Saint-Jean-de-Buèges, in the Hérault department
- Saint-Jean-de-Ceyrargues, in the Gard department
- Saint-Jean-de-Chevelu, in the Savoie department
- Saint-Jean-de-Côle, in the Dordogne department
- Saint-Jean-de-Cornies, in the Hérault department
- Saint-Jean-de-Couz, in the Savoie department
- Saint-Jean-de-Crieulon, in the Gard department
- Saint-Jean-de-Cuculles, in the Hérault department
- Saint-Jean-de-Daye, in the Manche department
- Saint-Jean-de-Duras, in the Lot-et-Garonne department
- Saint-Jean-de-Folleville, in the Seine-Maritime department
- Saint-Jean-de-Fos, in the Hérault department
- Saint-Jean-de-Gonville, in the Ain department
- Saint-Jean-de-la-Blaquière, in the Hérault department
- Saint-Jean-de-la-Croix, in the Maine-et-Loire department
- Saint-Jean-de-la-Forêt, in the Orne department
- Saint-Jean-de-la-Haize, in the Manche department
- Saint-Jean-de-la-Léqueraye, in the Eure department
- Saint-Jean-de-la-Motte, in the Sarthe department
- Saint-Jean-de-la-Neuville, in the Seine-Maritime department
- Saint-Jean-de-la-Porte, in the Savoie department
- Saint-Jean-de-la-Rivière, in the Manche department
- Saint-Jean-de-la-Ruelle, in the Loiret department
- Saint-Jean-de-Laur, in the Lot department
- Saint-Jean-de-Lier, in the Landes department
- Saint-Jean-de-Linières, in the Maine-et-Loire department
- Saint-Jean-de-Liversay, in the Charente-Maritime department
- Saint-Jean-de-Livet, in the Calvados department
- Saint-Jean-Delnous, in the Aveyron department
- Saint-Jean-de-Losne, in the Côte-d'Or department
- Saint-Jean-de-Luz, in the Pyrénées-Atlantiques department
- Saint-Jean-de-Marcel, in the Tarn department
- Saint-Jean-de-Marsacq, in the Landes department
- Saint-Jean-de-Maruéjols-et-Avéjan, in the Gard department
- Saint-Jean-de-Maurienne, in the Savoie department
- Saint-Jean-de-Minervois, in the Hérault department
- Saint-Jean-de-Moirans, in the Isère department
- Saint-Jean-de-Monts, in the Vendée department
- Saint-Jean-de-Muzols, in the Ardèche department
- Saint-Jean-de-Nay, in the Haute-Loire department
- Saint-Jean-de-Niost, in the Ain department
- Saint-Jean-de-Paracol, in the Aude department
- Saint-Jean-de-Rebervilliers, in the Eure-et-Loir department
- Saint-Jean-de-Rives, in the Tarn department
- Saint-Jean-de-Sauves, in the Vienne department
- Saint-Jean-de-Savigny, in the Manche department
- Saint-Jean-des-Baisants, in the Manche department
- Saint-Jean-des-Bois, in the Orne department
- Saint-Jean-des-Champs, in the Manche department
- Saint-Jean-des-Échelles, in the Sarthe department
- Saint-Jean-de-Serres, in the Gard department
- Saint-Jean-des-Essartiers, in the Calvados department
- Saint-Jean-de-Sixt, in the Haute-Savoie department
- Saint-Jean-des-Mauvrets, in the Maine-et-Loire department
- Saint-Jean-des-Ollières, in the Puy-de-Dôme department
- Saint-Jean-de-Soudain, in the Isère department
- Saint-Jean-d'Estissac, in the Dordogne department
- Saint-Jean-des-Vignes, in the Rhône department
- Saint-Jean-de-Tholome, in the Haute-Savoie department
- Saint-Jean-de-Thouars, in the Deux-Sèvres department
- Saint-Jean-de-Thurac, in the Lot-et-Garonne department
- Saint-Jean-de-Thurigneux, in the Ain department
- Saint-Jean-de-Touslas, in the Rhône department
- Saint-Jean-d'Étreux, in the Jura department
- Saint-Jean-de-Trézy, in the Saône-et-Loire department
- Saint-Jean-de-Valériscle, in the Gard department
- Saint-Jean-du-Gard, in the Gard department
- Saint-Jean-en-Royans, in the Isère department
- Saint-Jean-la-Bussière, in the Rhône department
- Saint-Jean, Haute-Garonne, in the Haute-Garonne department
- Saint-Jean, Saint Barthélemy, an area of Saint Barthélemy in the Caribbean

=== Haiti ===
- Saint-Jean-du-Sud, a municipality in the Sud Department of Haiti
  - Saint-Jean, Saint-Jean-du-Sud, Haiti, the main town in the Saint-Jean-du-Sud municipality

=== Switzerland ===
- Saint-Jean, Switzerland, in the Canton of Valais

== People ==
=== Men ===
- John the Baptist (Saint Jean-Baptiste) (died c. 30)
- Jean de Lalande (died 1646)
- Jean de Brébeuf (1593-1649)
- John Eudes (Jean Eudes) (1601-1680)
- Jean-Baptiste de La Salle (1651-1719)
- Jean-Charles Cornay (1809-1837)
- John Gabriel Perboyre (Jean-Gabriel Perboyre) (1802-1840)
- John Vianney (Jean-Baptiste-Marie Vianney (1786-1859)

=== Women ===
- Joan of Arc (Jeanne d’Arc) (1412-1431)
- Joan of France, Duchess of Berry (1464-1505)
- Jeanne de Lestonnac (1556-1640)
- Jeanne Delanoue (1666-1736)

== Other uses ==
- La Saint-Jean or Saint-Jean-Baptiste Day, Quebec's National Holiday
- Cathédrale Saint-Jean-Baptiste de Lyon, a Roman Catholic cathedral in Lyon, France

== See also ==
- Saint John (disambiguation)
- Saint Juan (disambiguation)
- San Giovanni (disambiguation)
- San Juan (disambiguation)
- Sankt Johann (disambiguation)
- Sant Joan (disambiguation)
- São João (disambiguation)
