= Chazelles =

Chazelles may refer to the following places in France:

- Chazelles, Cantal, a commune in the department of Cantal
- Chazelles, Charente, a commune in the department of Charente
- Chazelles, Jura, a commune in the department of Jura
- Chazelles, Haute-Loire, a commune in the department of Haute-Loire
- Chazelles-sur-Albe, a commune in the department of Meurthe-et-Moselle
- Chazelles-sur-Lavieu, a commune in the department of Loire
- Chazelles-sur-Lyon, a commune in the department of Loire

== See also ==
- Jean Mathieu de Chazelles (1657-1710), French hydrographer
