= Geovani =

Geovani or Geovany or Geovanni or Giovane or Giovani or Giovanni, a form of the given name John, may refer to:

- Geovany Baca (born 1971), Honduran boxer
- Giovane Élber (born 1972), Brazilian footballer
- Giovane Gávio (born 1970), Brazilian volleyball player
- Geovanni (born 1980), Brazilian footballer
- Giovani Luiz Neitzke (born 1989), Brazilian footballer
- Giovani dos Santos (born 1989), Mexican footballer
- Geovani Silva (1964–2026), Brazilian footballer
- Geovany Soto (born 1983), Puerto Rican baseball player
- Geovani (footballer, born 1993), Brazilian football midfielder
- Geovani (footballer, born 2001), Brazilian football midfielder

== See also ==
- Giovanni (disambiguation)
