= Kleinsöding church =

Catholic filial and pilgrimage church, Styria, Austria

Coordinates: 47°00′05″N 15°16′36″E

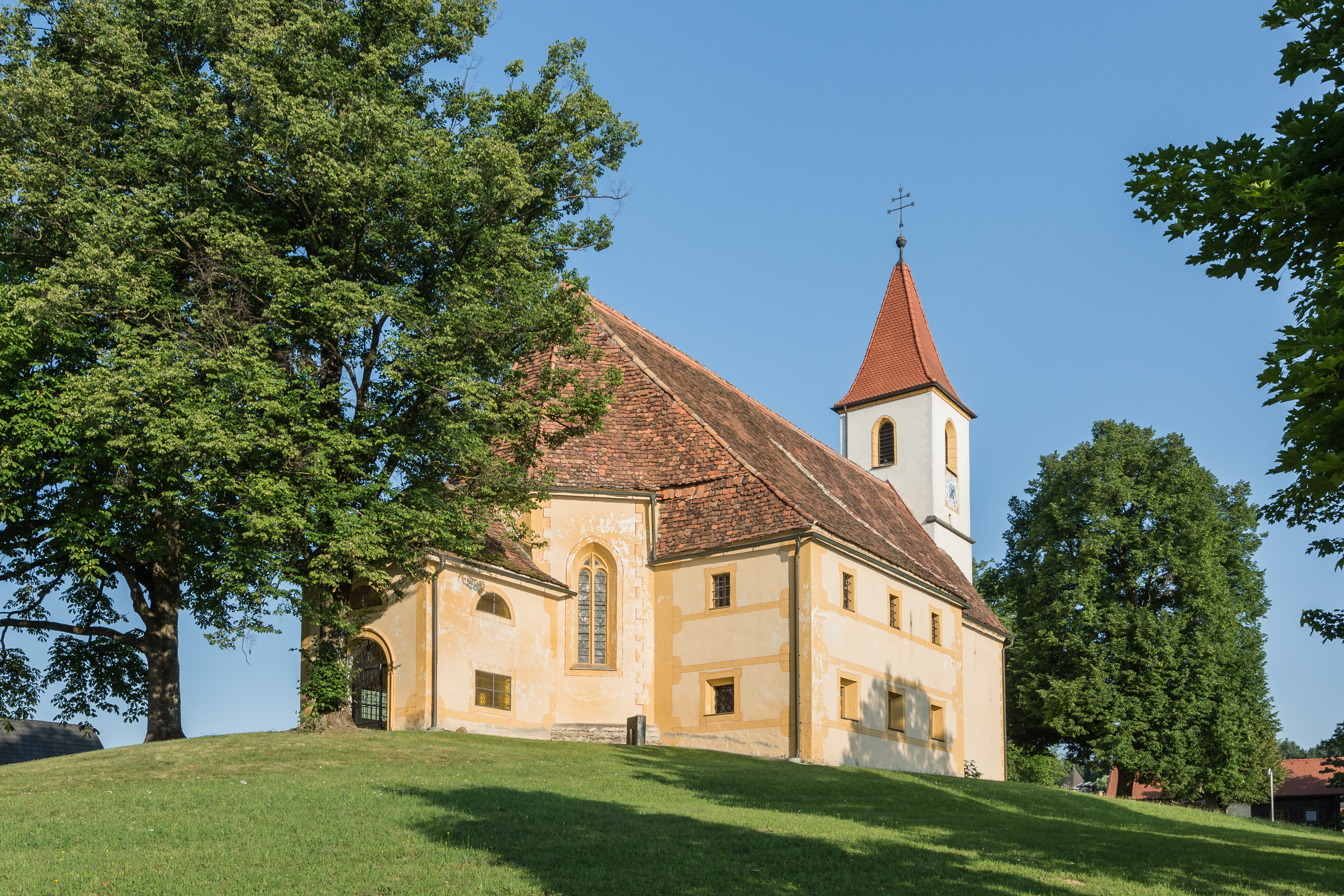
The branch church in July 2015, before the exterior walls were redesigned

The Church of Kleinsöding, often simply called Sebastianikirche, is a Roman Catholic filial and pilgrimage church in the Austrian village of Kleinsöding in western Styria, which belongs to the municipality of Söding-Sankt Johann. The church, consecrated in honor of St. Sebastian, belongs to the pastoral area of Voitsberg in the diocese of Graz-Seckau and is subordinate to the parish of Mooskirchen. As a pilgrimage church, it only plays a local role for Kleinsöding and the surrounding villages.

Its history dates back to the beginning of the 16th century, when it was built as a plague sanctuary. The origins of the church are closely linked to the outbreaks of plague in the 15th century, which almost completely depopulated parts of the surrounding area. Surviving farmers swore an oath to pay the so-called Kühzins over the course of their lives. They promised to donate the equivalent value of a cow. The money raised in this way financed the building of the church. Due to renewed plague epidemics in the 17th century, the church developed into the most important plague sanctuary in western Styria. In the second half of the 17th century, a sacristy and the Chapel of the Cross were added and the church itself was baroqueized. In the centuries that followed, however, its importance as a place of pilgrimage declined. Since the second half of the 19th century, the building has been owned by the municipality, which has also been responsible for its upkeep ever since. From the second half of the 20th century in particular, numerous maintenance and renovation works were carried out on the building structure and the church inventory.

The filial church of Kleinsöding is a late Gothic hall church that was subsequently baroqueized. The church tower rises above the nave in the north-west and the chapel of the cross, which is accessible from the outside, is attached to the end of the choir in the south-east. The high altar made of colored sandstone and the two side altars were erected around 1630. The side altars were reassembled from the wings of an older winged altar and feature carved relief panels with scenes from the life of Mary.

The entire building is a listed building.

== Location ==
The church is located in the eastern part of the municipality of Söding-Sankt Johann on a small hill, also known as the Kirchenriegel, centrally in the settlement of Sankt Sebastian around 700 meters west of the village of Kleinsöding. It is located at an altitude of around 350 meters above sea level, on the northern bank of the Kainach in the middle Kainach valley, also known as Kainachboden. Packer Straße (B 70) runs about 50 meters north of the church. About 600 meters to the west is the feeder road to the Mooskirchen exit of the southern freeway (A2). The church is located on a path branching off Packer Straße to the south-east and, like the former sacristan's house directly to the north-west, has the address Kirchenweg 1.

On the church forecourt is the war memorial of the communities of Groß- and Kleinsöding, which commemorates the fallen and missing of both world wars.

== History ==
=== Origins and construction ===
There was probably already a cult mound on the site of today's church in ancient times, and there is a legend of a pagan temple there. Later, plague victims are said to have been buried on this mound. Although local residents have reported finding bones, no archaeological evidence of a temple or plague grave has yet been found. From the 12th century at the latest, the inhabitants of the Kleinsöding area received pastoral care from the parish of Mooskirchen, which was first mentioned in documents in 1136. When the plague struck what is now the district of Voitsberg in 1348, the villages of Hardekk and Mukkaw near Muggauberg and the Reun village of Sedinge near Södingberg were completely depopulated. When the disease struck Western Styria again around 1480 and decimated the population, 135 of the surviving farmers in the area swore to donate the value of a cow during their lifetime for the construction of a church consecrated in honor of the so-called plague saint Sebastian. This donation is known as the Kühzins and the farmers donated every year until the equivalent of a cow had been paid. If the donation target was not reached during their lifetime, it was inherited and the descendants were obliged to fulfill it. The money raised in this way was enough to build a larger church near Kleinsöding.

Before the new church was built, a Romanesque hunting chapel belonging to the lords of Söding Castle is said to have stood on its later site. This had to make way for the new building. According to the clerical staff of the diocese of Seckau, the church was built in 1508, commissioned by Sebastian von Rollau. However, this assumption probably only refers to the construction of the choir, which was used as a chapel until the church was completed. This chapel already contained a sandstone statue of St. Sebastian. It is said that it was erected by monks who had been expelled from San Sebastian in Spain and had come to the Riedlhof or Riederhof near Berndorf. In the years that followed, the number of pilgrims increased steadily. The money thus raised was used to finance the construction of the nave attached to the choir with a flat wooden ceiling by 1562 and the construction of the church tower by 1564. The construction of the nave is indicated by a stone on the archway of the tower portal bearing the date and mark of the builder. The founders of the church may also have included the residents of Rollau Castle, as the church served as their burial place.

=== 16th–19th centuries ===
Plague outbreaks that struck the Kainach Valley in 1584/85 and the Voitsberg district in 1634, 1679/80 and from 1713 to 1716 resulted in more and more pilgrims making the pilgrimage to the church. In the 17th century, the pilgrimages reached their heyday and St. Sebastian's Church developed into the most important plague sanctuary in western Styria. Around 1630, the high altar of the church was erected and the statue of Sebastian, which was already in the church, was placed on it as an altarpiece. From 1665 onwards, the Keller von Kellersperg family, who lived at Groß-Söding Castle, made an appearance as benefactors of the church. In 1676, the late Gothic building was baroqueized, the previously flat-roofed nave was vaulted and a gallery was built. The sacristy and the cross chapel on the outside of the choir, which is accessible from the outside, were also created during the remodeling. In 1694, M. Simon Schoper was the only one of the Mooskirchen priests to be buried in the church under the front arch, next to the life-size figure of St. Sebastian, presumably donated by him, in accordance with his will.

From 1711 to 1880, an interest register was kept on the payment of the Kühzins, which suggests that descendants of the original benefactors were still donating to the preservation of the church. At the beginning of the 18th century, people from twelve different parishes were listed as donors. In 1799, the dean of Mooskirchen, Alois Wagl, wrote a multi-volume parish chronicle in which he also described the church's interior at the time.

Around 1800, the altarpiece of the high altar, the statue of Sebastian, was replaced by a figure of St. Anne. To protect the figures on the high altar during the Fifth Coalition War, they were enclosed in a wooden crate in 1809. The French, under the command of Marshal Auguste Frédéric Louis Viesse de Marmont, used the church as a magazine between June 25 and December 15, 1809. A regiment of Uhlans, which settled in the area from July 27 to August 14, 1813, also misused the church as a warehouse. When the parish church in Ligist was rebuilt in the middle of the 19th century, some of the church inventory there, such as the two figures at the side of the high altar, were moved to Kleinsöding. The tabernacle also came to Kleinsöding, but proved to be too large for the high altar and was therefore placed in the gallery.

In the period after the creation of the free local parish of Kleinsöding in 1850, the Sebastianikirche became the property of the parish through a settlement with the parish priest of Mooskirchen. However, the parish priest retained the right of supervision over the church and it remained under the control of the local parish. The parish kept its own church accounts with the help of the church provosts. On April 14, 1874, a lightning strike caused the roof truss of the church tower to burn and the organ was also damaged by the fire. However, the fire was quickly extinguished by the local population, so that no major damage was caused. In 1876/77, the choir and nave were repainted, with the earlier thorn and grape decorations and the sundial on the south side of the nave being whitewashed over. During a renovation in 1890, a fresco of St. Sebastian on the southern outer wall of the nave was also painted over. As part of this renovation, old windows from the Franciscan church in Graz were donated. A tower clock was installed in the 1880s.

=== 20th–21st centuries ===
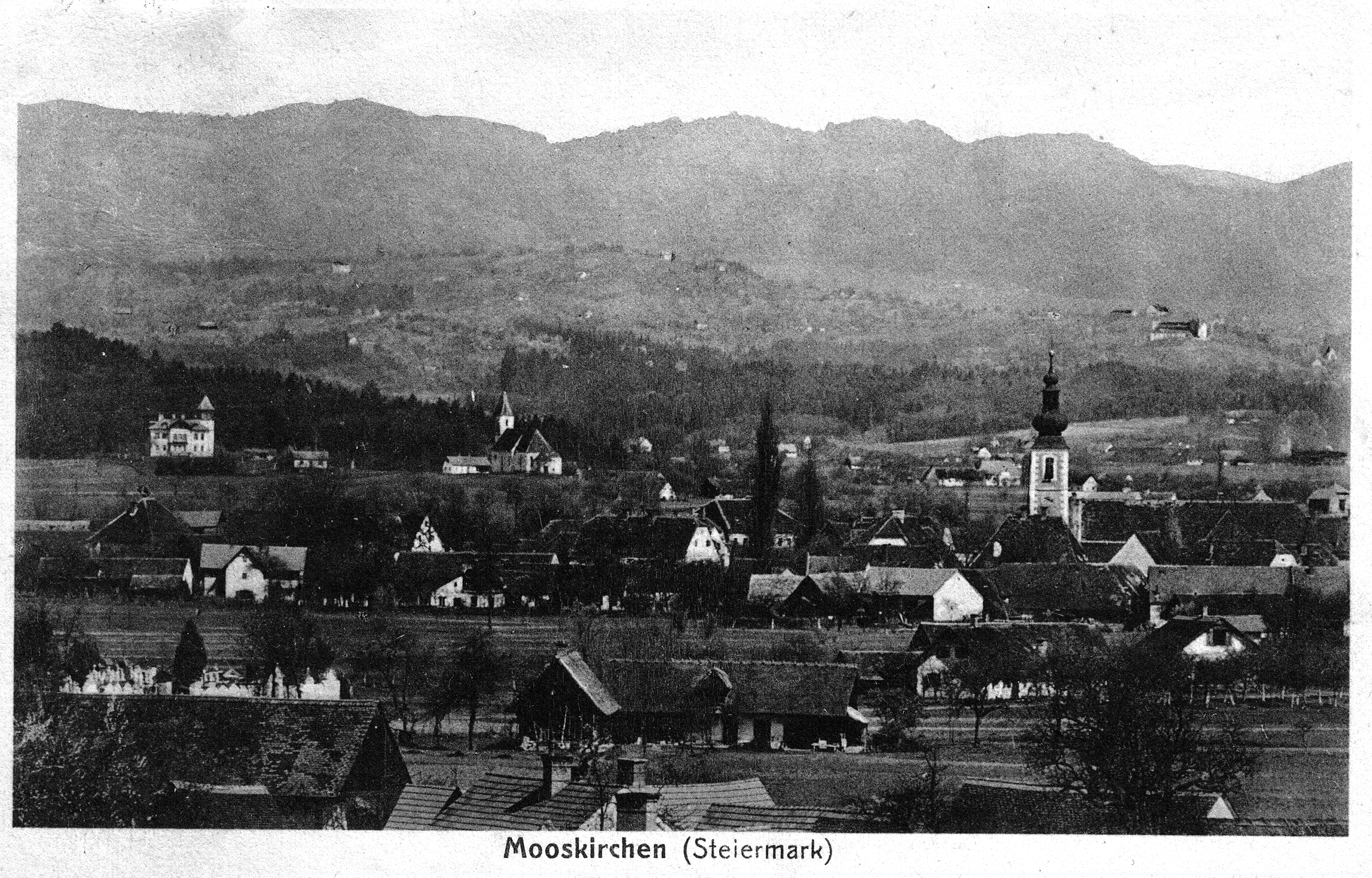
Postcard of Mooskirchen from around 1910. On the left in the background you can see the Sebastianikirche

Under chaplain Josef Radl, who worked in Mooskirchen from 1921 to 1925, the church was extensively renovated from 1924 to 1926, which he partly paid for himself. He also wrote a history of the church until 1925, which is known as the Radl Chronicle.

When the municipalities of Kleinsöding and Großsöding merged to form the municipality of Söding in 1958, the church became the property of the new municipality. Extensive repair and renovation work was carried out in the following decades. The left side altar was restored in 1961 and the right side altar in 1978, the façade was renewed in 1970/71 and the interior and parts of the furnishings were renovated from 1978 to 1983. In 1979, the inhabitants of Söding founded the St. Sebastian church community as a non-profit association for the preservation of the church. Restoration work was carried out on the high altar in 1991/92. In 1998 and 1999, further major renovation work was carried out on the building fabric and the church inventory.

Since the Styrian municipal reform in 2015, the church has belonged to the municipality of Söding-Sankt Johann. As the weather repeatedly caused damage to the roof tiles and the repair work proved to be increasingly cost-intensive, the local council decided to re-roof the church in March 2019 after consultation with the Federal Monuments Office. The municipality itself raised the majority of the funds, with the remaining amount being provided by the St. Sebastian church community, the parish of Mooskirchen and the Federal Monuments Office. Work began back in April 2019, during the course of which it became apparent that the roof truss of the Kreuzkapelle chapel was in danger of collapsing and therefore also needed to be replaced. As part of the roofing work, the plaster on the exterior walls was consolidated with a primer made of sintered water and then re-colored with milk of lime and a colored shadow coating. According to restoration findings, this coloring corresponds to an earlier one. The war memorial in front of the church was also restored.

== Architecture ==
=== Exterior ===
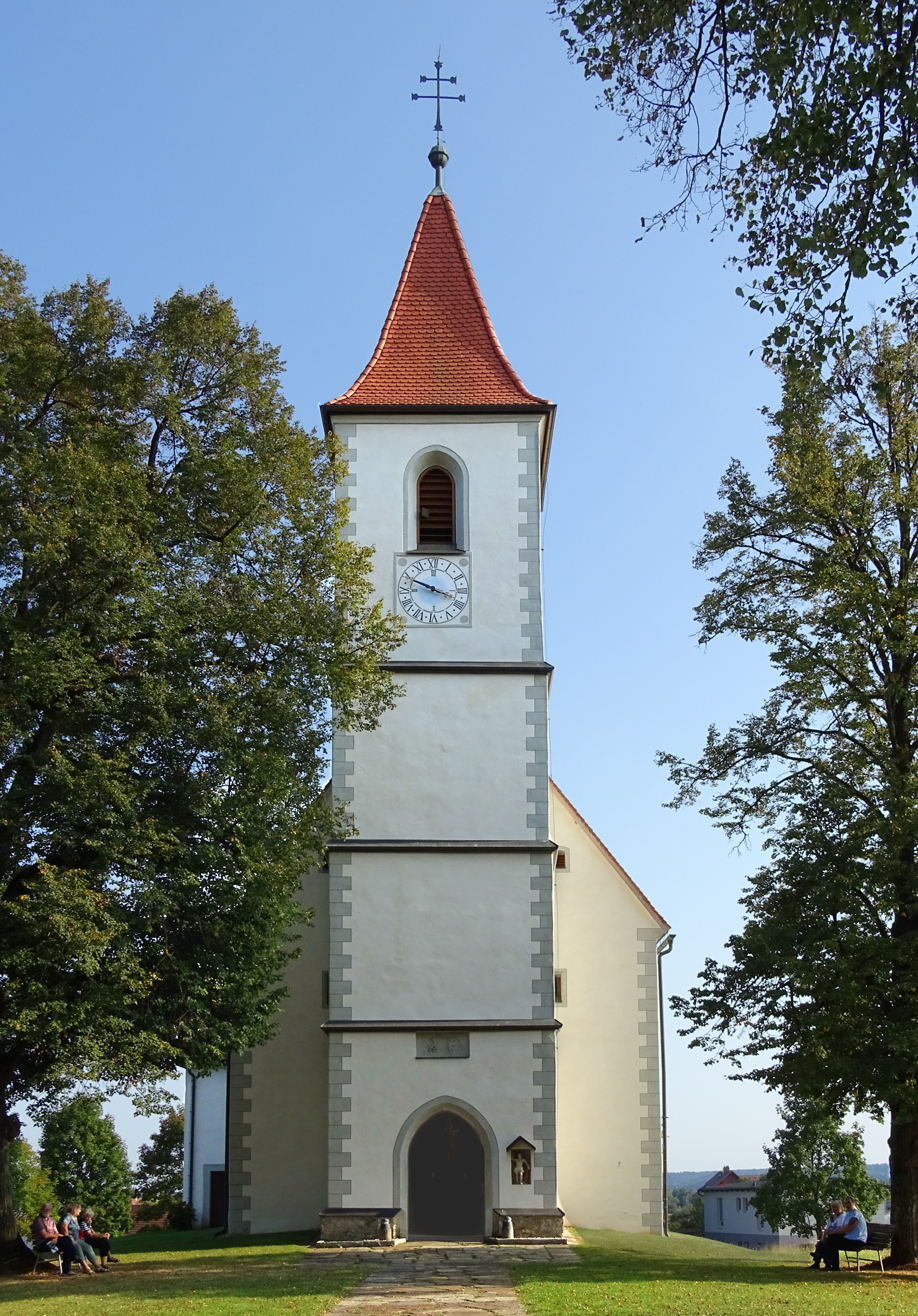
Northwest side of the church with the church tower

The single-nave hall church, which is late Gothic in essence and subsequently baroqueized, with a cross chapel and sacristy attached to the choir, faces south-east.

The exterior walls of the church and tower are kept simple and are divided by painted window frames and quoins. Since a renovation in 2019, the façade has been whitewashed with white limewash, while the painted decorations are in gray. The nave, choir and sacristy have a hipped roof covered with tiles that runs over all the extensions. The cross chapel also has a tiled tent roof. All roof surfaces were re-covered with clay pocket tiles in 2019. The main portal of the church is on the north-west side of the tower; a profiled arched portal forms the middle of the west side of the nave. From north to south, the western portal side of the nave has a barred rectangular window in a round wall niche to the left of the side portal as well as two larger rectangular windows above and south of the side portal, with a painted sundial between them. On the north-eastern façade of the nave, two painted pointed arch windows with reveals can be seen. In the north-west of the nave, adjacent to the church tower, two small barred rectangular windows and two small arched windows above them illuminate the gallery area. The south-western choir wall also has a latticed arched window. There is a pointed arched tracery window on the south and south-eastern side of the choir end. The sacristy has one latticed rectangular window on the ground floor and one on the upper floor on the south-east side and three on the east side. The north-eastern sacristy wall has a door and a walled rectangular window above it.

Completed in 1564, the four-storey church tower with a rectangular ground plan is set in front of the nave in the north-west and has a tent roof. A cross with two crossbeams is placed on a copper spire at the top of the tower. The four storeys are emphasized by stone cornices on the tower façades. On the north-eastern side of the tower, light enters the interior of the upper storeys through three barred rectangular windows. The clock face of the tower clock is located on the top floor on the south-western, north-western and north-eastern sides. Above this, there is a pointed arch window on each of the four sides of the tower. The pointed arched portal on the north-west side leads into the tower hall, from where you can enter the nave. To the right of the portal, a figure of St. Sebastian made of Aflenz sandstone stands in a covered wall niche. This figure is said to be the original high altarpiece. Above the tower portal is a relief from the 16th century which, depending on the interpretation, depicts either two grave guards or the archers who, according to legend, shot at St. Sebastian.

The chapel of the cross, which was added in 1676, is located on the south-eastern outer wall of the choir end. It is only accessible from the outside through an arched portal that can be closed with a wrought-iron grille. The painted inscription "1676" on a semi-circular window above the portal indicates the year of construction. On both the north-eastern and south-western sides, the cross chapel has a rectangular window and a semi-circular window above it.

=== Interior ===
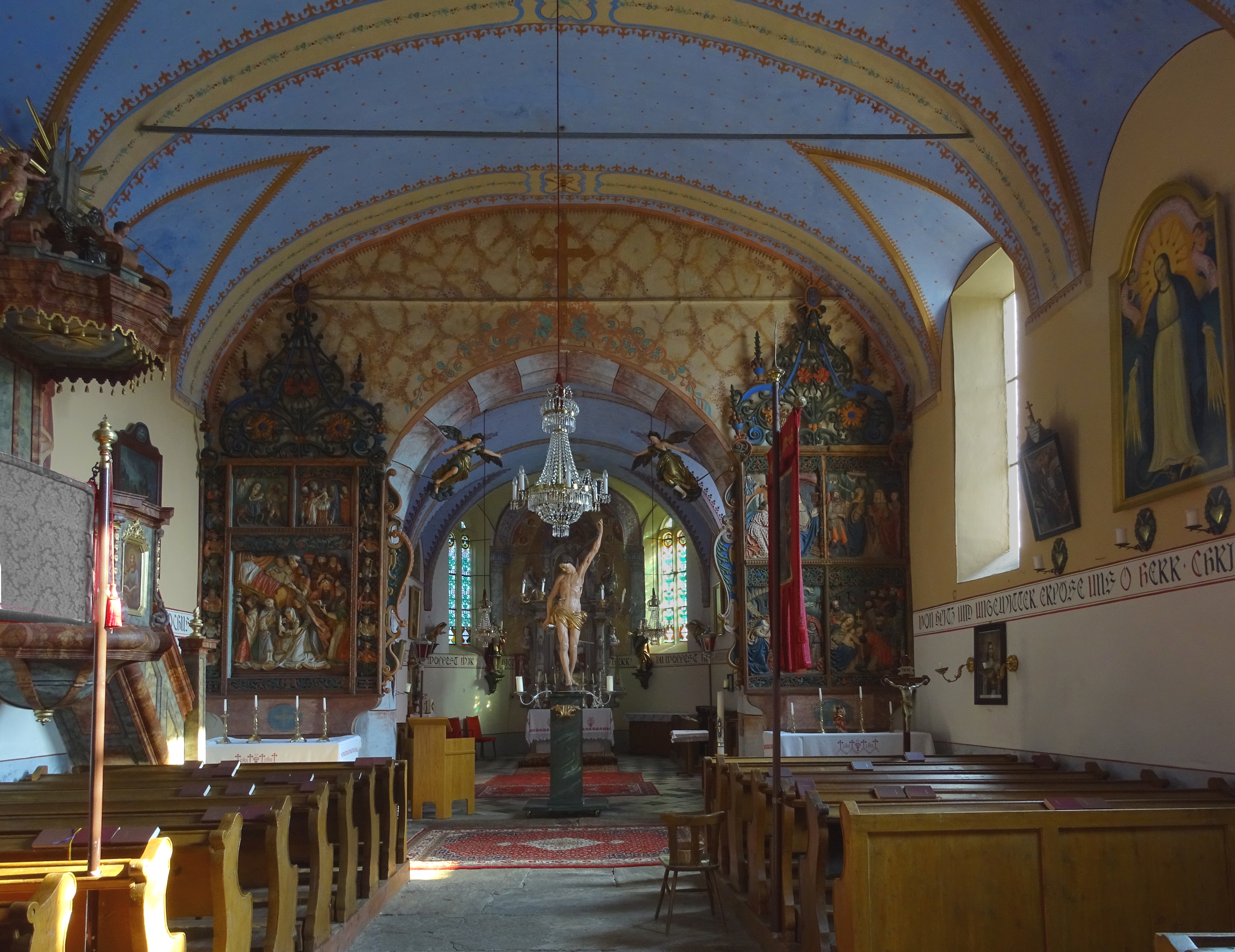
View of the nave with the two side altars, the front arch and the choir with the high altar

The single-aisle, five-bay nave is spanned by a barrel vault. There is a Holy Ghost hole in the third bay. In the north-west of the nave is the three-axis brick-built organ loft supported by a groined vault resting on pillars. A pointed arch portal with roughened bases leads under the gallery from the tower hall into the nave. A staircase in the west of the nave leads up to the organ loft. From the gallery, a shoulder arch portal leads to the upper storeys of the church tower. The windows in the nave are baroque.

The three-bay choir is separated from the nave by a low, recessed front arch. Like the nave, the choir is also spanned by a barrel vault. The choir has a three-eighths closure with two simple Gothic, two-lancet tracery windows. The sacristy, which was added to the east of the choir in the 17th century, has a barrel vault on the first floor. A door leads from the choir into the vestry, from where a staircase leads to the upper floor. Two semi-circular openings in the flat-roofed upper floor of the sacristy allow a view into the choir.

== Facilities ==
=== Choir area ===
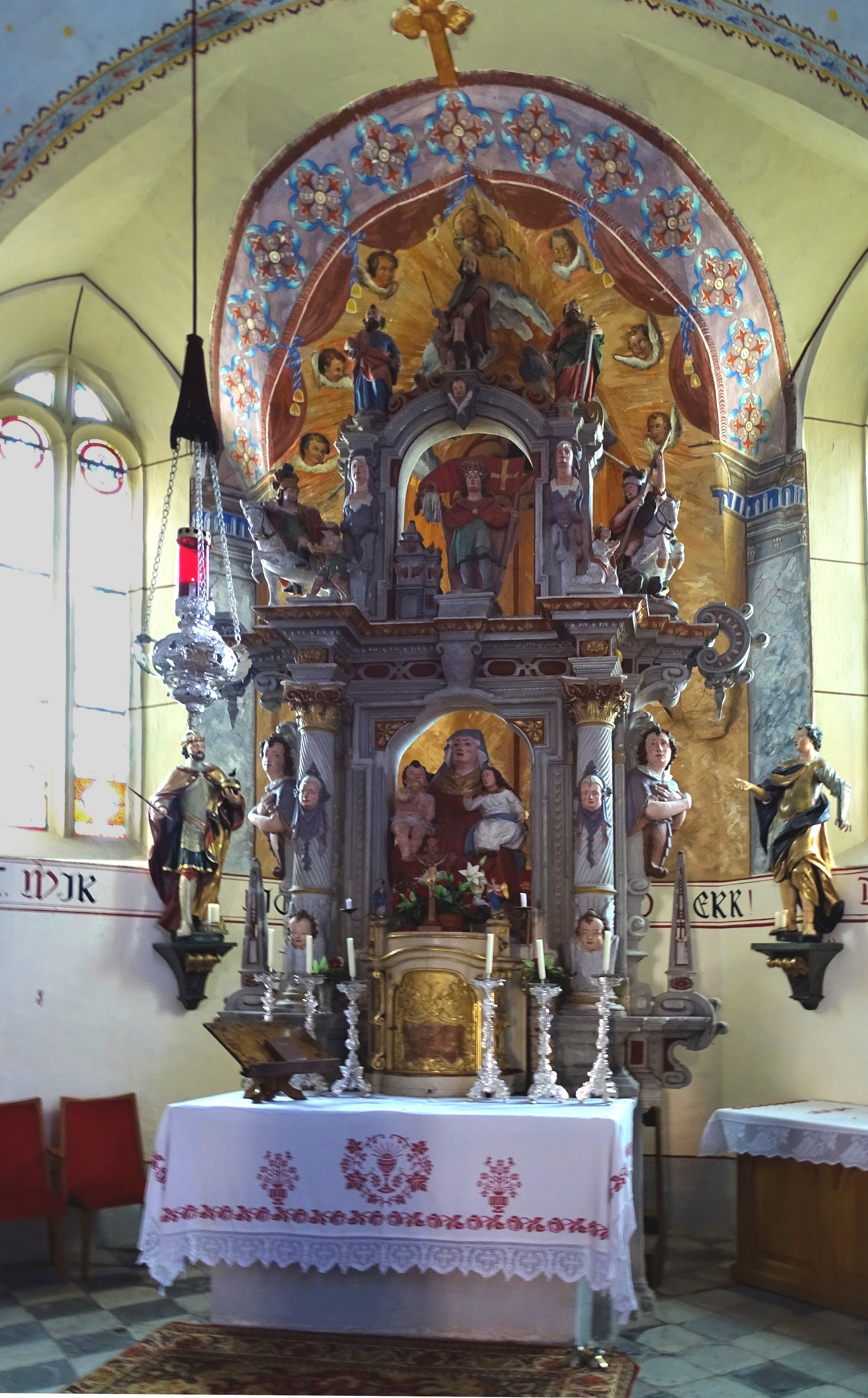
High altar with the altarpiece of St. Anne the Third

The high altar made of colored Aflenzer sandstone was erected around 1630. It has openwork niches in the central part of the structure. In the lower niche is a figure of Anne, whose depiction of Mary was subsequently reworked. A person or angel with crossed arms is depicted on each side of the niche. In the niche above, in the crowning of the altar, stands a statue of St. Florian, flanked by two equestrian figures. The equestrian figure on the left shows St. Martin dividing his cloak for a beggar. The equestrian figure on the right depicts St. George and the praying princess from his legend. The figure of St. Roch forms the upper end of the altar, with two statues of St. Peter and St. Paul to the left and right. All of these figures were probably added to the high altar at a later date; before that, there was probably a figure of St. Sebastian in the main niche and a statue of the Virgin Mary in the coronation. The figure of Sebastian was moved to the niche next to the tower portal. The tabernacle is painted white and decorated with gold. The pillars of the altar are adorned with depictions of human faces.

On either side of the high altar, on the wall of the choir screen, are two larger figures dating from the first half of the 18th century. They were moved here from the parish church in Ligist in the middle of the 19th century and serve as altar guards. The figure on the left shows Saint Oswald of Northumbria, the one on the right St. Pancratius. In addition to these two figures, there is also a figure of an angel on each side of the high altar on the walls of the choir screen. The wall of the choir aisle behind the high altar is decorated with a painted baldachin.

On the north-eastern choir wall, next to the door to the sacristy, there is a small tabernacle altar, also known as the Joglin altar. It dates from the 19th century and was originally made by the farmer Scherzvater for the farmer's wife Feldpeter, known as the pious Joglin, for her farm chapel. After the farmer's wife died, the altar was moved to St. Sebastian's Church. The altar figure of St. Mary stands under a canopy. The upper end contains the monogram of the Virgin Mary. A picture of the Heart of Mary hangs above the altar. A picture of St. Wendelin as a shepherd, donated in 1889, hangs to the left of the altar. On the wall between the sacristy door and the front arch is a crucifix with a figure of Mary praying. A wooden choir stall stands against the south-eastern choir wall. A picture of the heart of Jesus hangs above the choir stalls. To the right of the choir stalls is a stone with the epitaph of the priest Simon Schoper. On both sides of the choir hang a total of six of the church's 14 Stations of the Cross painted by Gerd Linke in 1988. The windows in the choir are decorated with colorful, partly floral ornaments.

In the chancel, the inscription band that was also painted in the nave in 1923 continues: "Pray for us. That you would give and preserve the fruits of the earth, we pray you hear us. O Lord! May you give eternal life to all the benefactors of this church for the sake of your name." The choir vault, painted in blue and decorated with golden stars, is a depiction of heaven. Only the ridges of the spandrels and the painted arches are in a different color and decorated with floral patterns. The monogram IHS is painted above the high altar. The choir side of the frontal arch is marbled and bears the date "1876" at the top.

A life-size statue of St. Sebastian, made in the last third of the 17th century, stands on a movable pedestal under the frontal arch. Above this, two large figures of angels made at the same time by the Graz sculptor Johann Baptist Fischer are attached to the front arch. The wooden ambo stands under the front arch. In 1924, the sculptor Josef Guggi placed a plaque with the coat of arms of the Lords of Roll zu Rollau on the right, southern side of the front arch. A head of Christ hangs on the northern side of the front arch.

=== Nave ===
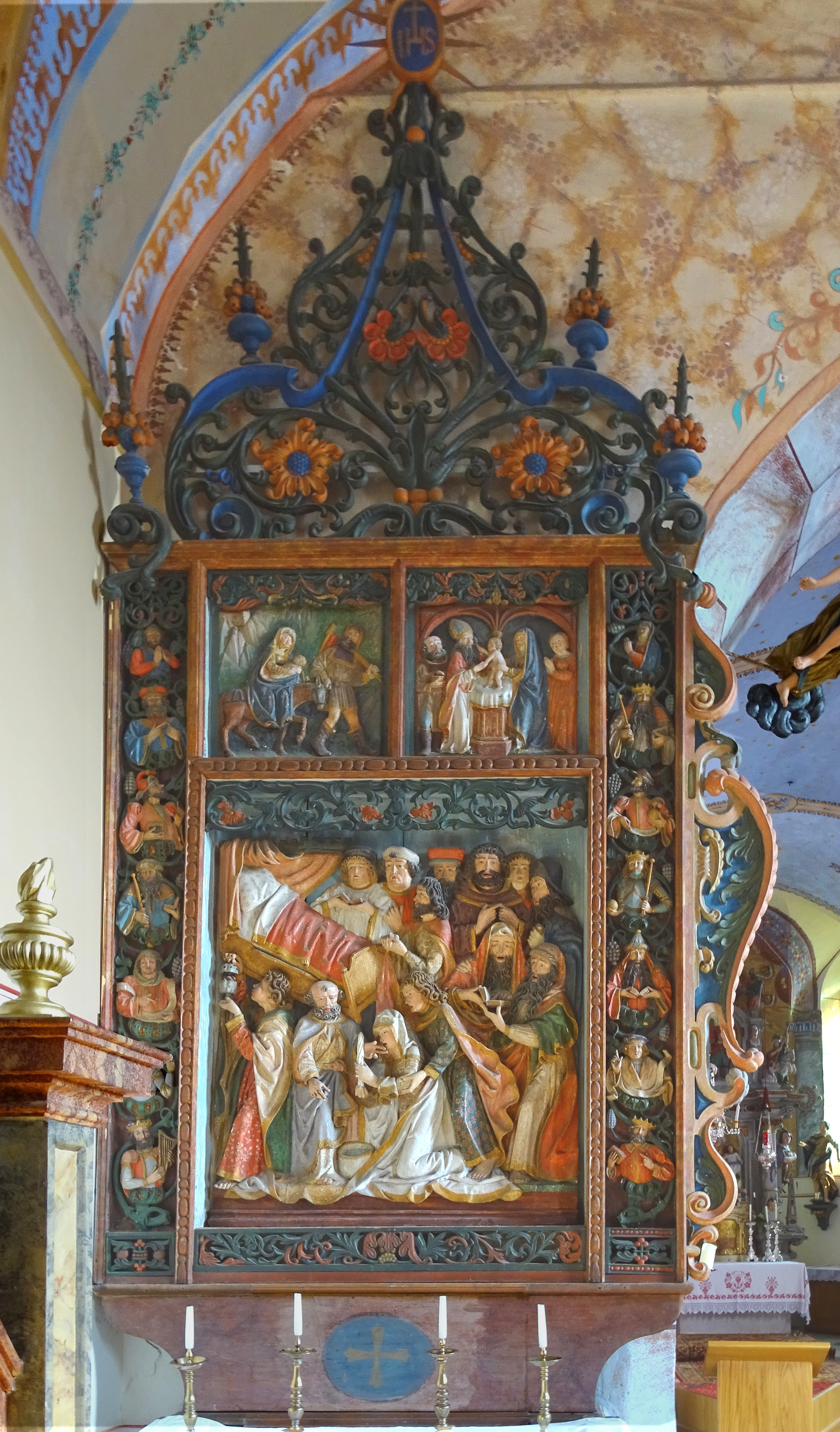
Left side altar

The two side altars were made from parts of a late Gothic three-part winged altar which, according to tradition, came from the parish church in Hitzendorf. The winged altar is said to have been erected in Hitzendorf between 1510 and 1525 and, like the original main picture and one of the two altar wings, came to Kleinsöding in the course of the Baroque redesign of this church around 1630. There they were brought into their present form, fitted with sprung tops as well as side panels and veil boards, the bounces removed and placed at both ends of the front arch. Both altars feature carved reliefs with scenes from the life of Mary. The left side altar was created from the old main image of the Hitzendorf winged altar and shows three reliefs. The large relief depicts the death of Mary. Above it are two depictions of the Flight into Egypt and the Presentation of Jesus in the Temple. The reliefs are framed at the sides by parts of the carved root of Jesse. The right side altar was created from one of the altar wings and shows four reliefs. They show the Annunciation of the Lord, the Visitation of the Virgin Mary, the Nativity and the Adoration of the Magi.

The pulpit was installed on the northern wall of the nave in 1876 by two sculptors and gilders from Hitzendorf. The pulpit is decorated with painted depictions of the four evangelists. On the sounding board are two small angels with a trumpet and two stone tablets with the Ten Commandments. A Latin inscription with an invocation to St. Sebastian has been preserved on the wall in the attic above the pulpit. This was visible from the nave until the church was vaulted in 1676.

On the northern wall of the nave, under the organ loft, there is a statue of Our Lady of Lourdes, flanked on the left by an image of the Heart of Mary and on the right by an image of the Heart of Jesus. The inscription "I am the Immaculate Conception" is painted above the statue. On this wall, between the organ loft and the pulpit, hangs a burial plaque made by the sculptor Josef Guggi on January 19, 1924, which lists the people buried in the church. A picture of the Madonna of the Rosary is placed above this tombstone. On the wall next to the staircase to the pulpit is a picture of the crucifixion of Christ. A picture of a woman of the Apocalypse hangs on the southern wall of the nave. A total of seven of the church's fourteen Stations of the Cross painted by Gerd Linke in 1988 hang on both sides of the nave.

Like the choir, the walls of the nave also have a painted inscription band from 1923, the content of which on the northern wall reads "From plague, famine and war, deliver us, O Lord. St. Sebastian and St. Roch" and then continues in the choir. On the southern wall of the nave, the inscription reads "From lightning and storms, deliver us, O Lord. Christ hear us, Christ hear us.". The vault, painted in blue and decorated with golden stars, is a depiction of the heavens. As in the chancel, the ridges of the spandrels and the painted arches are painted in a different color and decorated with floral patterns. The Holy Ghost hole contains a depiction of Christ. The front arch is marbled on the nave side with painted stone blocks on the reveal. A painted cross adorns the apex of the arch. The organ loft has a painted balustrade and the reveals of the arches on which it rests are marbled. An inscription above the organ loft commemorates the construction of the nave in 1562. The windows in the nave are simple and have no ornamentation.

=== Chapel of the Cross ===
In the Chapel of the Cross stands the altar of the cross with a crucifix flanked by two statues of St. Roch and St. Sebastian, all made around 1676. A statue of the Virgin Mary stands in front of the crucifix. Originally, the crucifix formed a crucifixion group together with two high Gothic figures of Mary and St. John the Apostle. However, the two figures were stolen from the chapel on the night of February 6, 1968 and have been missing ever since.

== Organ ==
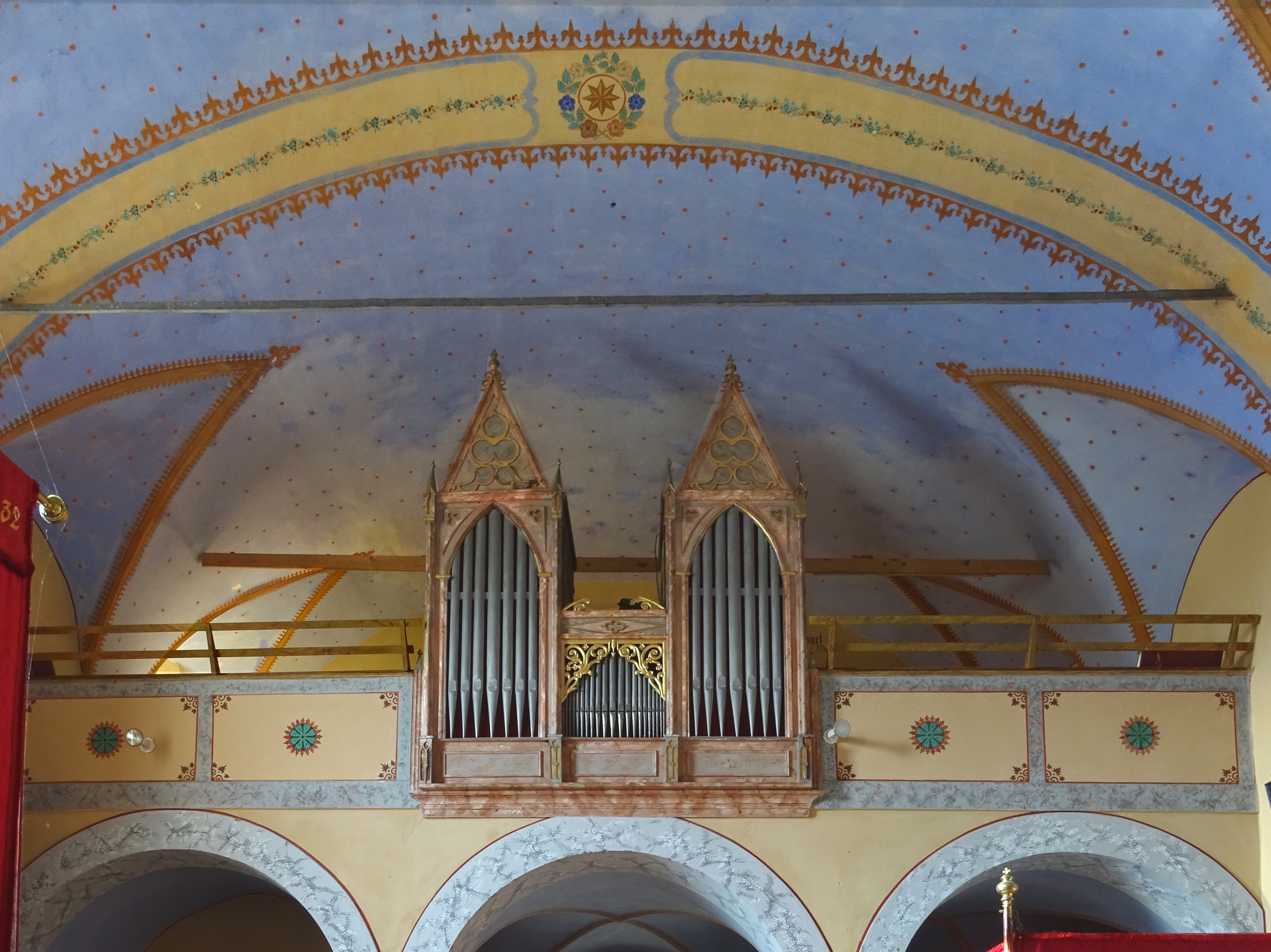
View of the Organ Loft

According to tradition, the organ, a baroque parapet positive, was installed around 1690 by a South Tyrolean organ builder. Philipp Fischer rebuilt the organ in 1867 and extended it to six stops. An inscription on the windchest refers to this conversion. 15 of the old façade pipes had to be delivered as a "metal donation" during the First World War in 1917. At Whitsun 1923, the out-of-tune organ was repaired and cleaned - only two of the stops were still working properly. The carpentry work was carried out by church provost Stadler. In 1980, the organ, which had been defective for 18 years at the time, was restored by the Graz organ builders Gebrüder Krenn. Parts of the Baroque organ have been preserved and some of the 300 or so organ pipes date back to the 17th century.

The organ builder Gottfried Gschier from Mooskirchen cleaned, repaired and retuned the organ in 2004. The organ was cleaned and restored again by Ulrich Aschermann in September 2020.

== Bells ==
Three bells hang in the church tower. The oldest of these bells was cast by Florentin Streckfuß in Graz in 1710 and hoisted in 1711. A bell cast by Salesius Feltl in 1794 was originally donated by Marianna Countess von Saurau for the parish church of Sankt Johann ob Hohenburg. It was sold to Kleinsöding in 1923 and consecrated and raised on April 29 of that year. The tin bronze Floriani bell was cast on May 24, 1985 and consecrated and wound on June 30 of that year.

In the 17th century, the peal consisted of at least three bells, one of which was cast by Lorenz Selner in 1675. At the beginning of the 18th century, the bells were extended by the bell from Florentin Streckfuß. Three old bells were melted down in 1860 and replaced by three new bells cast by Johann Feltl in Graz. On May 25, 1860, a 798-kilogram bell with images of St. Sebastian and Mother Anne and a 215-kilogram bell with images of the apostles Simon Peter and Paul were raised. The third bell by Feltl followed on May 25, 1861. In 1917, two of the bells had to be removed for war purposes, with only the oldest being spared due to their historical value. These included a 2000 kilogram bell known as the Jockl, which was probably cast before 1600. As a so-called artificial casting, it would have been exempt from delivery, but the news only reached the parish after the bell had already been smashed. The bell cast by Salesius Feltl was also originally supposed to be delivered, but a farmer paid the soldiers in charge a barrel of beer so that they would accept a smaller bell. On January 20, 1942, the two bells cast in 1711 and 1794 were removed, but not delivered and could be raised again in 1945. Although the bell cast by Lorenz Selner in 1675 is mentioned in the literature as being present in the church inventory after the Second World War, it no longer exists.

The current peal comprises the following three bells:

No	Name	Casting year	Foundry, casting location	Diameter (cm)	Mass (kg)	Strike tone	Bell ornament
1	–	1710	Florentin Streckfuss, Graz				Depictions of St. Roch, St. Sebastian, St. Gregory and St. Augustine
2	–	1794	Salesius Feltl, Graz			h′	Images of Mary with child, John the Baptist, John Nepomuk and Florian
3	Florianiglocke	1985	Glockengiesserei Grassmayr, Innsbruck		120	e″	-

== Customs ==
The Sebastianikirche has been a branch and pilgrimage church of the parish of Mooskirchen since its construction. In the 17th century, it developed into the most important plague sanctuary in western Styria, but lost importance after the plague outbreaks subsided. On November 9, 1618, Gregor Gruebpauer and Sebastian Függerle were the first documented church priests and on August 14, 1684, Michael Strasser was the first documented sacristan. Barbara Mayer, the first female sacristan, is also mentioned on January 26, 1694. At least in the 19th century, several annual markets were held at the church, but until the 21st century only those on St. Sebastian's Day (January 20) and on the Sunday after Peter and Paul (June 29) survived. Mass is said on January 20th and the following Sunday. On St. Mark's Day (April 25), a procession moves from the parish church in Mooskirchen to Kleinsöding. Three days before Ascension Day, a procession of supplication is held in the church.

Weddings and baptisms have been celebrated in the church since at least the second half of the 20th century. It is also frequently used as a venue for choir and orchestra concerts. There has been a Christmas carol service since 1970, and in 1979, the non-profit St. Sebastian Church Community was founded with the aim of preserving St. Sebastian's Church.

In the 21st century, there is still an influx of pilgrims. On St. Margaret's Day (July 20), for example, the residents of Berndorf near Hitzendorf make a pilgrimage to St. Sebastian's Church. If July 20th is a Sunday, the pilgrimage is postponed. This pilgrimage probably goes back to the time of the plague, which only seven inhabitants of Berndorf are said to have survived. Originally it led from Hitzendorf via the chapel near Berndorf and then on to Kleinsöding, but Berndorf is now the starting point of the pilgrimage. However, there are also pilgrims from other villages. For example, on Easter Monday the inhabitants of St. Bartholomew and on Whit Tuesday the inhabitants of St. Johann ob Hohenburg make a pilgrimage to the church. Nothing is known about the origins of these pilgrimages.

Since the 17th century, the so-called Maschta, a procession of martyrs to the parish church in Mooskirchen, has been held on Easter Sunday in thanksgiving for salvation from the plague. Maschta is the local dialect term for martyrdom, in the sense of pain, torture and martyrdom. In addition to the residents of Kleinsöding, the residents of Großsöding, Fluttendorf and Stögersdorf also go to Mooskirchen. Only residents of the respective village walk in the procession and at least one person from each house should be present; only the men are allowed to sing the traditional masquerade songs. Each of these four groups carries a cross of martyrdom with ten or twelve candles and draped with blue or purple cloths.

== Coat of arms ==
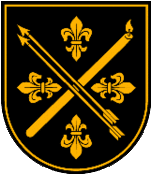
The old coat of arms of the municipality of Söding, valid until 2015. The two arrows and the candle refer to the patron saint of the church and a popular custom

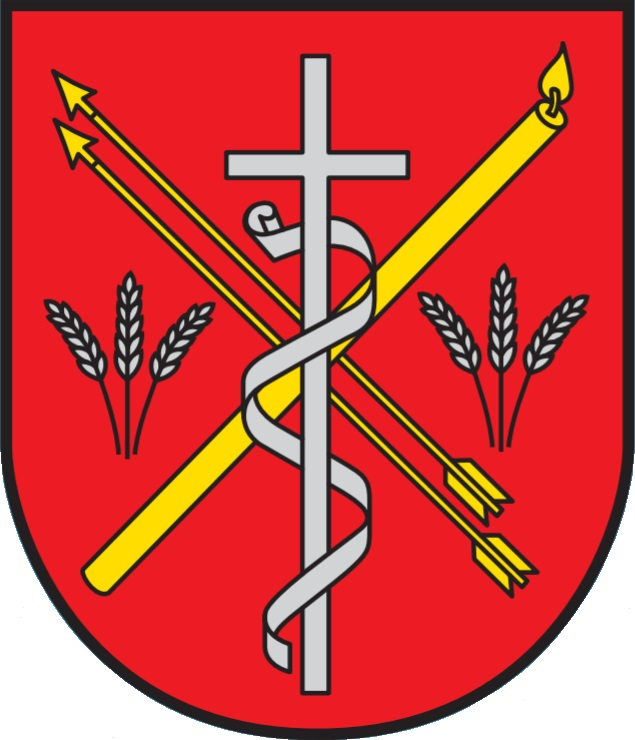
The new coat of arms of the municipality of Söding-Sankt Johann, awarded in 2021, also shows two arrows and a candle

The municipal coat of arms granted on February 18, 1985 and designed by Heinrich Purkarthofer, which was valid until the merger of Söding with Sankt Johann-Köppling as part of the Styrian municipal reform on January 1, 2015, indirectly refers to the branch church of Kleinsöding. The blazon reads: "In black, two golden arrows diagonally crossed with a burning golden candle, angled by cross-shaped golden lilies." The two arrows refer to the martyrdom of St. Sebastian. The candle refers to the popular custom of the wax sacrifice and the candle-covered presentation cross, which is carried from the branch church to Mooskirchen during the procession and the mashtas singing.

The new municipal coat of arms of Söding-Sankt Johann, which was granted on June 17, 2021, also makes indirect reference to the branch church. The blazon of this coat of arms reads: "In a red shield, a silver cross staff in a pole, around which a banner is wrapped, underlaid by two golden arrows crossed diagonally with a golden burning candle, each bar removed by three silver corn stalks, the outer ones of which are bent." As in the old municipal coat of arms, the two arrows and the candle in the new coat of arms also refer to the patron saint of the church and the popular custom associated with the church.
