= L'Aubépin =

- Part of Les Trois-Châteaux
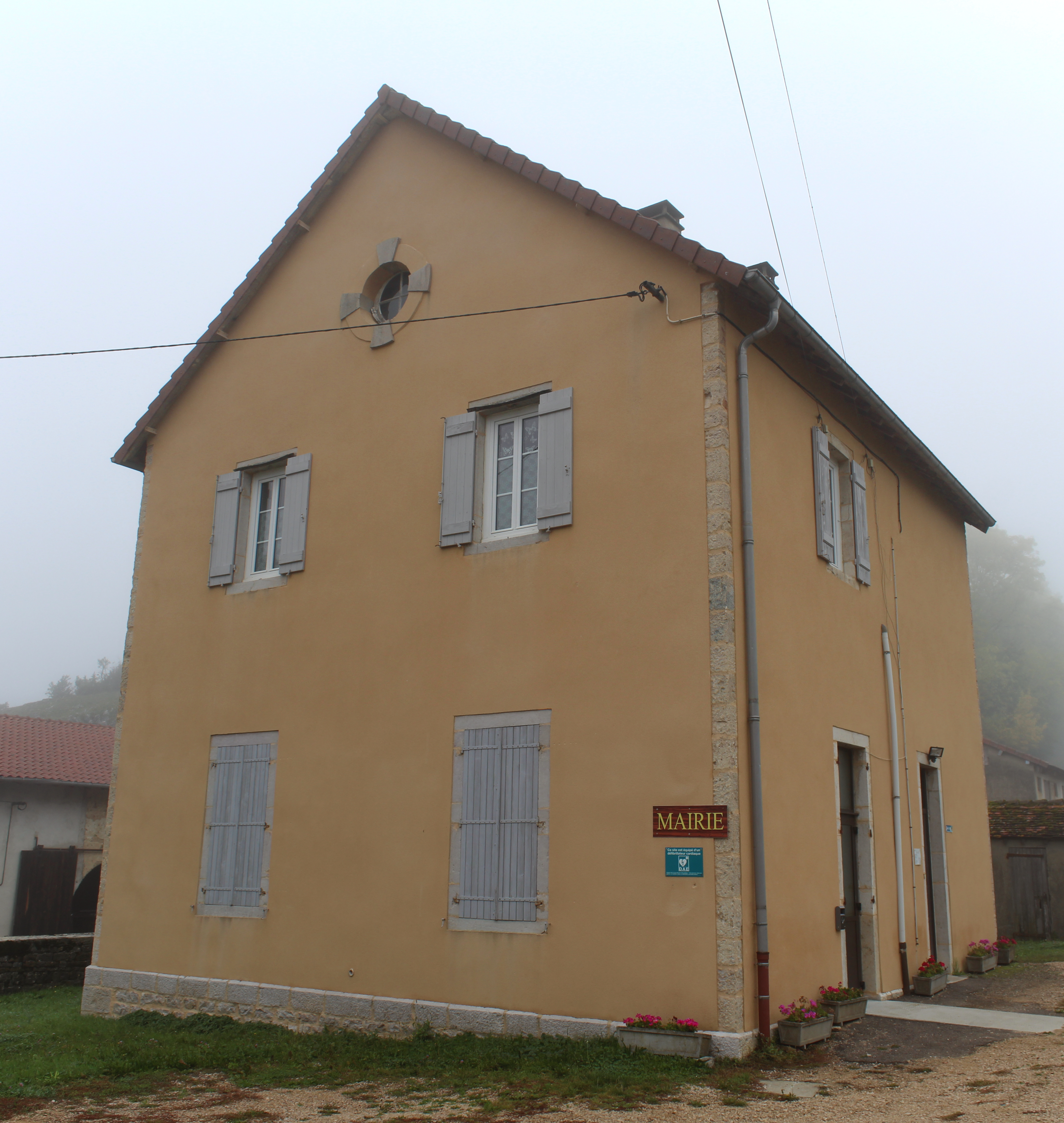
- Town hall

- Coat of arms
- Location of L'Aubépin
- Location within France Location within Bourgogne-Franche-Comté
- Coordinates: 46°26′25″N 5°22′27″E
- Country: France
- Region: Bourgogne-Franche-Comté
- Department: Jura
- Arrondissement: Lons-le-Saunier
- Canton: Saint-Amour
- Commune: Les Trois-Châteaux
- Area^{1}: 5.67 km^{2} (2.19 sq mi)
- Highest elevation: 590 m (1,940 ft)
- Lowest elevation: 325 m (1,066 ft)
- Population (2018): 161
  - Density: 28.4/km^{2} (73.5/sq mi)
- Time zone: UTC+01:00 (CET)
  - Summer (DST): UTC+02:00 (CEST)
- Postal code: 39160
- ^{1} French Land Register data, which excludes lakes, ponds, glaciers > 1 km^{2} (0.386 sq mi or 247 acres) and river estuaries.

L'Aubépin (French pronunciation: [lobepɛ̃]) is a former commune in the Jura department in the region of Bourgogne-Franche-Comté in eastern France. On 1 April 2016, it was merged into the new commune of Les Trois-Châteaux.

== See also ==
- Communes of the Jura department
