= Söding-Sankt Johann =

- Municipality
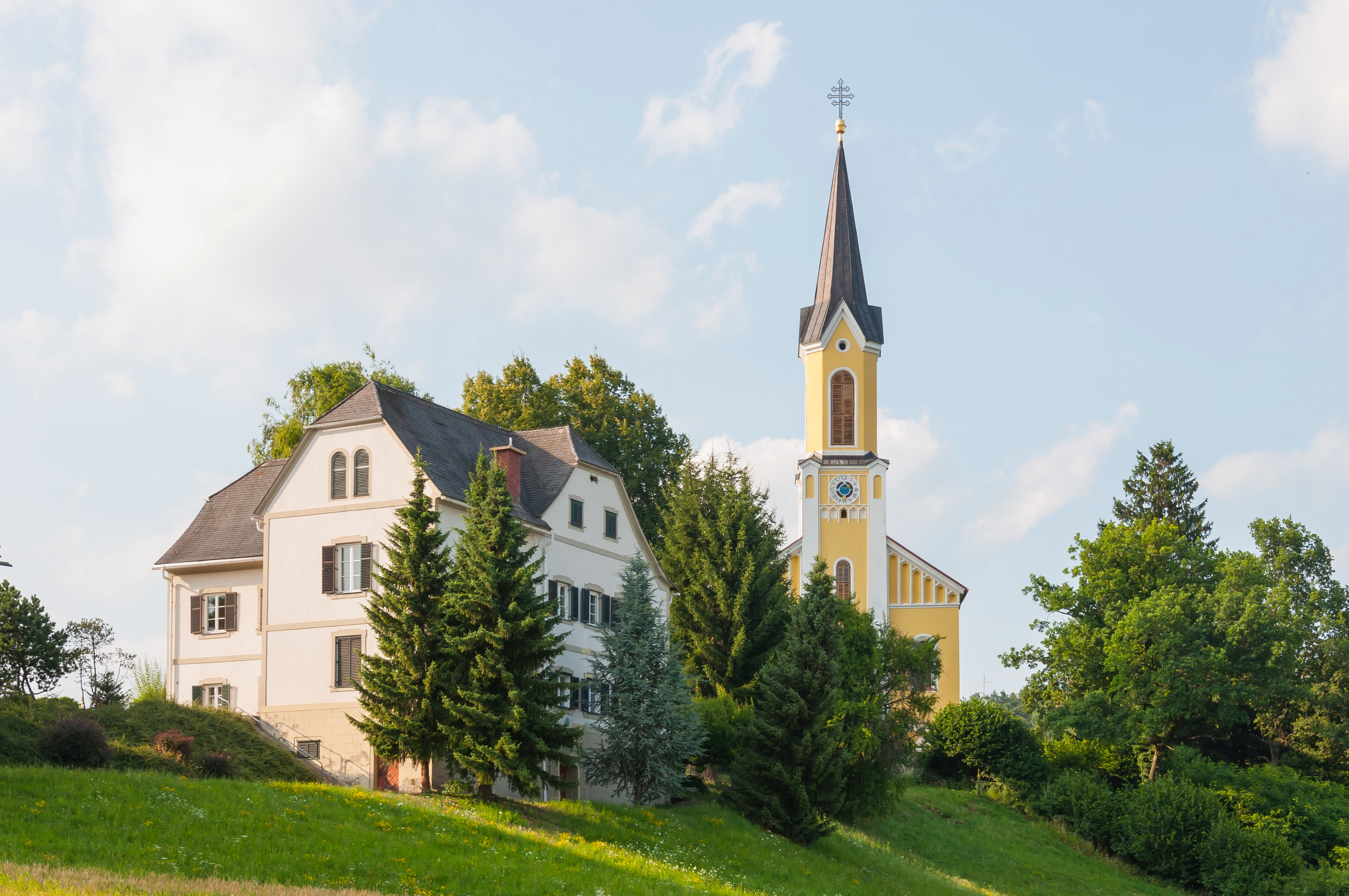
- Söding-Sankt Johann parish church

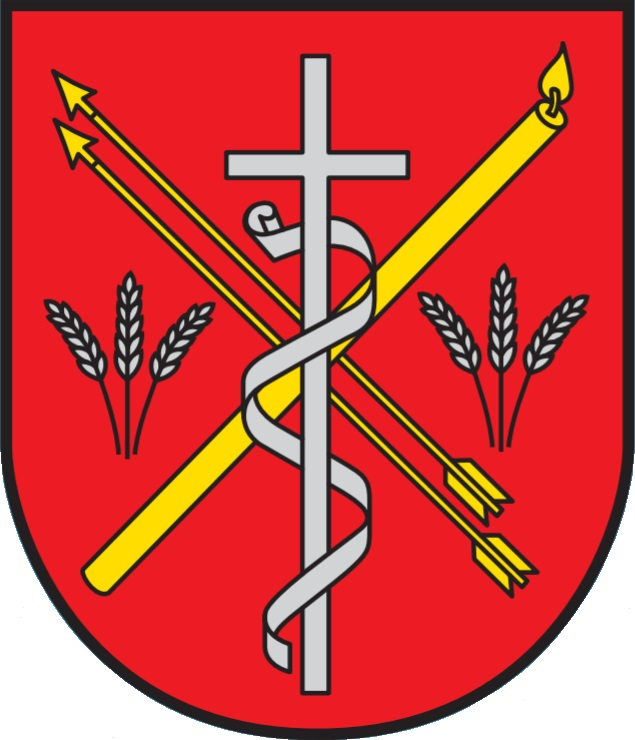
- Coat of arms

- Location within Austria
- Coordinates: 47°00′00″N 15°17′23″E
- Country: Austria
- State: Styria
- District: Voitsberg

Government
  - Mayor: Erwin Dirnberger (ÖVP)

Area
  - Total: 19.37 km^{2} (7.48 sq mi)
- Elevation: 380 m (1,250 ft)

Population (2018-01-01)
  - Total: 4,091
  - Density: 211.2/km^{2} (547.0/sq mi)
- Time zone: UTC+1 (CET)
  - Summer (DST): UTC+2 (CEST)
- Postal code: 8561, 8152, 8564, 8565
- Area code: 03137
- Website: soeding-st-johann.gv.at – Website der Gemeinde

Söding-Sankt Johann is since 2015 a municipality with 4,043 residents (as of 1 January 2016) in Voitsberg District in Styria, Austria.

The municipality Söding-Sankt Johann was created as part of the Styria municipal structural reform, at the end of 2014, by merging the former towns Söding and Sankt Johann-Köppling.

The municipality includes the pilgrimage church of St Sebastian in Kleinsöding.

== Geography ==
Söding-Sankt Johann lies southwest of Graz.

== Municipality arrangement ==
The municipality territory includes the following 10 sections (population as of 1 January 2016):

- Großsöding (672)
- Hallersdorf (256)
- Hausdorf (128)
- Kleinsöding (1,000)
- Köppling (504)
- Moosing (260)
- Muggauberg (192)
- Neudorf bei Sankt Johann ob Hohenburg (119)
- Pichling bei Mooskirchen (518)
- Sankt Johann ob Hohenburg (393)

The municipality consists of the Katastralgemeinden Großsöding, Hallersdorf, Hausdorf, Kleinsöding, Köppling, Moosing, Neudorf bei St. Johann, Pichling bei Mooskirchen and St. Johann ob Hohenburg.

== Transport ==
Söding-Sankt Johann has two stations, Söding-Mooskirchen and Köppling, on the Köflach railway line, which runs between Graz Hauptbahnhof and Köflach. The Styria S-Bahn stops at both stations.
