= Saint-Georges-du-Mesnil =

- Part of Le Mesnil-Saint-Jean
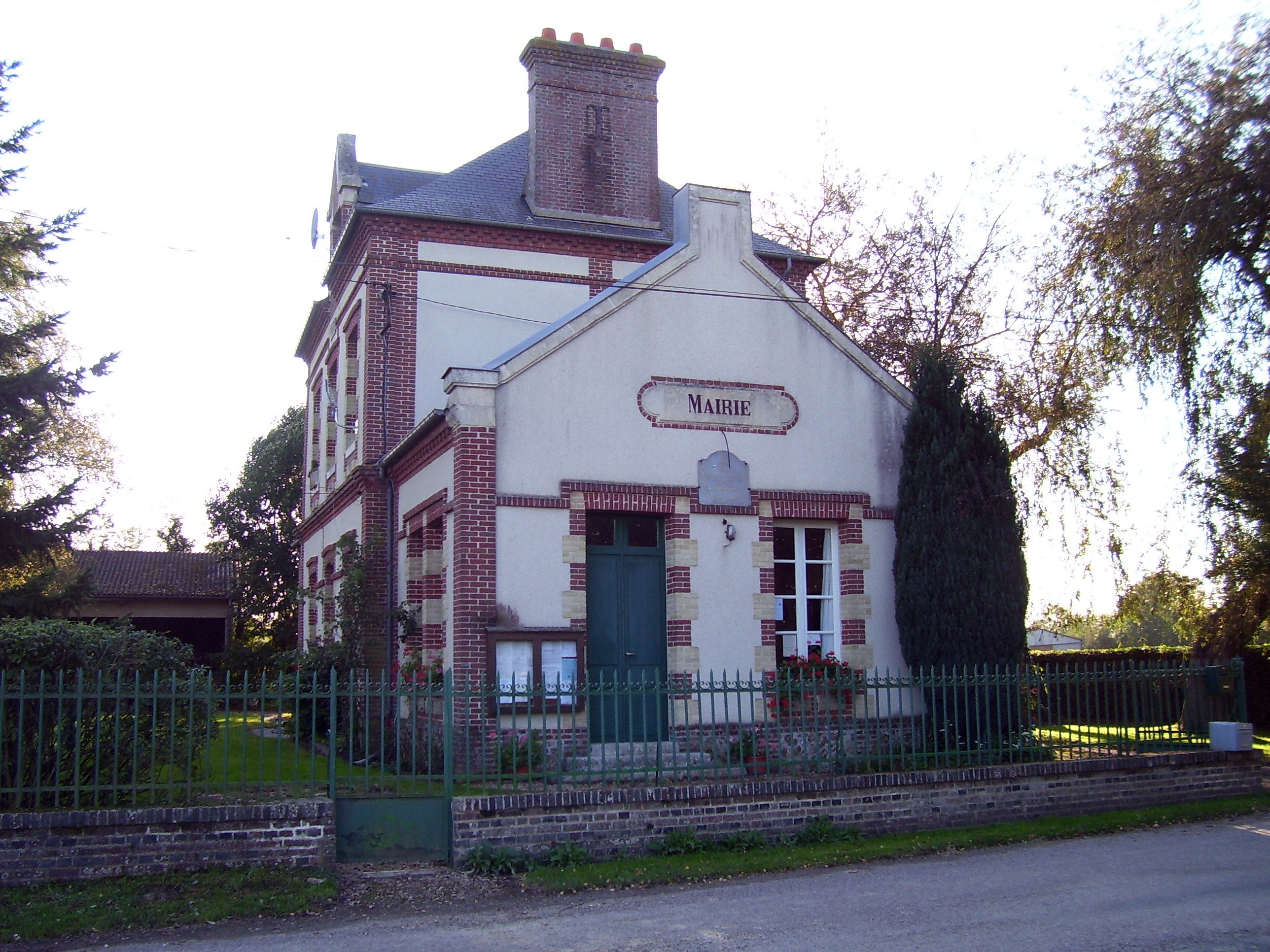
- Town hall
- Location of Saint-Georges-du-Mesnil
- Location within France Location within Normandy
- Coordinates: 49°12′47″N 0°33′31″E
- Country: France
- Region: Normandy
- Department: Eure
- Arrondissement: Bernay
- Canton: Beuzeville
- Commune: Le Mesnil-Saint-Jean
- Area^{1}: 3.18 km^{2} (1.23 sq mi)
- Highest elevation: 171 m (561 ft)
- Lowest elevation: 150 m (490 ft)
- Population (2019): 152
  - Density: 47.8/km^{2} (124/sq mi)
- Time zone: UTC+01:00 (CET)
  - Summer (DST): UTC+02:00 (CEST)
- Postal code: 27560
- ^{1} French Land Register data, which excludes lakes, ponds, glaciers > 1 km^{2} (0.386 sq mi or 247 acres) and river estuaries.

Saint-Georges-du-Mesnil (French pronunciation: [sɛ̃ ʒɔʁʒ dy menil]) is a former commune in the Eure department in Normandy in northern France. On 1 January 2019, it was merged into the new commune Le Mesnil-Saint-Jean.

== See also ==
- Communes of the Eure department
