= Le Mesnil-Saint-Jean =

- Commune
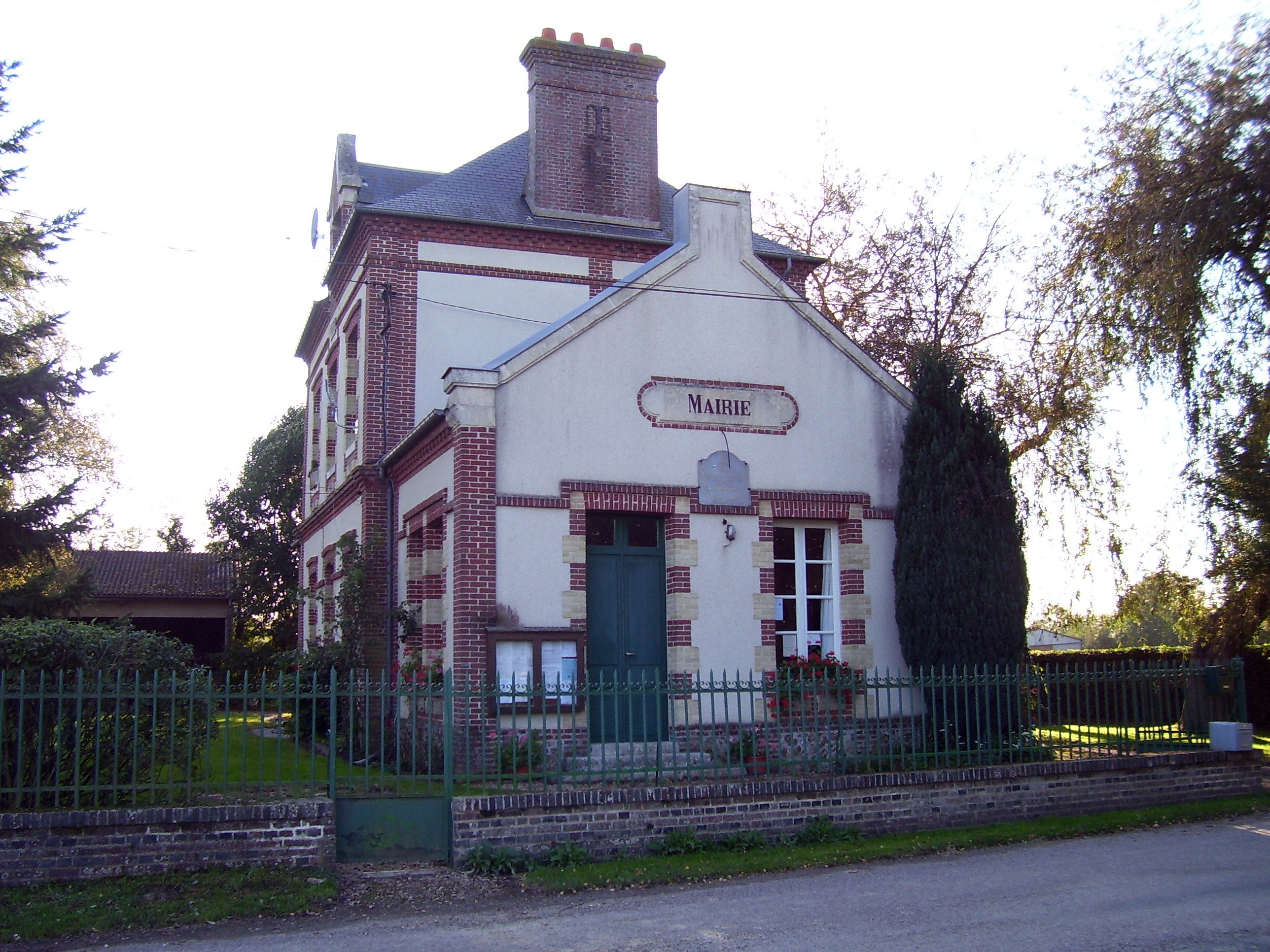
- Town hall
- Location of Le Mesnil-Saint-Jean
- Location within France Location within Normandy
- Coordinates: 49°12′47″N 0°33′31″E
- Country: France
- Region: Normandy
- Department: Eure
- Arrondissement: Bernay
- Canton: Beuzeville
- Intercommunality: Lieuvin Pays d'Auge

Government
  - Mayor (2020–2026): Philippe Leroux
- Area^{1}: 7.85 km^{2} (3.03 sq mi)
- Highest elevation: 171 m (561 ft)
- Lowest elevation: 120 m (390 ft)
- Population (2023): 161
  - Density: 20.5/km^{2} (53.1/sq mi)
- Time zone: UTC+01:00 (CET)
  - Summer (DST): UTC+02:00 (CEST)
- INSEE/Postal code: 27541 /27560
- ^{1} French Land Register data, which excludes lakes, ponds, glaciers > 1 km^{2} (0.386 sq mi or 247 acres) and river estuaries.

Le Mesnil-Saint-Jean (French pronunciation: [lə menil sɛ̃ ʒɑ̃]) is a commune in the Eure department in Normandy in northern France. It was established on 1 January 2019 by merger of the former communes of Saint-Georges-du-Mesnil (the seat) and Saint-Jean-de-la-Léqueraye.

== See also ==
- Communes of the Eure department
