= Söding =

- Former municipality
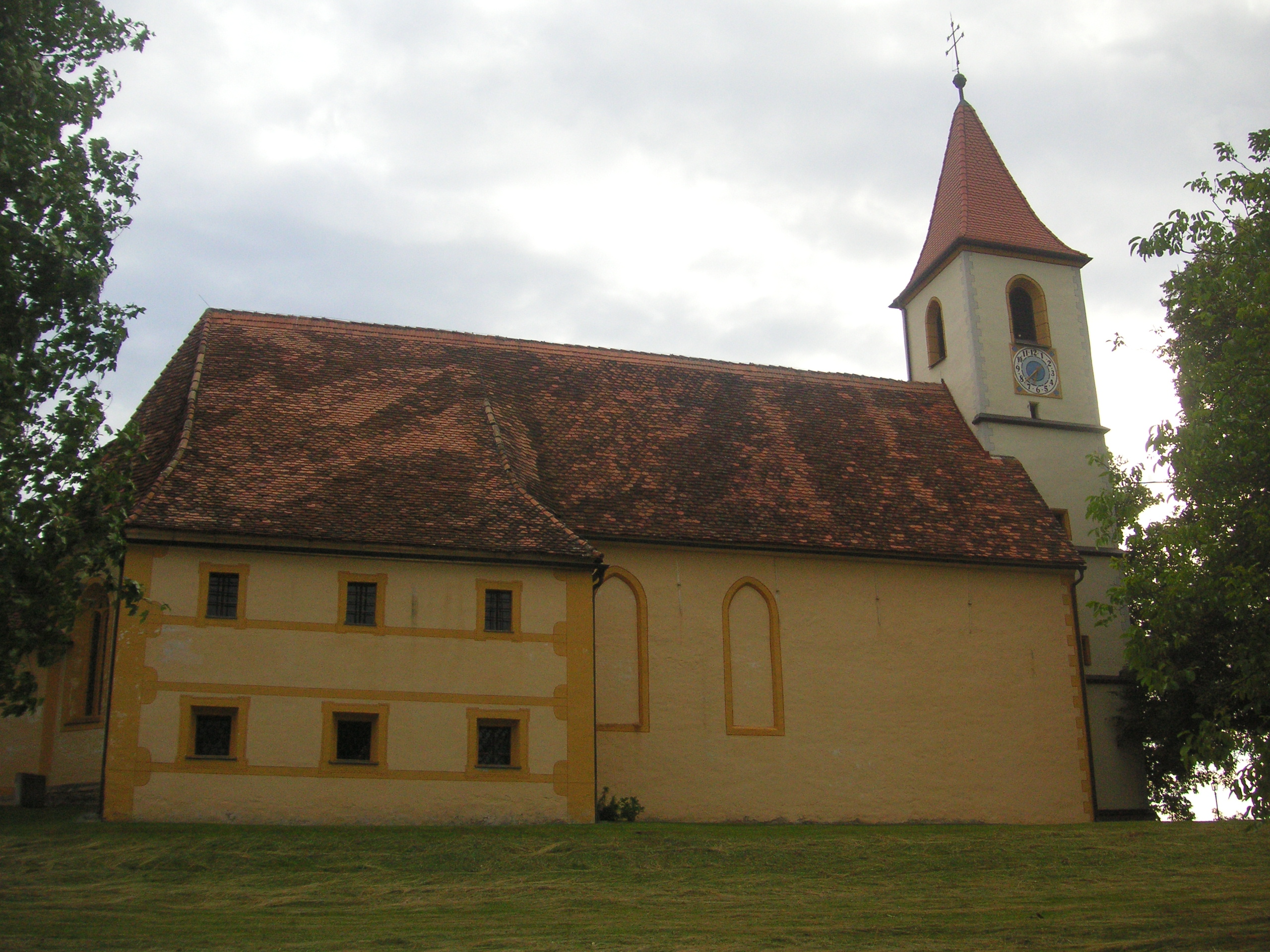
- Catholic church in Söding

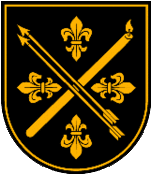
- Coat of arms

- Location within Austria
- Coordinates: 47°00′00″N 15°17′23″E
- Country: Austria
- State: Styria
- District: Voitsberg

Area
  - Total: 9.1 km^{2} (3.5 sq mi)
- Elevation: 380 m (1,250 ft)

Population (1 January 2016)
  - Total: 2,186
  - Density: 240/km^{2} (620/sq mi)
- Time zone: UTC+1 (CET)
  - Summer (DST): UTC+2 (CEST)
- Postal code: 8561
- Area code: 03137
- Vehicle registration: VO
- Website: www.soeding.at

Söding is a former municipality in the district of Voitsberg in the Austrian state of Styria. Since the 2015 Styria municipal structural reform, it has been a part of the municipality Söding-Sankt Johann.

== Geography ==
Söding lies southwest of Graz.
