= Saint Juan =

Saint Juan may refer to:

== People ==
- Saint Juan Capistrano (1386–1456), born Giovanni da Capistrano, Franciscan priest, theologian, and inquisitor from Italy, known as the "Soldier Saint"
- John of Avila (1500–1569), also known as Saint John of Avila, Spanish apostolic preacher, author, mystic and saint, canonized in 1970
- Saint Juan de la Cruz (1542–1591), born Juan de Yepes Alvarez, a major figure of the Catholic Reformation in Spain
- Saint Juan de Ribera (1532–1611), patriarch of Antioch, Commander in Chief, president of the Audiencia, and Chancellor of the University of Valencia
- Saint John of Sahagún (1419–1479), also known as Saint John of San Facondo, confessor, celebrated Spanish preacher
- Saint Juan Diego (1474–1548), indigenous Mexican who reported a Marian apparition
- Saint Juan Macias (1585–1645), born Juan de Arcas Sanchez, also known as Saint John de Massias, Spanish Dominican laybrother who evangelized in Peru

== Places ==
- Saint-Juan, a city in the department of Doubs, France

== See also ==
- Saint-Jean (disambiguation)
- Saint John (disambiguation)
- Sant Joan (disambiguation)
- San Giovanni (disambiguation)
- San Juan (disambiguation)
- São João (disambiguation)
- St. Johann (disambiguation)
