= Climate Data Analysis Tool =

Software used in atmospheric sciences and climatology

The Climate Data Analysis Tool (CDAT) is plotting software used in atmospheric sciences and climatology.

CDAT is a software used in atmospheric sciences and climatology to display meteorological fields such as pressure, temperature, or wind speeds. It allows to read gridded meteorological data in different formats such as netCDF or GRIB and plot time series of displays from several identical datasets with differing times. It is similar in scope to GrADS but with more extensive user interface and capabilities.
