= Les Trois-Châteaux =

- Commune
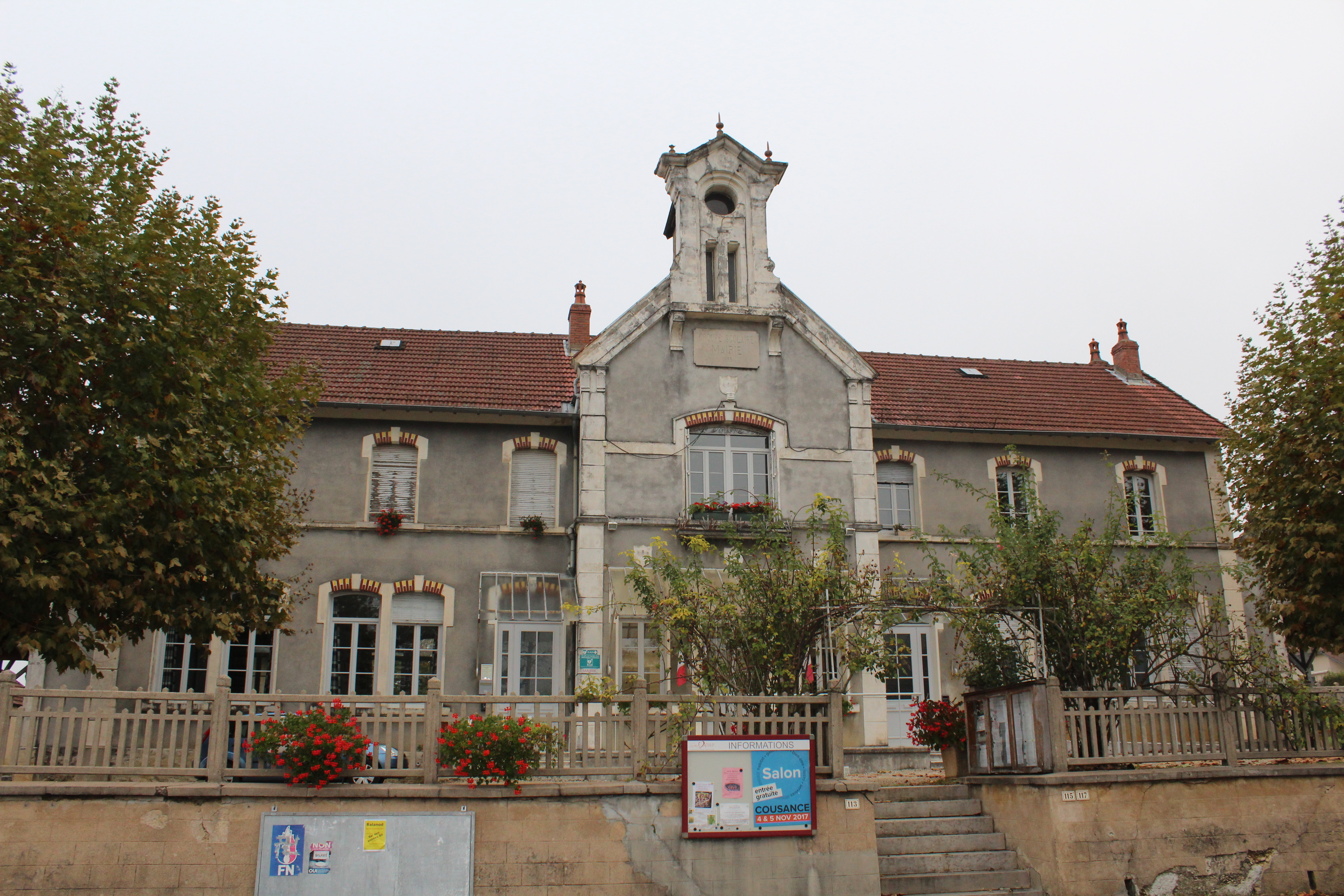
- The town hall in Nanc-lès-Saint-Amour
- Location of Les Trois-Châteaux
- Location within France Location within Bourgogne-Franche-Comté
- Coordinates: 46°25′19″N 5°21′29″E
- Country: France
- Region: Bourgogne-Franche-Comté
- Department: Jura
- Arrondissement: Lons-le-Saunier
- Canton: Saint-Amour
- Intercommunality: Porte du Jura
- Area^{1}: 19.28 km^{2} (7.44 sq mi)
- Highest elevation: 596 m (1,955 ft)
- Lowest elevation: 199 m (653 ft)
- Population (2023): 772
  - Density: 40.0/km^{2} (104/sq mi)
- Time zone: UTC+01:00 (CET)
  - Summer (DST): UTC+02:00 (CEST)
- INSEE/Postal code: 39378 /39160
- ^{1} French Land Register data, which excludes lakes, ponds, glaciers > 1 km^{2} (0.386 sq mi or 247 acres) and river estuaries.

Les Trois-Châteaux (French pronunciation: [le tʁwɑ ʃɑto]; "The Three Castles") is a commune in the Jura department of eastern France. The municipality was established on 1 April 2016 by the merger of the former communes of L'Aubépin, Chazelles and Nanc-lès-Saint-Amour (the seat). On 1 January 2019, the former commune Saint-Jean-d'Étreux was merged into Les Trois-Châteaux.

== See also ==
- Communes of the Jura department
