= Sankt Johann, Mayen-Koblenz =

Sankt Johann
- Municipality
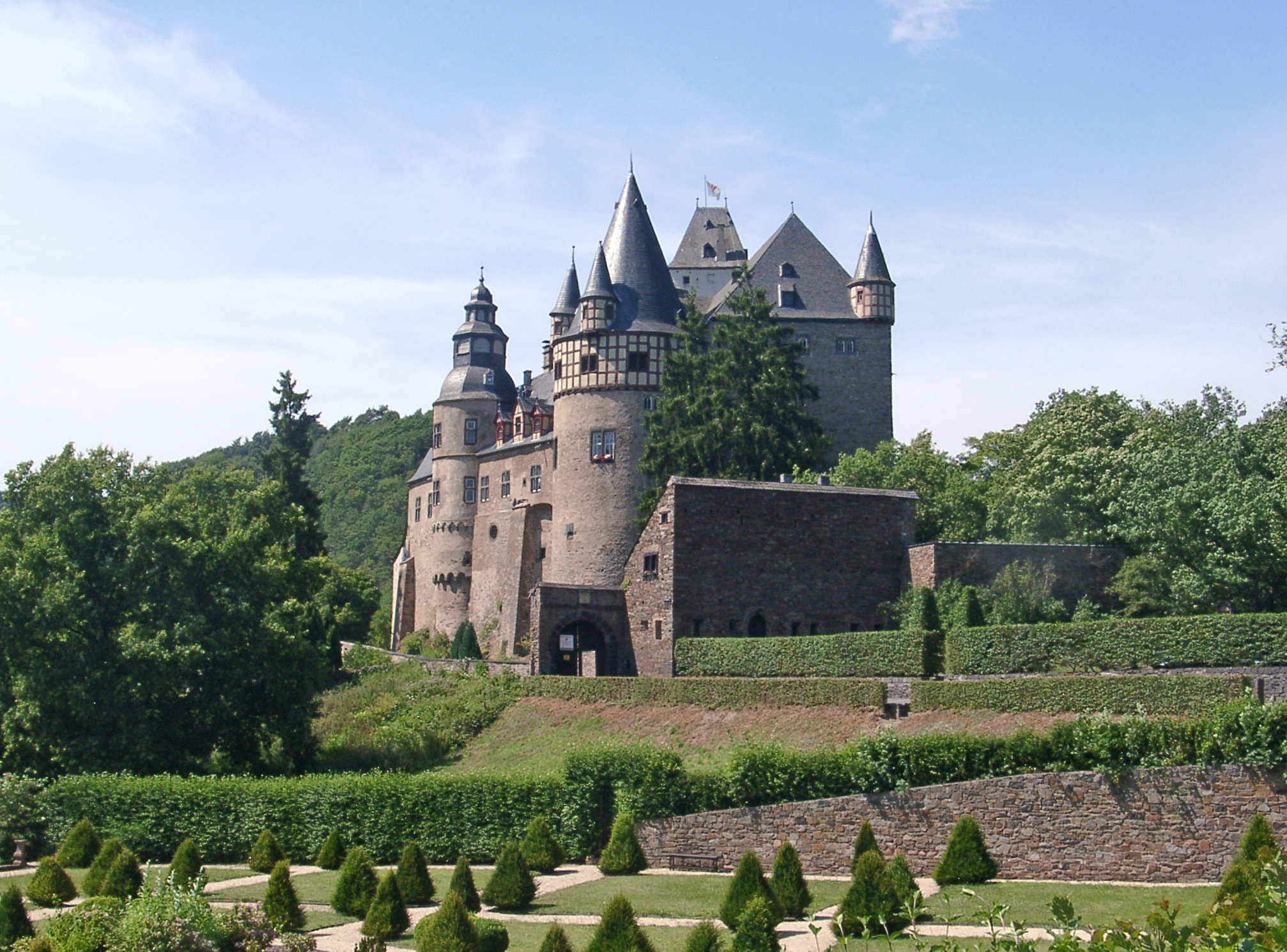
- Bürresheim Castle

- Coat of arms

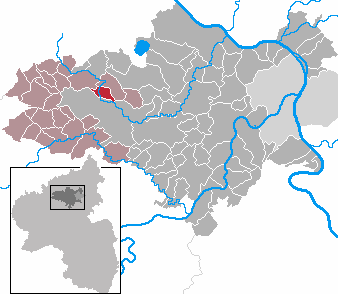
- Location of Sankt Johann within Mayen-Koblenz district
- Interactive map of Sankt Johann
- Location within Germany Location within Rhineland-Palatinate
- Coordinates: 50°21′00″N 7°11′45″E
- Country: Germany
- State: Rhineland-Palatinate
- District: Mayen-Koblenz
- Municipal assoc.: Vordereifel

Government
  - Mayor (2019–24): Rainer Wollenweber (CDU)

Area
  - Total: 4.32 km^{2} (1.67 sq mi)
- Elevation: 400 m (1,300 ft)

Population (2025-12-31)
  - Total: 946
  - Density: 219/km^{2} (567/sq mi)
- Time zone: UTC+01:00 (CET)
  - Summer (DST): UTC+02:00 (CEST)
- Postal codes: 56727
- Dialling codes: 02651
- Vehicle registration: MYK

Sankt Johann (German pronunciation: [zaŋkt ˈjoːhan]) is a municipality in the district of Mayen-Koblenz in Rhineland-Palatinate, western Germany.

== See also ==
- Sankt Johann
