= Nanc-lès-Saint-Amour =

- Part of Les Trois-Châteaux
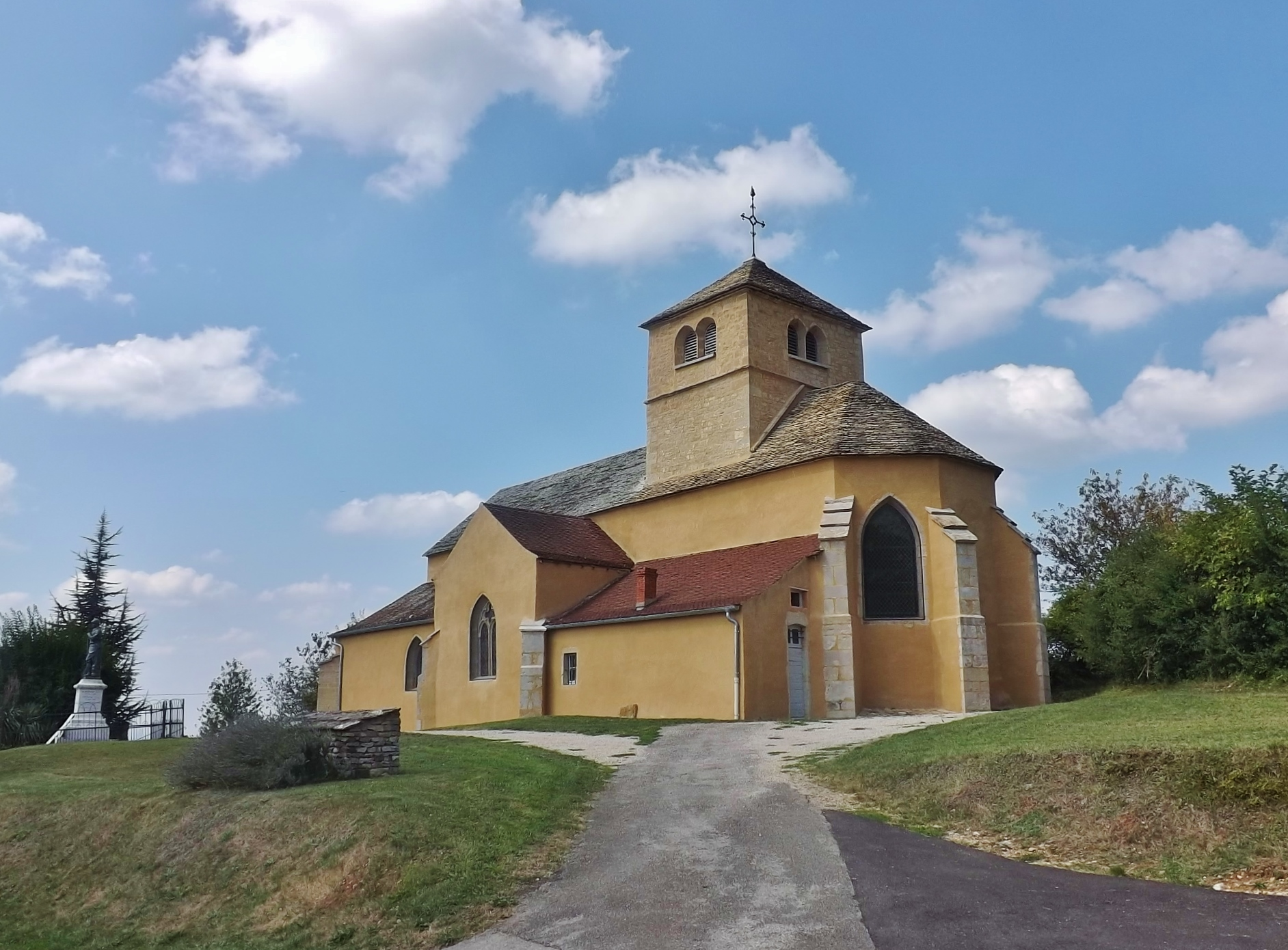
- Location of Nanc-lès-Saint-Amour
- Location within France Location within Bourgogne-Franche-Comté
- Coordinates: 46°25′25″N 5°21′34″E
- Country: France
- Region: Bourgogne-Franche-Comté
- Department: Jura
- Arrondissement: Lons-le-Saunier
- Canton: Saint-Amour
- Commune: Les Trois-Châteaux
- Area^{1}: 5.29 km^{2} (2.04 sq mi)
- Highest elevation: 596 m (1,955 ft)
- Lowest elevation: 209 m (686 ft)
- Population (2018): 296
  - Density: 56.0/km^{2} (145/sq mi)
- Time zone: UTC+01:00 (CET)
  - Summer (DST): UTC+02:00 (CEST)
- Postal code: 39160
- ^{1} French Land Register data, which excludes lakes, ponds, glaciers > 1 km^{2} (0.386 sq mi or 247 acres) and river estuaries.

Nanc-lès-Saint-Amour (French pronunciation: [nɑ̃ lɛ sɛ̃.t‿amuʁ], literally Nanc near Saint-Amour) is a former commune in the Jura department in Bourgogne-Franche-Comté in eastern France. On 1 April 2016, it was merged into the new commune of Les Trois-Châteaux.

== See also ==
- Communes of the Jura department
