= San Giovanni Battista =

San Giovanni Battista is the Italian translation of Saint John the Baptist.

San Giovanni Battista may also refer to:

== Churches in Italy ==
- San Giovanni Battista, Highway A11, in Florence
- San Giovanni Battista, Erice
- San Giovanni Battista, Praiano
- San Giovanni Battista, Ravenna
- San Giovanni Battista, Serravalle, in Vittorio Veneto
- Turin Cathedral

== Other uses ==
- San Giovanni Battista, an oratorio by Alessandro Stradella

== See also ==
- Giovanni Battista
- San Giovanni (disambiguation)
