= Chazelles, Jura =

Chazelles
- Part of Les Trois-Châteaux
- Location of Chazelles
- Location within France Location within Bourgogne-Franche-Comté
- Coordinates: 46°24′18″N 5°20′35″E
- Country: France
- Region: Bourgogne-Franche-Comté
- Department: Jura
- Arrondissement: Lons-le-Saunier
- Canton: Saint-Amour
- Commune: Les Trois-Châteaux
- Area^{1}: 4.04 km^{2} (1.56 sq mi)
- Highest elevation: 302 m (991 ft)
- Lowest elevation: 199 m (653 ft)
- Population (2018): 160
  - Density: 40/km^{2} (100/sq mi)
- Time zone: UTC+01:00 (CET)
  - Summer (DST): UTC+02:00 (CEST)
- Postal code: 39160
- ^{1} French Land Register data, which excludes lakes, ponds, glaciers > 1 km^{2} (0.386 sq mi or 247 acres) and river estuaries.

Chazelles (French pronunciation: [ʃazɛl]) is a former commune in the Jura department in Bourgogne-Franche-Comté in eastern France. On 1 April 2016, it was merged into the new commune of Les Trois-Châteaux.

== See also ==
- Communes of the Jura department
