= Giovani (footballer, born 1989) =

Brazilian footballer

Personal information
- Full name: Giovani Luiz Neitzke
- Date of birth: 28 February 1989 (age 37)
- Place of birth: Brazil
- Height: 1.93 m (6 ft 4 in)
- Position: Goalkeeper

Youth career
- 1999–2003: Grêmio
- 2004–2006: SER Caxias

Senior career*
Years	Team	Apps	(Gls)
2007	Grêmio		
2007	Cerezo Osaka		
- * Club domestic league appearances and goals

Giovani Luiz Neitzke or simply Giovani (born 28 February 1989) is a Brazilian former footballer who played as a goalkeeper. His brother André Luís Neitzke is also footballer.

== Career ==
Giovani came through the youth team at Grêmio and SER Caxias. He joined top team of Grêmio in 2007. In September, he moved to J2 League club, Cerezo Osaka. His brother André Luís Neitzke also played for the club in 2006.
