= Sant Joan (disambiguation) =

Sant Joan (Catalan for St John) is a village and municipality on Majorca in Spain.

Sant Joan may also refer to:

== Places in Spain ==
- Sant Joan de les Abadesses, Ripollès, Catalonia
- Sant Joan Despí, Baix Llobregat, Catalonia
- Sant Joan d'Alacant, Alicante, Valencia
- Sant Joan de Labritja, Ibiza
- Sant Joan de l'Ènova, Ribera Alta, Valencia
- Sant Joan de l'Erm, a ski resort in Alt Urgell, Catalonia
- Sant Joan de Mollet, Gironès, Catalonia
- Sant Joan de Vilatorrada, Bages, Catalonia
- Sant Joan les Fonts, Garrotxa, Catalonia

== Churches ==
- Sant Joan de Boí, in Boí, Catalonia
- Sant Joan de Caselles, Andorra
- Sant Joan de Foixà, in Foixà, Catalonia
- Església de Sant Joan de Sispony, Andorra

== Other places ==
- Son Sant Joan Airport, Palma de Mallorca
- Funicular de Sant Joan, a railway in Montserrat, Catalonia
- Passeig de Sant Joan, Barcelona, a major street

== Festivals ==
- Sant Joan or Bonfires of Saint John, a festival that takes place on the evening of 23 June

== See also ==
- Saint-Jean (disambiguation)
- Saint Joan (disambiguation)
- Saint John (disambiguation)
- Saint Juan (disambiguation)
- San Juan (disambiguation)
- São João (disambiguation)
- Joan (disambiguation)
