= Church of San Giovanni Battista =

Church of San Giovanni Battista (Italian: Chiesa di San Giovanni Battista) may refer to:

- San Giovanni Battista, Praiano, Italy
- Church of San Giovanni Battista, Mogno, Switzerland
