= Saint-Jean-d'Étreux =

- Part of Les Trois-Châteaux
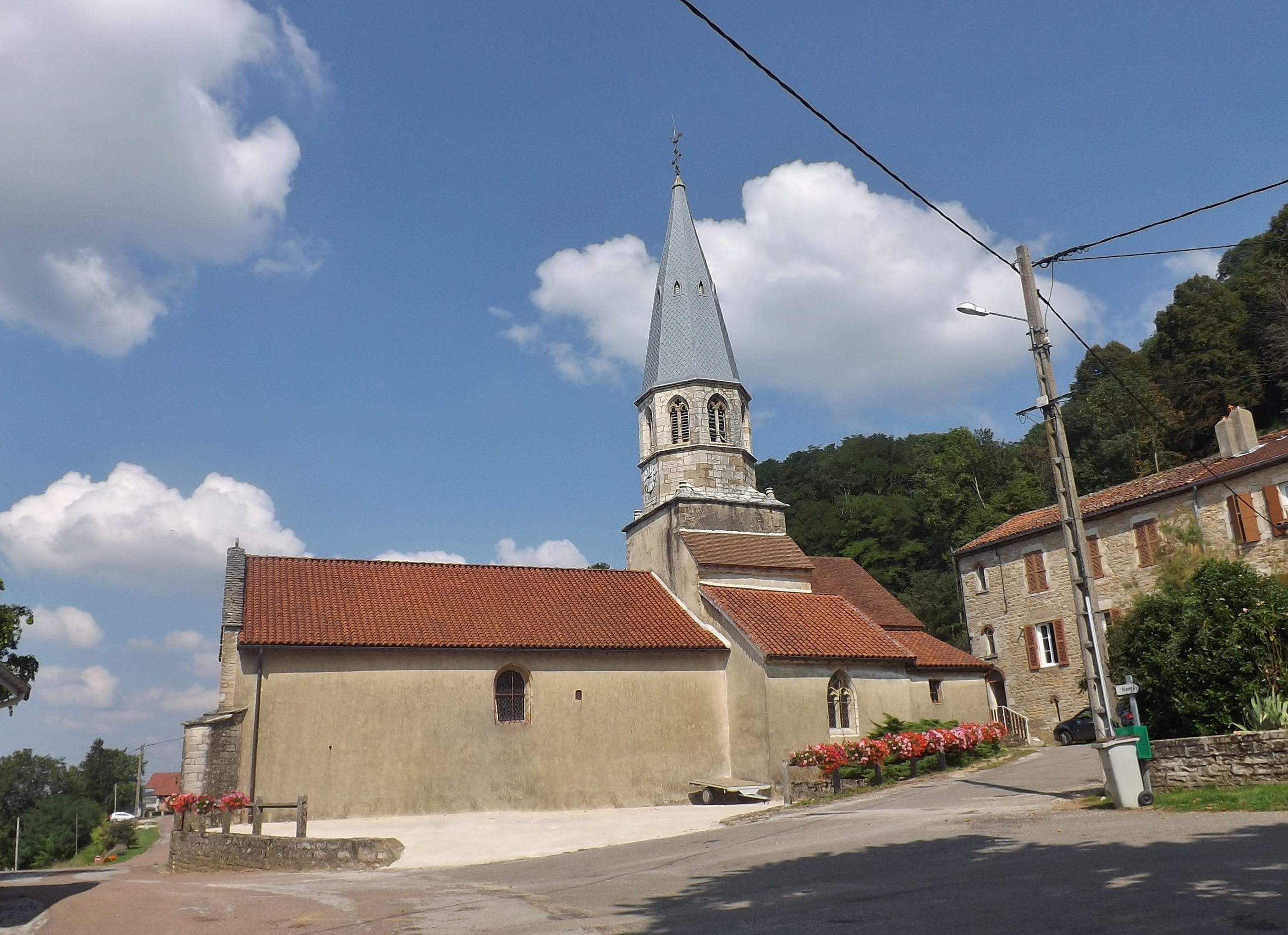
- Location of Saint-Jean-d'Étreux
- Location within France Location within Bourgogne-Franche-Comté
- Coordinates: 46°24′20″N 5°21′31″E
- Country: France
- Region: Bourgogne-Franche-Comté
- Department: Jura
- Arrondissement: Lons-le-Saunier
- Canton: Saint-Amour
- Commune: Les Trois-Châteaux
- Area^{1}: 4.28 km^{2} (1.65 sq mi)
- Highest elevation: 600 m (2,000 ft)
- Lowest elevation: 290 m (950 ft)
- Population (2018): 147
  - Density: 34.3/km^{2} (89.0/sq mi)
- Time zone: UTC+01:00 (CET)
  - Summer (DST): UTC+02:00 (CEST)
- Postal code: 39160
- ^{1} French Land Register data, which excludes lakes, ponds, glaciers > 1 km^{2} (0.386 sq mi or 247 acres) and river estuaries.

Saint-Jean-d'Étreux (French pronunciation: [sɛ̃ ʒɑ̃ detʁø]) is a former commune in the Jura department in the Bourgogne-Franche-Comté region in eastern France. On 1 January 2019, it was merged into the commune Les Trois-Châteaux.

== See also ==
- Communes of the Jura department
