= Saint-Jean-de-la-Léqueraye =

- Part of Le Mesnil-Saint-Jean
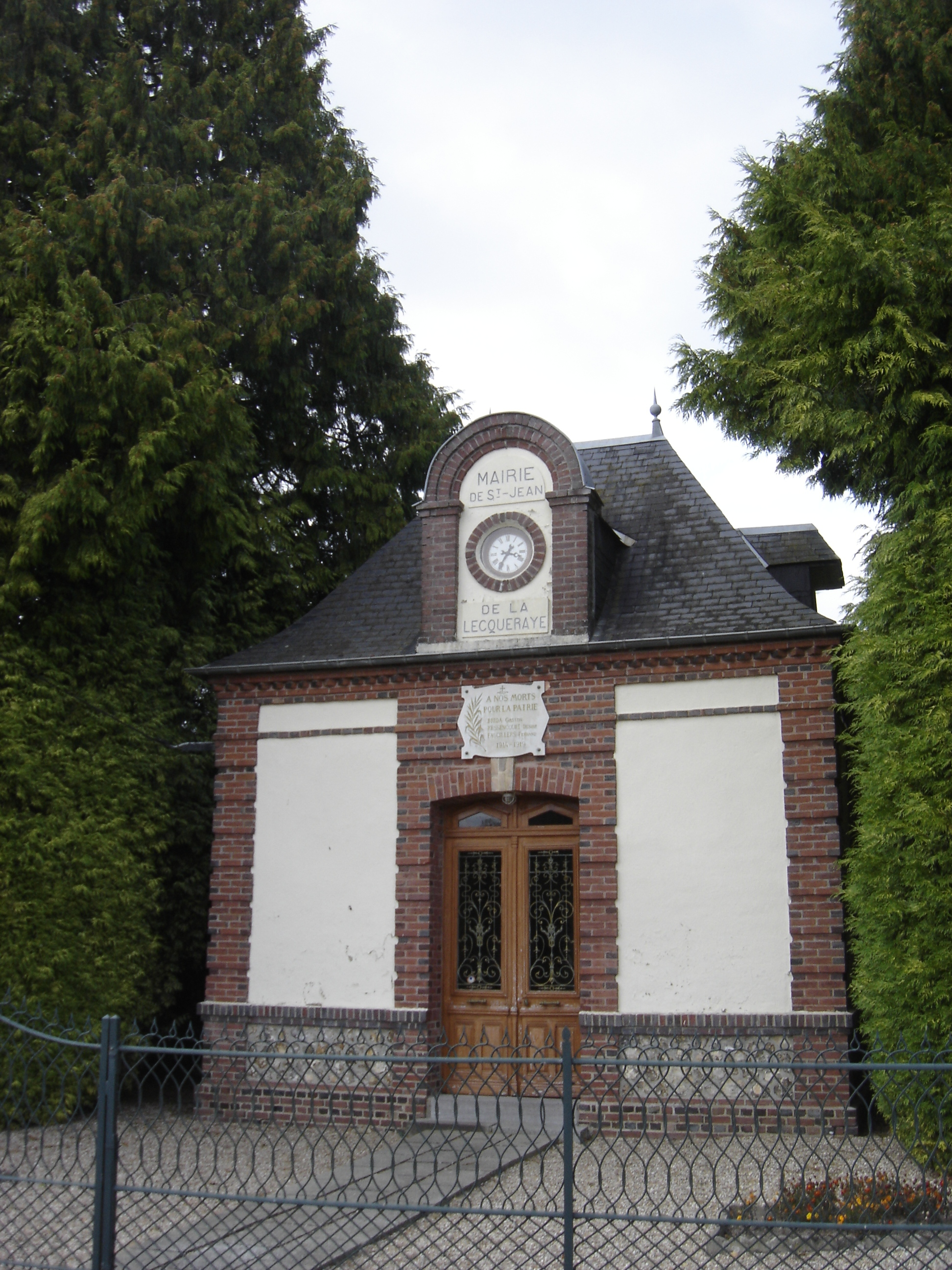
- Town hall
- Location of Saint-Jean-de-la-Léqueraye
- Location within France Location within Normandy
- Coordinates: 49°13′29″N 0°33′49″E
- Country: France
- Region: Normandy
- Department: Eure
- Arrondissement: Bernay
- Canton: Beuzeville
- Commune: Le Mesnil-Saint-Jean
- Area^{1}: 4.67 km^{2} (1.80 sq mi)
- Elevation: 168 m (551 ft)
- Highest elevation: 165 m (541 ft)
- Lowest elevation: 120 m (390 ft)
- Population (2019): 68
  - Density: 15/km^{2} (38/sq mi)
- Time zone: UTC+01:00 (CET)
  - Summer (DST): UTC+02:00 (CEST)
- Postal code: 27560
- ^{1} French Land Register data, which excludes lakes, ponds, glaciers > 1 km^{2} (0.386 sq mi or 247 acres) and river estuaries.

Saint-Jean-de-la-Léqueraye (French pronunciation: [sɛ̃ ʒɑ̃ də la lek(ə)ʁɛ]) is a former commune in the Eure department in Normandy in northern France. On 1 January 2019, it was merged into the new commune Le Mesnil-Saint-Jean.

== See also ==
- Communes of the Eure department
