= Giovanni (meteorology) =

Giovanni is a Web interface that allows users to analyze NASA's gridded data from various satellite and surface observations.

Giovanni lets researchers examine data on atmospheric chemistry, atmospheric temperature, water vapor and clouds, atmospheric aerosols, precipitation, and ocean chlorophyll and surface temperature. The primary data consist of global gridded data sets with reduced spatial resolution. Basic analytical functions performed by Giovanni are carried out by the Grid Analysis and Display System (GrADS).

Giovanni is an acronym for GES-DISC Interactive Online Visualization ANd aNalysis Infrastructure.

It allows access to data from multiple remote sites, supports multiple data formats including Hierarchical Data Format (HDF), HDF-EOS, network Common Data Form (netCDF), GRIdded Binary (GRIB), and binary, and multiple plot types including area, time, Hovmoller, and image animation.
