= Sant Joan, Foixà =

Coordinates: 42°2′23.068″N 2°59′48.48″E

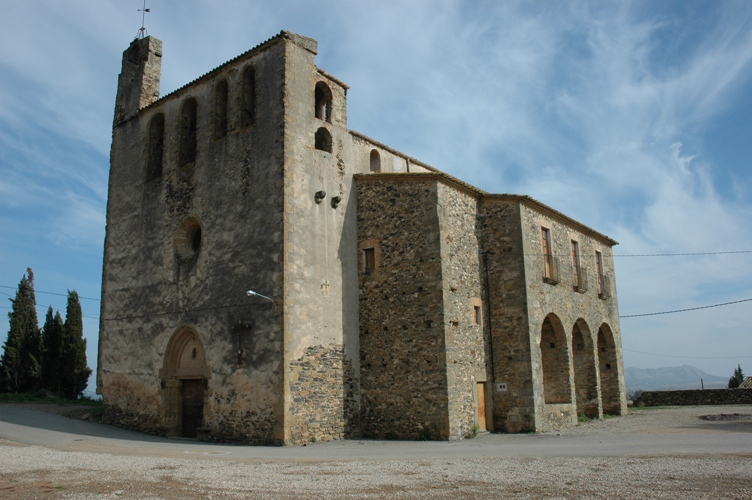
Sant Joan de Foixà.

Sant Joan de Foixà is a twelfth-century Romanesque church located in the municipality of Foixà, Spain.

== History ==
The church of Sant Joan de Foixà (Catalan for Saint John) was restored in 1058 by the countess Ermesinde of Barcelona to Berengar, bishop of Girona. This is the first document in which the church is mentioned by the name of Sancti Johannis Fusxano.

The current church dates mostly from the 16th century, however some vestiges of the church that existed in the mid 12th century still remain.

Most likely during the War of the Remences the church served as a fortress because in the upper left wall were two corbels which could have supported a machicolation.

Curiously, a car garage at the north end, constructed in 1958 for the priest, has recently been demolished.

== Architecture ==
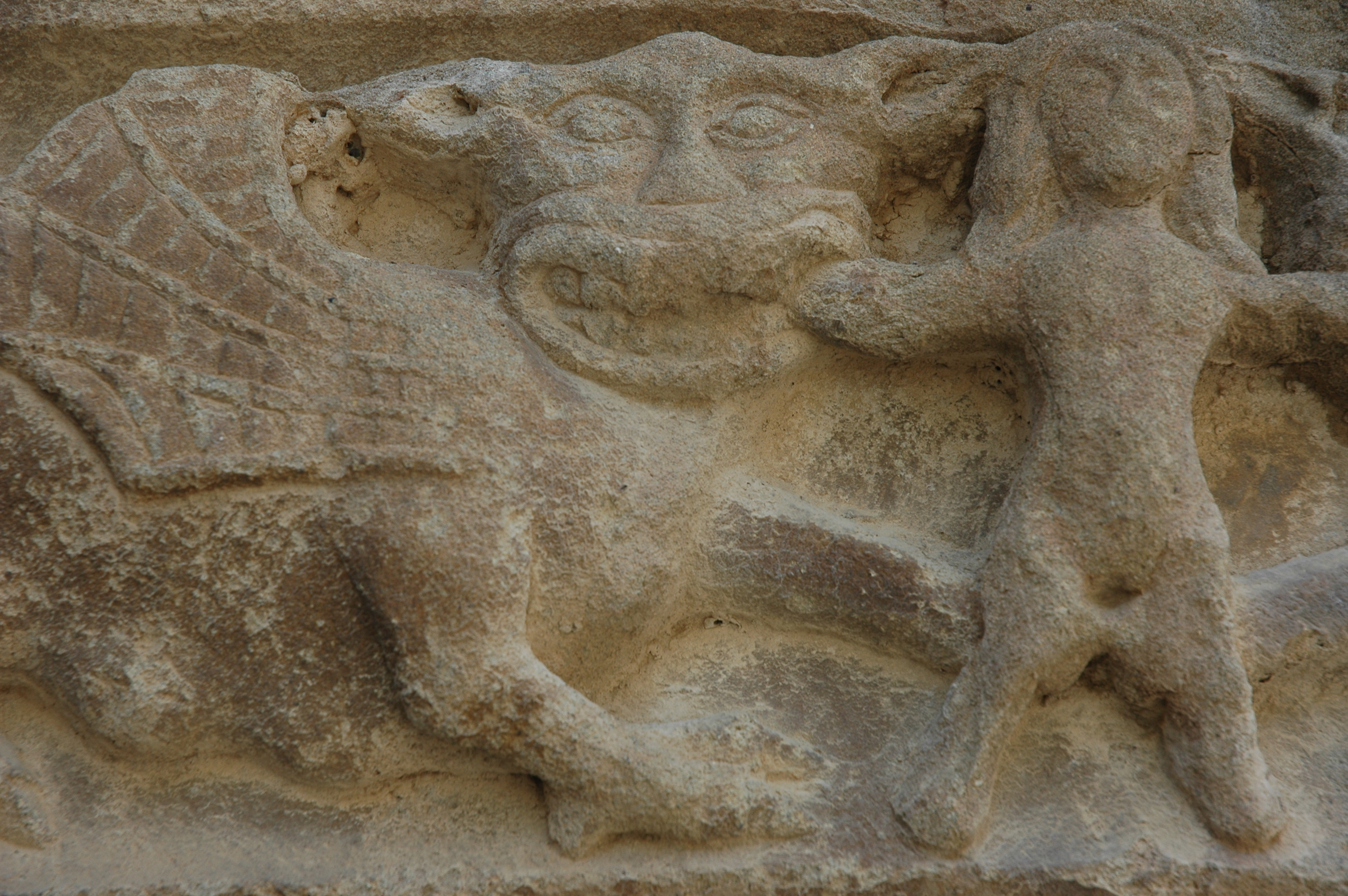
The devouring monsters.

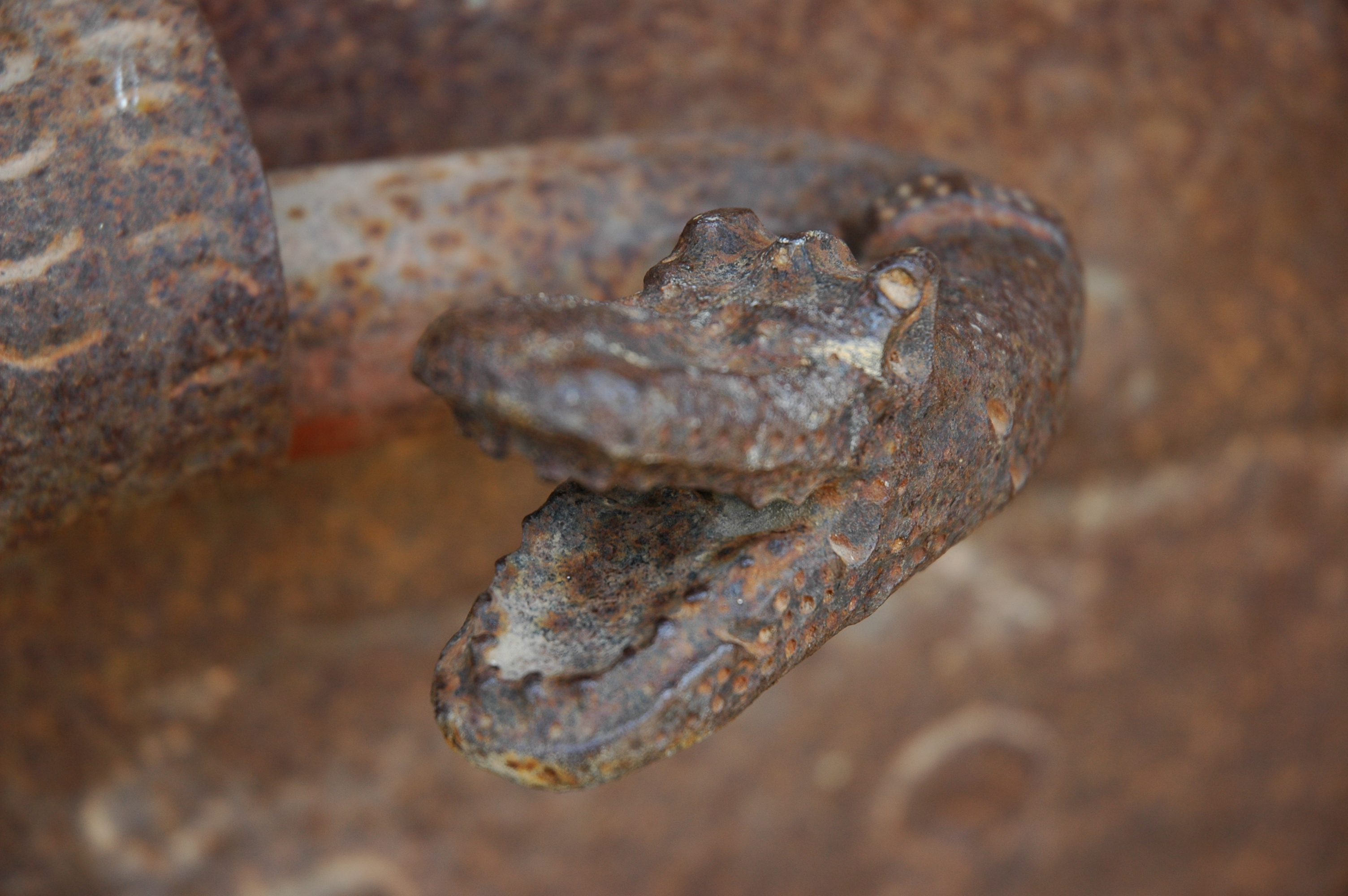
Snake-shaped lock.

The late Gothic church is complete with nave, semicircular apse and lateral chapels.

The entrance features a pointed frontispiece with four sloping archivolts supported by fluted columns with original capitals, a lintel and a pediment. The capital on the left features a floral pattern while the right, two devouring monsters, a type of winged lion that swallow a person whole. The lintel at the center features a small rhomboid emblem in bas-relief depicting tools of the trade of the master of the house.

In the leaf of the door the lock is in the shape of a snake, found in many churches in the country. The shape, rooted in the Romanesque period, lasted well until into the Baroque period.

The interior boasts adorned archways depicting fantastic animals, the comic and caricaturesque faces of people and floral ornaments, a remarkably popular decoration. At the center of the façade is a simple rose window. The flooring is tiled throughout.

In 1624 priest Andrew Madiona was interred inside the church. In the 18th century two members of two important families were also laid to rest there: Joan Perich and Tomas Torres.
