= Sankt Johann-Köppling =

- Former municipality
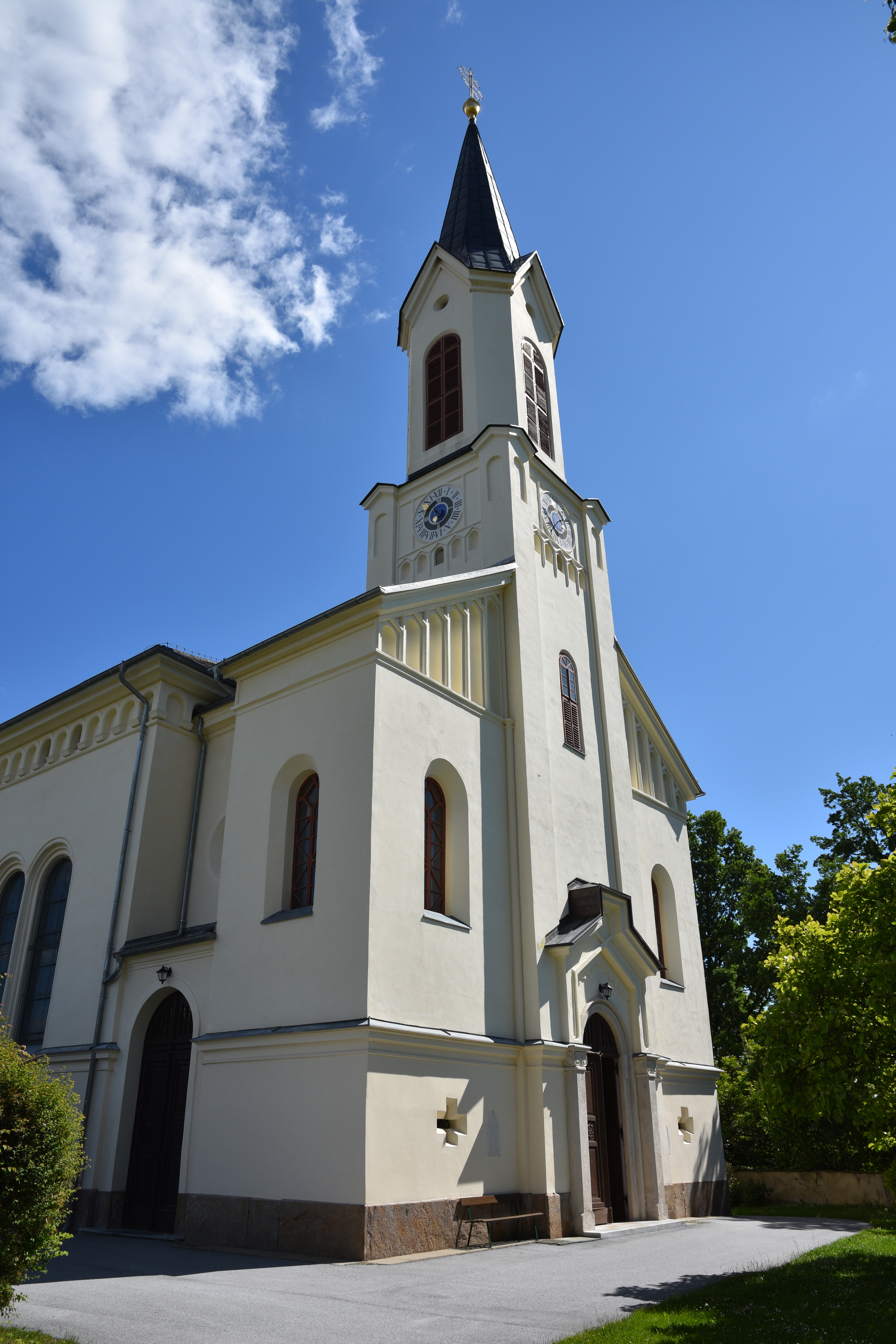
- Sankt Johann-Köppling parish church

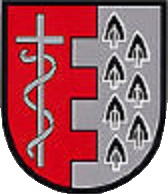
- Coat of arms

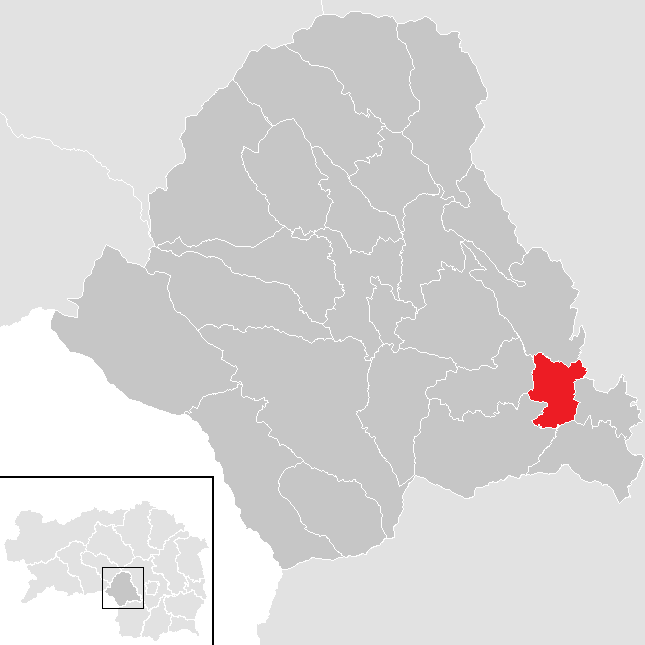
- Location within Voitsberg district

- Location within Austria
- Coordinates: 47°00′33″N 15°14′14″E
- Country: Austria
- State: Styria
- District: Voitsberg

Area
  - Total: 10.17 km^{2} (3.93 sq mi)
- Elevation: 350–480 m (1,150–1,570 ft)

Population (1 January 2016)
  - Total: 1,795
  - Density: 176.5/km^{2} (457.1/sq mi)
- Time zone: UTC+1 (CET)
  - Summer (DST): UTC+2 (CEST)
- Postal code: 8565
- Area code: 03143
- Vehicle registration: VO
- Website: www.st-johann-koeppling.at

Sankt Johann-Köppling is a former municipality in the district of Voitsberg in the Austrian state of Styria. Since the 2015 Styria municipal structural reform, it is part of the municipality Söding-Sankt Johann.

== Geography ==
The municipality lies southwest of Graz.
