= List of monastic houses in Gloucestershire =

Locations of monastic houses in Gloucestershire
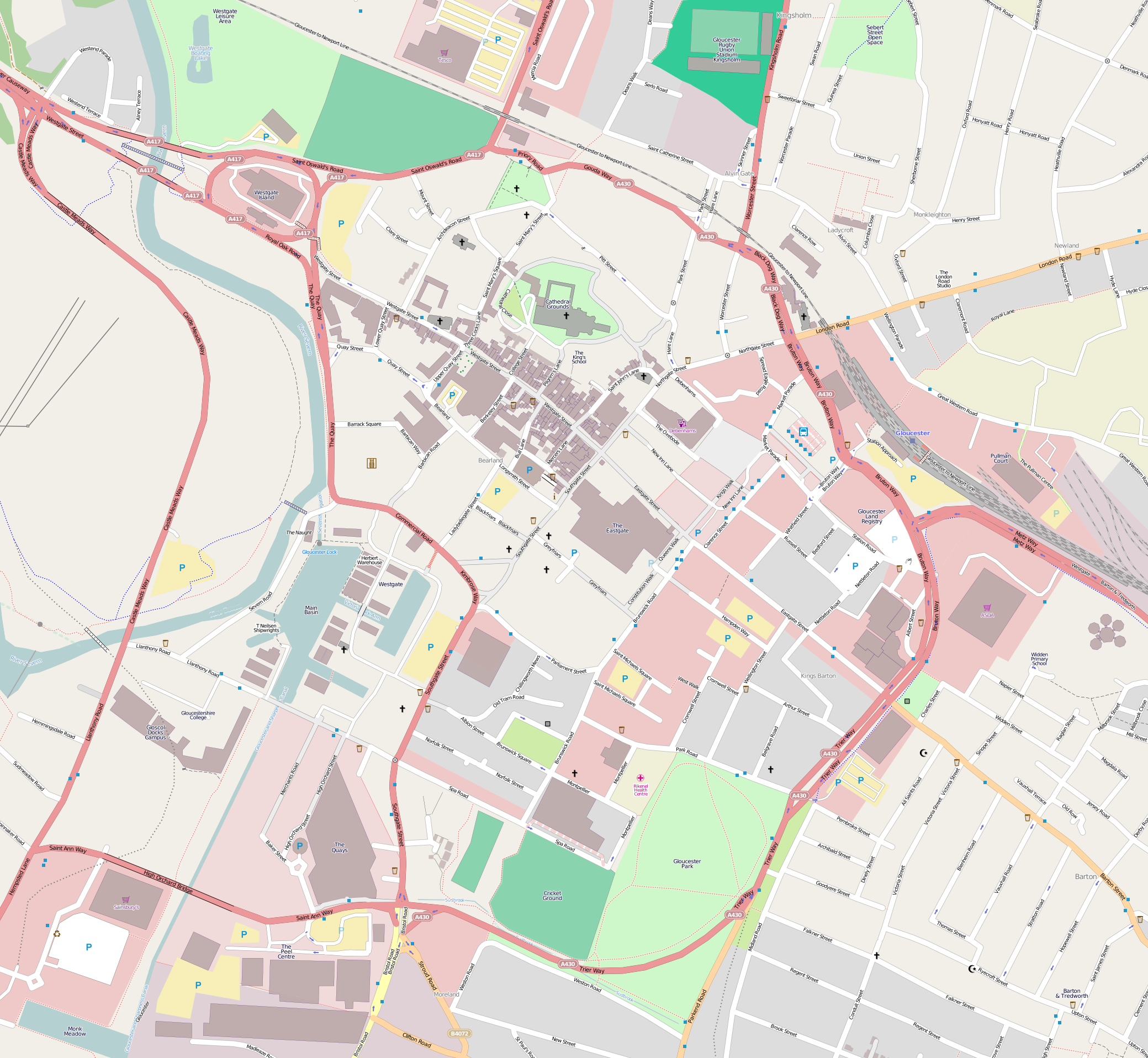
Locations of monastic houses in Gloucester

The following is a list of the monastic houses in Gloucestershire, England.

Alien houses are included, as are smaller establishments such as cells and notable monastic granges (particularly those with resident monks), and also camerae of the military orders of monks (Knights Templar and Knights Hospitaller). Monastic hospitals are included where they had the status or function of an abbey, priory, or preceptor/commandery.

Abbreviations and key

Status of remains
Symbol	Status
None	Ruins
*	Current monastic function
^{+}	Current non-monastic ecclesiastic function (including remains incorporated into later structure)
^	Current non-ecclesiastic function (including remains incorporated into later structure) or redundant intact structure
^{$}	Remains limited to earthworks etc.
^{#}	No identifiable trace of the monastic foundation remains
^{~}	Exact site of monastic foundation unknown
^{≈}	Identification ambiguous or confused

Locations with names in italics indicate possible duplication (misidentification with another location) or non-existent foundations (either erroneous reference or proposed foundation never implemented) or ecclesiastical establishments with a monastic name but lacking actual monastic connection.

Trusteeship
EH	English Heritage
LT	Landmark Trust
NT	National Trust

Foundation	Image	Communities & provenance	Formal name or dedication & alternative names	References & location
Beckford Priory	Historical county location. See entry under List of monastic houses in Worcestershire			
Berkeley Abbey		nuns founded before 807; destroyed before 1051 secular collegiate founded before 1066 (1019–1053) by Earl Godwin; dissolved c.1135 or later (after 1338); granted to Reading, Berkshire; current parochial church of St Mary possibly on site of minster or a property of the minster	Berkeley Minster ____________________ possibly Oldminster	51°42′57″N 2°28′29″W
Bishop's Cleeve		minster and church of St Michael granted by Offa and Ealdred 768–79; apparently annexed to the bishop or church of Worcester before 888		
Blockley Monastery		Saxon monastery founded before?855; granted to Ealhun, Bishop of Worcester by Burhred, King of Mercia 855		
Boxwell Priory		Benedictine nuns possibly destroyed in raids by the Danes (Note: Boxwell Priory — destruction: J. Leland, Itinerary, iv, p.133; W. Dugdale; Monasticon Anglicanum)		
Brimpsfield Priory		Benedictine monks founded before 1100; alien house: (non-conventual: grange?), dependent on St Wandrille, Fontenay; dissolved 1414 (before 1441); granted to Eton College, then to Windsor	Brimpsfield Grange	51°48′52″N 2°05′10″W
Cheltenham Minster		Anglo-Saxon minster here from 8th century onwards which was a monasterium or collegiate church as opposed to a monastery. Not to be confused with the more recent Cheltenham Minster, where St Mary's Parish Church was redesignated a Minster by the Bishop of Gloucester on Sunday 3 February 2013. Reference to minster 803 founded before 803 (c.770: apparently extant for 30 years); absorbed by Worcester ? before 890		51°53′47″N 2°04′26″W
Cirencester Abbey		Saxon minster — secular college founded before 839 (during the reign of Egbert, King of Wessex) by Alwin; Augustinian Canons Regular founded (1117 (Note: Cirencester: building commenced)-) 1131 (Note: Cirencester: first abbot of consecrated) by Henry I; dissolved 19 December 1539; granted to Sir Thomas Seymour 1547; granted to Richard Masters 1563/4; site now within a public park; house named 'Abbey House' built on site	The Blessed Virgin Mary	51°43′08″N 1°58′10″W
Daylesford Monastery		founded 718 (? 727) by Begia (Baegia), land granted by Æthelbald, King of Mercia; granted to Worcester by Beorhtwulf 841; later claimed by Evesham dissolved	Daeglesford Priory	51°55′48″N 1°38′55″W (approx)
Deerhurst Abbey ^{+}		Saxon minster founded late-7th century; Benedictine? monks founded after 715 purportedly by Dodo (co-founder of Tewkesbury); destroyed? c.878; Benedictine monks rebuilt/(re)founded c.970 by St Oswald; destroyed c.975; alien house: dependent on St-Denis rebuilt before 1056, purportedly by Edward the Confessor, who granted it to St-Denis c.1059 — alien priory; became denizen: independent from 1443; granted to Eton College c.1447; restored to St Denis, for English monks 1461; secular chaplain without monks 1467; granted as cell to Tewkesbury; dissolved 1540; conventual church in parochial use as the Parish Church of St Mary	St Mary the Virgin St Mary the Virgin and St Denis ____________________; Derehures Abbey	51°58′05″N 2°11′24″W
Farmcote Grange		Cistercian monks grange of Hailes Abbey		51°57′36″N 1°54′46″W & 51°57′35″N 1°54′43″W
Flaxley Abbey ^{+}		Cistercian monks daughter house of Bordesley, Worcestershire founded 30 September 1151 by Roger, Earl of Hereford; dissolved 1536–7; granted to Sir Anthony Kingston 1544/5; remains now incorporated into a private house without public access	The Blessed Virgin Mary ____________________; Flexley Abbey; Dene Abbey	51°50′10″N 2°27′07″W
Gloucester Blackfriars		Dominican Friars (under the Visitation of Oxford) founded 1239 (before 1241) by Sir Stephen de Hermshall (or by Henry III) and consecrated 1284; dissolved 1538; granted to Thomas Bell 1539/40, who made it a drapering house		51°51′51″N 2°14′55″W
Gloucester Greyfriars		Franciscan Friars Minor, Conventual (under the Custody of Bristol) founded before 1230 (1231), granted by Lord Berkley, under the guidance of Agnellus of Pisa, with timber provided by Henry III; dissolved 1538; granted to John Jennings 1543/4; church converted into a brewery		51°51′49″N 2°14′47″W
Gloucester Whitefriars ^{#}		Carmelite Friars founded before 1268 (during the reign of Henry III) purportedly by Queen Eleanor, Sir Thomas Gifford and Sir Thomas Berkley; dissolved c.25 July 1538; granted to Richard Andrews and Nicholas Temple 1543/4		51°51′56″N 2°14′23″W
Gloucester Cathedral Abbey ^{+}		Benedictine monks and nuns — double house founded before 679 (c.681) by Wulfhere, King of Mercia and his brother and successor Æthelred; destroyed in raids by the Danes after 767; secular canons minster founded before 823 (c.823-5); Benedictine monks founded c1022; Benedictine monks refounded c.1058; dissolved 2 January 1540; granted to the Bishop and officers of Gloucester; conventual church becoming an episcopal diocesan cathedral founded 1541; extant	The Abbey Church of Saint Peter, Gloucester The Cathedral Church of Saint Peter and the Holy and Indivisible Trinity in Gloucester (1541)	51°52′03″N 2°14′48″W
St Oswald's Priory, Gloucester		church of secular canons traditionally founded 660 by a son of Penda of Mercia; Augustinian Canons Regular founded 890s/refounded 909 by Æthelflæd/Æthelflæda and her husband Æthelred, ealdorman of Mercia; founded before 1153 as a priory by Henry Murdac, Archbishop of York; granted to John Jennings 1539/40; subsequently in parochial use as the Parish Church of St Catherine; destroyed 1643	St Oswald, King and Martyr	51°52′09″N 2°14′52″W
Hailes Abbey		Cistercian monks — from Beaulieu, Hampshire founded 17 July 1246 (1245) by Richard, Earl of Cornwall; dissolved 24 December 1539; granted to Sir Thomas Seymour 1547; granted to William, Marquis of Northampton 1550; (NT)	The Blessed Virgin Mary ____________________; Hayles Abbey; Tray Abbey	51°58′06″N 1°55′41″W
Hatherop Priory		Carthusian Monks founded 1222 transferred to Hinton 1227–32		
Hazleton Abbey		Cistercian monks daughter house of Tintern, Monmouthshire; (community founded at Kingswood earlier site 7 September 1139); transferred from Kingswood c.1149-50; dissolved c.1150-4; transferred to Tetbury; (EH)	The Blessed Virgin Mary	51°41′02″N 2°06′14″W
Horsley Priory ^		Benedictine monks alien house: cell dependent on Troarn; founded between 1066 and 1087 (during the reign of William the Conqueror) by Roger, Earl of Shrewsbury; Augustinian Canons Regular became denizen: cell granted to Bruton 1260; vicarage 1380; dissolved; granted to Sir Walter Denys of Dyrham 1553; a prison late-18th century; 19th century parish church of St Mary now occupies the site or an area to the north; other monastic buildings possibly currently in use as a hotel	dedication unknown ____________________; Horkeslegh Priory	51°40′50″N 2°14′09″W
Kingswood Abbey, earlier site		Cistercian Monks — from Tintern, Monmouthshire daughter house of Tintern; founded 7 September 1139 by William de Berkeley; refounded 1164-70 on new site; transferred to Hazleton 1149–50; this site retained as a grange; dissolved 1 February 1538 and demolished; gatehouse remains; (EH)	Kingswood Grange	51°36′53″N 2°22′27″W or 51°37′39″N 2°22′22″W (possible)
Kingswood Abbey		Cistercian Monks — from Tintern, Monmouthshire (community founded at Kingswood earlier site 7 September 1139); transferred from Tetbury c.1164-70; dissolved 1 February 1538		51°37′36″N 2°22′00″W
Kinley Priory		purportedly an ancient priory, lands seized by William the Conqueror (Note: Kinley — W. Dugdale, Monasticon Anglicanum)	Kinline Priory	
Lechlade Priory		Augustinian Canons Regular founded 13th century by Richard, Earl of Cornwall	The Priory Church of Saint John the Baptist, Lechlade ____________________; Lechelade Priory	51°41′31″N 1°41′36″W (approx)
Leonard Stanley Priory ^{+}		Benedictine monks founded c.1130 by Roger de Berkeley II; Augustinian Canons Regular confirmed to Gloucester Abbey 1146; dissolved 1538; granted to Sir Anthony Kingston church now in parochial use	The Priory Church of Saint Leonard of Stanley ____________________; Stanley St Leonard Priory; Stanley Priory	51°43′38″N 2°17′17″W
Llanthony Secunda Priory		Augustinian Canons Regular — from Llanthony, Wales daughter house of Llanthony founded 1136 at the instance of Robert, Bishop of Gloucester on a site granted by Miles (Milo) of Gloucester, Earl of Hereford; built by the prior and canons at Llanthony Priory; dissolved 1538; granted to Sir Arthur Porter 1540/1	The Priory Church of the Blessed Virgin Mary; Lantony Priory; Lanthony Priory	51°51′38″N 2°15′25″W
Minchinhampton Priory		Benedictine nuns alien house: dependent on Holy Trinity, Caen; probably a grange: no evidence of nuns resident; granted to the nuns (or minchins) of Holy Trinity, Caen 1082 by William the Conqueror; leased before 1192; forfeit 14th century; reverted to the Crown 1414; granted to Syon Abbey 1424; granted to Andrews, Lord Windsor 1542/3;	Minchin Hampton Priory	51°42′21″N 2°11′17″W
Minsterworth		Saxon minster		
Newent Priory		Benedictine monks alien house: dependent on Cormeilles Priory, Normandy; founded before 1086 by William fitz Osbern; dissolved 1411 by Henry IV; granted to Fotheringay College; granted to Sir Richard Lee 1547; St Mary's Parish church possibly the Priory Church	The Blessed Virgin Mary ____________________; Noent Priory; Newenton Priory	51°55′53″N 2°24′15″W
Poulton Priory		chantry chapel founded 1348 by Sir Thomas Seymour; Gilbertine Canons founded 1350; dissolved 1539; conventual church becoming the parish church demolished and replaced 1873; monastic remains incorporated into a wall at Priory Farm on site	The Priory Church of Saint Mary, Poulton	51°41′56″N 1°51′50″W
Prinknash Abbey *		Benedictine monks founded 1928 at St Peter's Grange; transferred to new abbey 1972 (see immediately below); transferred back to St Peter's Grange 29 June 2008; extant		51°49′03″N 2°10′40″W
Prinknash Abbey — former site		Benedictine monks (community founded 1928 at St Peter's Grange); transferred here 1972; transferred back to St Peter's Grange 29 June 2008 (see immediately above)		51°49′21″N 2°10′34″W
Quenington Preceptory		Knights Hospitaller founded between 1144 and 1162 by Walter, the first Prior of the Order in England by the bounty of Agnes de Lacy and her daughter; dissolved 1540; granted to Sir Richard Morisine and Sir Anthony Kingston 1545/6; demolished 17th century; site now occupied by Quenington House	Queinington Preceptory	51°44′03″N 1°47′13″W
St Briavels Chantry		hermitage Cistercian monks chantry dependent on Grace Dieu; founded c.1361, granted to Grace Dieu (Note: St Briavels — W. Dugdale; Monasticon Anglicanum); dissolution unknown		
Temple Guiting Preceptory		Knights Templar founded c.1150, lands granted by Gilbert de Lacy and Roger de Waterville; benefactors included Roger, Earl of Hereford, and Roger d'Oilly; dissolved 1308–1311; possibly in ownership of Knights Hospitallers after 1338, but neither used as preceptory or camera	Guiting Preceptory	51°56′29″N 1°52′14″W
Temple Guiting Grange		possible Knights Templars grange of Temple Guiting Preceptory		51°56′06″N 1°48′58″W
Tetbury Monastery		Saxon monastery founded before 680; land granted by King Æthelred of Mercia; site possibly near current after-medieval parish church of St Mary Magdalene (built on the site of a medieval church)	Tettan Monastery	51°38′09″N 2°09′37″W
Tetbury Abbey		Cistercian monks (community founded at Kingswood earlier site 7 September 1139); transferred from Hazleton c.1150-4 (1148–54); site found to be unsuitable; transferred to Kingswood c.1164-70; monastic remains apparently incorporated into current residences in Tetbury	The Blessed Virgin Mary	51°38′08″N 2°09′37″W
Tewkesbury Abbey ^{+}		hermitage of Theokus; Benedictine? monks cell dependent on Cranborne; founded c.715 by Dodo, Saxon lord; destroyed? in raids by the Danes 9th century; cell refounded c.980; enlarged by Robert RitzHaimon 1102; transferred from Cranborne 1102; raised to abbey status 1102; dissolved 9 January 1540; granted to Thomas Strowde, Walter Erie and James Paget 1544/5; now in parochial use	The Abbey Church of the Blessed Virgin Mary, Tewkesbury ____________________; Theokesbury Abbey	51°59′25″N 2°09′38″W
Twyinging Monastery		Saxon monastery founded before c.770 (during(?) the tenure of Mildred, Bishop of Worcester); granted to Worcester c.800 or 814	Bituinaeum Monastery; Ad Tuueoneaam	
Winchcombe Nunnery		nuns founded 787 by Offa; Benedictine foundation built on site (see immediately below)		51°57′11″N 1°58′00″W
Winchcombe Abbey		Benedictine monks founded 798 by King Ranulph on site of a nunnery (see immediately above); secular founded 9th century?; raised to abbey status c.969; destroyed by fire 1151; rebuilt and rededicated 1239; dissolved 1540; granted to Sir Thomas Seymour 1547/8; abbot's house used as parish workhouse; demolished 1815	The Abbey Church of St Mary and St Kenelm, Winchcombe ____________________; Winchcombe Priory; Winchelcombe Abbey	51°57′11″N 1°58′00″W
Withington Monastery		Saxon monastery founded between 674 and 704?: site granted to Abbess Dunna and her daughter Bucga for monastery by viceroy Oshere, with the consent of King Æthelred of Mercia dissolved after early-9th century		
Woodchester Monastery		religious house purportedly built by Gueta, wife of Earl Godwin (Note: Woodchester Monastery — T. Tanner, Notitia Monastica, p.145, citing W. Camden, Britannia, (1695), p.247)		
Wotton under Edge Friary		Crutched Friars founded 1349(?) (1347): licence for foundation granted by Edward III 1349; dissolution unknown, probably after only a few years		51°38′17″N 2°21′09″W
Yate Monastery		Saxon monastery founded 777-9?: land granted to St Mary's, Worcester between 777 and 779; dissolved after early-9th century; absorbed by Worcester c.888? (Note: Yate Monastery — Victoria County History Volume 2, p.2 and note n.)		

== See also ==
- List of monastic houses in England
- List of monastic houses in Wales
