= List of monastic houses in Herefordshire =

Locations of monastic houses in Herefordshire
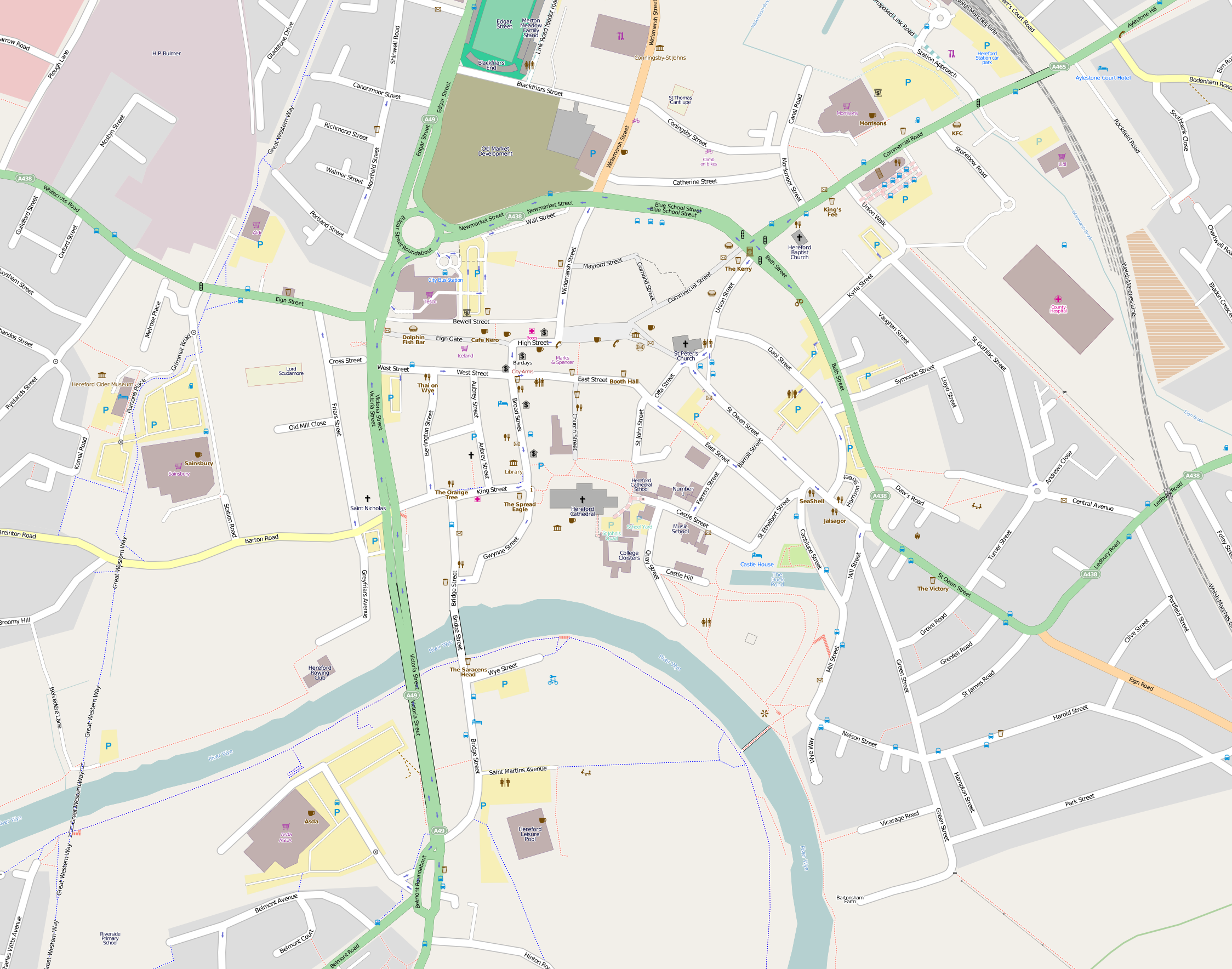
Locations of monastic houses in Hereford

The following is a list of the monastic houses in Herefordshire, England.

Alien houses are included, as are smaller establishments such as cells and notable monastic granges (particularly those with resident monks), and also camerae of the military orders of monks (Knights Templar and Knights Hospitaller). Monastic hospitals are included where they had the status or function of an abbey, priory, or preceptor/commandery.

Abbreviations and key

Status of remains
| Symbol | Status |
|---|---|
| None | Ruins |
| * | Current monastic function |
| ^{+} | Current non-monastic ecclesiastic function (including remains incorporated into later structure) |
| ^ | Current non-ecclesiastic function (including remains incorporated into later structure) or redundant intact structure |
| ^{$} | Remains limited to earthworks etc. |
| ^{#} | No identifiable trace of the monastic foundation remains |
| ^{~} | Exact site of monastic foundation unknown |
| ^{≈} | Identification ambiguous or confused |

Locations with names in italics indicate possible duplication (misidentification with another location) or non-existent foundations (either erroneous reference or proposed foundation never implemented) or ecclesiastical establishments with a monastic name but lacking actual monastic connection.

Trusteeship
| EH | English Heritage |
| LT | Landmark Trust |
| NT | National Trust |

| Foundation | Image | Communities & provenance | Formal name or dedication & alternative names | References & location |
|---|---|---|---|---|
| Aconbury Priory | | Sisters of St John of Jerusalem with brethren founded 13th century (c.1200) by Margery (Margaret), wife of Walter de Lacy on a site granted by King John; with a hospital, and attached to the preceptory of Dinmore; Augustinian Canonesses refounded 1237 with Papal permission; dissolved 1539 (?); granted to Hugh de Harry 1541/2; priory church (restored by Sir George Gilbert Scott 1863) in parochial use as the Parish Church of Saint John until 1967 | The Priory Church of the Holy Cross, Aconbury St John the Baptist ____________________; Acornbury Priory | 51°59′53″N 2°42′19″W |
| Acton Beauchamp Monastery | | grant of land 718 (727?) as "perpetual dwelling of servants of God", otherwise unknown | | |
| Archenfield Monastery | | founded before 914–917, when Cyfeiliog, 'Bishop of Archenfield' was captured by Norsemen | | |
| Aymestrey Priory | | Augustinian Canons Regular — Victorine transferred from Shobdon; founded c.1150(?); dissolution unknown: transferred to Wigmore | | |
| Barton Priory? | | Benedictine monks founded before 1199 (recorded by Gervase of Canterbury — possibly Brockbury (Colwall)) | | |
| Belmont Abbey * | | Benedictine monks founded 1859; extant Roman Catholic priory-cathedral founded 1859 status raised to abbey-cathedral 1917; dissolved 1920; see transferred to St David's Cathedral, Cardiff | The Abbey Church of Saint Michael and All Angels, Belmont | 52°02′22″N 2°45′23″W |
| Beodune Priory | | Augustinian Canons Regular — Victorine transferred from Wigmore c.1155; founded c.1155(?); dissolution unknown; transferred to Shobdon after 1155? | Byton Priory? | |
| Bosbury Preceptory | | Knights Templar founded c.1217–1219 by William Marshall, Earl of Pembroke; dissolved 1308–12; Knights Hospitaller founded 1312; dissolved 1410; merged with Dinmore and Garway 1410; house named 'Temple Court' possibly built on site 18th century | Upleadon Preceptory | 52°05′14″N 2°27′09″W |
| Cheleburne Priory? | | Augustinian Canons Regular (possibly Chirbury Priory, Shropshire) | Chalborn Priory; possibly Pynkney Priory possibly Chirbury Priory | |
| Clifford Priory ^ | | Cluniac monks alien house: dependent on Lewes, Sussex founded 1129-30 by Simon fitz Richard; became denizen: independent from sometime between 1351 and 1374; dissolved 1536; granted to William Herbert, Earl of Pembroke 1553; site occupied by Priory Farm, which probably incorporates monastic remains | The Blessed Virgin Mary | 52°05′39″N 3°05′29″W |
| Colwall Priory | | Benedictine monks cell dependent on Great Malvern, Worcestershire; founded before 1199; dissolved ? | Brockbury Priory | 52°04′33″N 2°23′43″W |
| Craswall Priory | | Grandmontine monks alien house: dependent on Grandmont; founded c.1225 by Walter de Lacy; dissolved 1462; granted to God's House College, Cambridge 1462 | St Mary's Priory | 52°01′57″N 3°03′43″W |
| Dinmore Monastery (?) | | order and foundation unknown; small monastic community apparently existed prior to the arrival of the Knights (see immediately below) | | |
| Dinmore Preceptory | | Knights Hospitaller founded before 1189; chapel 14th century; dissolved before 1535: privately leased; granted to Sir Thomas Palmer in 1548; chapel restored 1886 by H F St John | Chapel of St John of Jerusalem; Dynmore Preceptory | 52°08′55″N 2°45′10″W |
| Dore Abbey ^{+}, Abbey Dore | | Cistercian monks — from Morimond founded 26 April 1147 by Robert Ewyas; dissolved 1537; granted to John Scudamore 1539/40; church restored 1633 and now in parochial use | Abbey Dore | 52°02′20″N 2°45′22″W |
| Dulas Monastery | | Benedictine monks purportedly founded here; transferred to Ewyas Harold | | |
| Ewyas Harold Priory | | Benedictine monks cell dependent on Gloucester; founded after 1100 by Harold son of Ralph of the Vexin: church of St Michael granted by Harold, Lord of Ewyas, purportedly first established at Dulas; dissolved 1358 monks withdrawn due to lack of revenue | St James and St Bartholomew | 51°57′10″N 2°53′40″W |
| Flanesford Priory ^ | | Augustinian Canons Regular founded 1346/47 by Richard Talbot, 2nd Baron Talbot; dissolved 1537; granted to George, Earl of Shrewsbury 1538/39; converted into a farm; remains now incorporated into a private house | The Priory Church of Saint Mary the Virgin and Saint John the Baptist, Flanesford | 51°52′17″N 2°36′44″W |
| Garway Preceptory | | Knights Templar founded 1185-88: grant made by Henry II; dissolved 1308–12; Knights Hospitaller refounded after 1312; merged with Dinmore before 1489; dissolved before 1535 with Dinmore | | 51°53′54″N 2°47′36″W |
| Garway Clas | | Celtic monks — clas to 11th century? | | |
| Hentland Monastery | | Celtic monks purportedly founded 6th century by St Dubricius | | 51°56′03″N 2°39′58″W |
| Hereford Cathedral Priory | | secular episcopal diocesan cathedral founded 669 (680); extant; Benedictine monks — abbey? founded c.1025 built early 11th century; destroyed 1055; dissolved before 1066; rebuilt 12th century by Bishop Renhelm | The Cathedral Church of the Blessed Virgin Mary and Saint Ethelbert in Hereford | 52°03′15″N 2°42′58″W |
| Saint Guthlac's Priory, Hereford | | probable Saxon minster secular collegiate: St Guthlac's Collegiate Church founded before 1066; Benedictine monks — monastic church or chapel founded c.1101; united with Hereford priory; badly damaged in the Baron's War c.1143; and amalgamated with Hereford Priory 1143; transferred to new site outside the town (see immediately below) | St Guthlac's in the Castle | 52°03′07″N 2°42′45″W |
| Hereford Priory | | secular collegiate: St Peter's Collegiate Church founded before 1084; Benedictine monks transferred from earlier site (see immediately above); dependent on Gloucester; granted to Gloucester Abbey by Hugh de Lacy 1100; dissolved 1538; granted to John ap Rice 1542/43 | St Guthlac St Peter, St Paul and St Guthlac | 52°03′29″N 2°42′30″W |
| Hereford Blackfriars — earlier site | | Dominican Friars (under the Visitation of Oxford) founded 1246 by Sir John Daniel; transferred to new site 1322 (see immediately below) | | 52°03′27″N 2°43′23″W (approx) |
| Hereford Blackfriars | | Dominican Friars (under the Visitation of Oxford) founded 1246 at earlier site (see immediately above); transferred to new site 1322; dissolved; granted to Elizabeth Wynne 1562/63 | | 52°03′36″N 2°42′50″W |
| Hereford Greyfriars | | Franciscan Friars Minor (under the Custody of Bristol) founded before 1228; dissolved 1538 | | |
| Hereford Preceptory | | Knights Hospitaller | | |
| Holme Lacy | projected house of Premonstratensian Canons c.1235; daughter house of Lavendon; establishment never implemented | | St Mary and St Thomas Martyr | |
| Kilpeck Priory^{#} | | Benedictine monks founded c.1134 by Hugh, son of William the Norman who granted the church to Gloucester; dissolved 1428 when the cell was united to Gloucester; granted to the Bishop of Gloucester | Kilpecke Priory | 51°58′06″N 2°48′21″W |
| Kinsham Grange | | Benedictine monks alien house; (Note: Royal Commission on Ancient and Historical Monuments (Herefordshire)) | | 52°16′53″N 2°54′37″W (supposed); 52°16′14″N 2°56′22″W (possible) |
| Leominster nunnery | | | | |
| Leominster Priory ^{+} | | Saxon nuns (possibly also monks) purportedly built c.660 by Merwald, King of West Mercia; destroyed in raids by the Danes 9th century; secular canons collegiate refounded 9th century; nuns 9th century; destroyed 1046; Benedictine monks founded after 1123: ruined monastery granted to Reading by Henry I, confirmed by Richard, Bishop of Hereford; rebuilt 12th century, fully conventual by 1139; dissolved 1539and granted to the bailiffs and burgesses of Leominster | St Peter (660); The Priory Church of Saint Peter and Saint Paul, Leominster (12th century) | 52°13′46″N 2°44′08″W |
| Leominster Priory | | Cluniac monks | | |
| Limebrook Priory | | Augustinian Canonesses (or Benedictine nuns? (Note: Limebrook given by Monasticon Anglicanum as Benedictine alien house, dependent on Avenay; Notitia Monastica, however, asserts that to be possibly mistaking for Limbergh)) founded c.1189 (during or before the reign of Richard I) by Robert de Lingen or a member of the Mortimer family; Augustinian Canonesses 1516 (in the time of Bishop Booth); dissolved 28 December 1539; granted to John West and Robert Gratwick 1553 | St Mary ____________________; Lymbroke Priory | 52°17′20″N 2°55′10″W |
| Moccas Clas | | Celtic monks reputedly founded 6th century by St Dubricius from Hennland on Wye; dissolved before 1066? | Mochros | |
| Monkland Priory | | Benedictine monks alien house: cell dependent on Conches founded before 1100; dissolved c.1414 | | |
| Much Dewchurch Clas | | monks of St David founded 6th century; parochial? before 1066 | | |
| Ocle Priory | | Benedictine monks alien house: cell dependent on Lyre; founded c.1100 by the ancestors of Robert Chandos; granted to the Carthusians at Sheen, Surrey c.1414; granted to Sir Philip Hobby 1541/42; site now occupied by Livers Ocle farmhouse | Acley Priory; Livers Ocle Priory | 52°06′53″N 2°37′08″W |
| Shobdon Priory | | Augustinian Canons Regular — Victorine dependent on Bristol; founded between 1131 and 1135 (during the reign of Henry I and tenure of Robert de Bethune, Bishop of Hereford) by Oliver de Merlimound, steward for (and on behalf of) Hugh Mortimer; transferred to [Eye, nr.] Aymestrey c.1150; transferred from Beodune (?Byton) after 1155; transferred to north of Wigmore | | 52°15′38″N 2°52′44″W |
| Sutton Camera | | Knights Hospitaller under Dinmore | | |
| Titley Priory ^{#} | | Tironensian monks apparent alien house: cell dependent on Tiron; founded 1120–21; dissolved 1391; granted to Winchester College c.1535; church rebuilt 1865; house named "Priory Cottage" built on site 16th century | St Peter | 52°14′09″N 2°58′50″W |
| Welsh Bicknor Clas | | dissolved before 1100 | | |
| Wigmore Priory | | Augustinian Canons Regular — Victorine (community founded at Shobdon 1131-35); transferred from [Eye, nr.] Aymestry; transferred to Beodune (? Byton) | | |
| Wigmore Abbey ^ | | Augustinian Canons Regular — Victorine — from Shobdon; (community founded at Shobdon between 1131 and 1135); transferred here 1172-79 by Hugh Mortimer, Baron Wigmore; dissolved 1538; granted to Sir Thomas Palmer 1548/49; remains now incorporated into farm and buildings | St James | 52°20′11″N 2°52′00″W |
| Wormsley Priory | | possibly originally a hermitage; Augustinian Canons Regular — Victorine founded after 1200 (13th century) (late in the reign of John or early in the reign of Henry III) by Gilbert Talbot; dissolved 1539; granted to Edward Lord Clinton 1545/46 | The Priory Church of Saint Mary and Saint Leonard, Wormsley ____________________; Priory of St Leonard de Pyon; Wormeley Abbey (Note: "Wormeley Abbey" — Wm. Cobbett) | 52°07′54″N 2°49′32″W |

== See also ==
- List of monastic houses in England
- List of monastic houses in Wales
