= Cormeilles =

Cormeilles may refer to the following communes in France:

- Cormeilles, Eure, in the Eure département
- Cormeilles, Oise, in the Oise département
- Cormeilles-en-Parisis, in the Val-d'Oise département
- Cormeilles-en-Vexin, in the Val-d'Oise département
- Montigny-lès-Cormeilles, in the Val-d'Oise département
- Saint-Pierre-de-Cormeilles, in the Eure département
- Saint-Sylvestre-de-Cormeilles, in the Eure département
