= Cormeilles Abbey =

Benedictine monastery in Normandy, France

Coordinates: 49°14′15″N 0°23′5″E

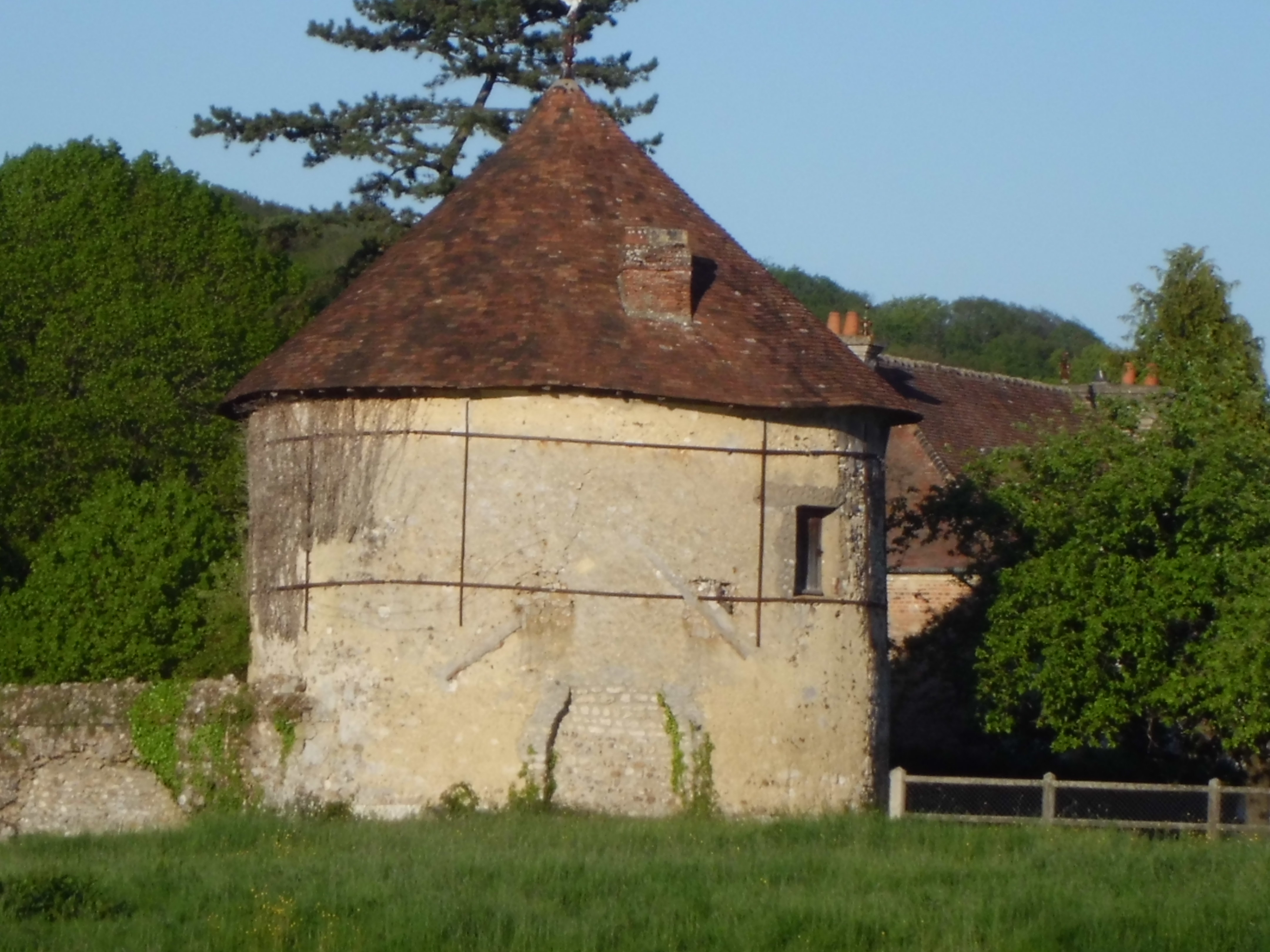
Dovecote at the site of Cormeilles Abbey

Cormeilles Abbey (French: Abbaye Notre-Dame de Cormeilles) was a Benedictine monastery in Cormeilles, Normandy, in what is now the commune of Saint-Pierre-de-Cormeilles, Eure, France. The buildings are now almost completely destroyed.

== Foundation ==
William FitzOsbern and Adeliza de Tosny founded the abbey in around the year 1060, and endowed it richly with lands in England, after the Norman Conquest. He was buried there in 1071. According to Ordericus Vitalis it was one of two religious foundations he established on his estates. The other was the Abbaye Notre-Dame de Lyre.

== Later history ==
The abbey had fallen into disrepair by the fifteenth century. After a series of partial reconstructions, it was suppressed in 1779.

The buildings are now almost completely destroyed, apart from the former abbot's house, the precinct wall and a dovecote. A fragment of vaulting, possibly from a passageway in the cloister, survives in Chepstow Priory Church, displayed on the stump of its crossing tower.

== Priories ==
Chepstow Priory was dependent on Cormeilles, Chepstow having been one of FitzOsbern's grants. Newent Priory, at Newent in Gloucestershire, was a cell of Cormeilles, as was another priory at Kyre, Worcestershire.

The place name Place de Cormeilles in the historic centre of Chepstow commemorates the association of the two places.
