= List of monastic houses in Wales =

List of monastic houses in Wales is a catalogue of abbeys, priories, friaries and other monastic religious houses in Wales.

In this article, alien houses are included, as are smaller establishments such as cells and notable monastic granges (particularly those with resident monks), and also camerae of the military orders of monks (Templars and Hospitallers). The numerous monastic hospitals per se are not included here unless at some time the foundation had, or was purported to have, the status or function of an abbey, priory, friary, preceptory or commandery.

The geographical co-ordinates provided are sourced from details provided by Ordnance Survey publications.

== Overview ==
=== Article layout ===
Communities/provenance: this column shows the status and communities existing at each establishment, together with such dates as have been established as well as the fate of the establishment after dissolution, and the current status of the site.

Formal Name or Dedication: this column shows the formal name of the establishment or the person in whose name the church is dedicated, where known.

Alternative Names: some of the establishments have had alternative names over the course of time. In order to assist in text-searching such alternatives in name or spelling have been provided.

== Abbreviations and key ==
The sites listed are ruins unless indicated thus:
*	indicates current monastic function
^{+}	indicates current non-monastic ecclesiastic function (including remains incorporated into later structure)
^	indicates current non-ecclesiastic function (including remains incorporated into later structure)
^{$}	indicates remains limited to earthworks etc.
^{#}	indicates no identifiable trace of the monastic foundation remains
^{~}	indicates exact site of monastic foundation unknown

Locations with names in italics indicate probable duplication (misidentification with another location)
or non-existent foundations (either erroneous reference or proposed foundation never implemented).

Trusteeship denoted as follows:
Cadw	Cadw — Welsh Historic Monuments

== List of establishments by county ==
=== Anglesey ===
Locations of monastic houses in Anglesey

Foundation	Image	Communities & provenance	Formal name or dedication & alternative names	OnLine references & location
Caergybi Monastery		Celtic monks founded 6th century (380) by St Cybi (St Kebius); Secular canons collegiate 12th century?; dissolved c.1547; ecclesiastical college built on site; granted to Francis Morrice 1609	Holyhead Monastery; Caer Gybi Monastery	53°18′41″N 4°37′57″W
Llanfaes Friary		Franciscan Friars Minor, Conventual (under the Custody of Worcester) founded c.1237–45 by Llywelyn ab Iorwerth, Prince of Gwynedd and Wales; dissolved 1538		53°16′41″N 4°05′31″W
Llanfechell Clas		Celtic monastery founded by St Machudd (Mechell)		
Llangaffo Clas		Celtic monastery founded (at an early date) by St Caffo; dissolved 13th century		53°11′28″N 4°19′38″W
Penmon Priory		Celtic monks founded 6th century, reputedly by St Seiriol destroyed in raids by the Danes; subsequently rebuilt; Augustinian Canons Regular (Benedictine monks?) re-founded 1221 by Llywelyn Fawr, Prince of Gwynedd dissolved. c.1564; granted to John Moore	Glannagh Priory	53°18′20″N 4°03′25″W
Ynys Lannog Cell		Celtic monastery founded 6th century by St Seiriol; Augustinian Canons Regular dependent on Penmon founded 1237–1414; dissolved 1536?	Priestholme Cell; Puffin Island Cell	53°19′15″N 4°01′18″W

=== Bridgend ===
Locations of monastic houses in Bridgend

Foundation	Image	Communities & provenance	Formal name or dedication & alternative names	On-line references & location
Ewenny Priory – St Michael (?)		apparent early priory founded by John Lou[n]dres;	St Michael?	
Ewenny Priory		Benedictine monks cell dependent on Gloucester, Gloucestershire; founded before 1141, granted to Gloucester by Maurice, of London; dissolved 1540 (1536); granted (leased) to Sir Edward Carn, who purchased it in 1545; (Cadw)	St Michael ____________________; Ogmore Priory; Wenny Priory	51°29′20″N 3°34′04″W

=== Cardiff ===
Locations of monastic houses in Cardiff

Foundation	Image	Communities & provenance	Formal name or dedication & alternative names	OnLine references & location
Cardiff Blackfriars		Dominican Friars (under the Visitation of Oxford) founded before 1242; dissolved 1538		51°29′00″N 3°11′08″W
Cardiff Greyfriars		Franciscan Friars Minor, Conventual (under the Custody of Bristol) founded before 1284; dissolved 1538		51°29′01″N 3°10′45″W
Cardiff Priory		Benedictine monks dependent on Tewkesbury, Gloucestershire founded before 1106(?), parish church of St Mary granted by Robert fitz Hamon and others; dissolved 1403	The Blessed Virgin Mary	51°28′25″N 3°10′20″W
Cardiff Whitefriars		Carmelite Friars — (Note: Cardiff Whitefriars — given by W. Dugdale, Monsticon Anglicanum, from Willis, Llandaff, p.11) considered doubtful, (Note: Cardiff Whitefriars — doubtful: Sir John E. Lloyd) rejected		
Llandaff Monastery		Celtic monks founded 6th century (522) by St Dubricius; secular collegiate episcopal diocesan cathedral founded 1107; restored 18th & 19th century; extant	Llandaffe Monastery	51°29′45″N 3°13′04″W

=== Carmarthenshire ===
Locations of monastic houses in Carmarthenshire

Foundation	Image	Communities & provenance	Formal name or dedication & alternative names	OnLine references & location
Bachannis Monastery		purportedly founded c.513 by St Piro		
Carmarthen Greyfriars		Franciscan Friars Minor, Conventual (under the Custody of Bristol); founded before 1284; dissolved 1538; granted to Sir Thomas Gresham 1551/2; site now occupied by Greyfriars shopping centre	Caermarthen Friary	51°51′21″N 4°18′33″W
Carmarthen Clas		Celtic monks founded 6th century by St Dewi; dissolved c.1120; Benedictine priory (later Augustinian) established on site (see immediately below)	Llandeulyddog	51°51′29″N 4°18′01″W
Carmarthen Priory		Benedictine monks St Peter's church granted by Henry I on site of Celtic clas (see immediately above); cell of Battle, Sussex; independent priory; monks induced to leave 1125 in order to found an Augustinian establishment; Augustinian Canons Regular — Arroasian(?) founded before 1127 by King Henry I; dissolved 1536; granted to Richard Andrews and Nicholas Temple 1543/4	The Priory Church of Saint John the Evangelist and Saint Teulyddog, Carmarthen ____________________; Caermarthen Priory	51°51′29″N 4°18′01″W
Kidwelly Priory		Benedictine monks — from Sherborne, Dorset dependent on Sherborne; founded 1114 (c.1130), site granted by Roger, Bishop of Sarum; dissolved 1539	The Priory Church of Saint Mary, Kidwelly now The Parish and Priory Church of Saint Mary, Kidwelly ____________________; Cydweli Priory; Cadwell Priory	51°44′12″N 4°18′23″W
Llanarthney Clas		Celtic monks founded 6th century? by St Dewi; parochial from c.1220		51°51′42″N 4°07′47″W
Llandeilo Monastery		Celtic monks founded (in the time of St David) 6th century by St Teilo; parochial? from c.1107	Llandeilo Fawr Monastery	51°52′54″N 3°59′35″W
Llandovery Priory		Benedictine monks cell dependent on Great Malvern, Worcestershire; founded c.1110 by the Cliffords, church granted by Richard fitz Pons before 1126; dissolved c.1185 due to misconduct of the monks	dedication unknown	51°59′42″N 3°47′44″W
St Clears Priory		Cluniac monks founded 1147–84 (c.1100); dissolved c.1414; granted to All Souls College, Oxford; church in parochial use from 1920	The Priory Church of Saint Mary Magdalene, Saint Clears	51°48′50″N 4°29′40″W
Talley Abbey		Celtic monks clas founded before 1066; Premonstratensian Canons daughter house of St-Jean, Amiens, France founded c.1184-9 (1197), credited to Lord Rhys Gruffydd Price (Rhys ap Tewdwr, Rhese Griffith Price); dissolved c.1536(?) and retained by the Crown; (Cadw)	The Abbey Church of the Blessed Virgin Mary and Saint John the Baptist ____________________; Abaty Talyllychau; Tallagh Abbey; Tallesch; Tallach	51°58′36″N 3°59′31″W
Whitland Abbey		Cistercian monks — from Treffgarn daughter house of Clairvaux; (community sent to West Wales from Clairvaux 16 September 1140, temporarily settled at Treffgarn 1144 by Bernard, Bishop of St Davids) founded here c.1151; dissolved 1539; granted to Henry Audley and John Cordel 1544	The Blessed Virgin Mary ____________________; Albalanda Abbey; 'Abelanda' Abbey; Ty Gwyn ar Daf	51°50′01″N 4°36′03″W

=== Ceredigion ===
Locations of monastic houses in Ceredigion

Foundation	Image	Communities and provenance	Formal name or dedication and alternative names	On-line references and location
Cardigan Priory		Benedictine monks priory cell dependent on Gloucester, Gloucestershire; founded c.1110–15; priory cell dependent on Chertsey, Surrey after 1165 (before 1158?); dissolved 1538; granted to Bisham, Berkshire and subsequently to William and Mary Cavendish 1539/40; converted into a mansion; opened as Cardigan District and Memorial Hospital 1922	The Priory Church of Our Lady of Cardigan ____________________; Cardigan Cell	52°04′58″N 4°39′21″W
Llanbadarn Fawr Priory		Celtic monks founded 6th century; destroyed before 1100; Benedictine monks cell dependent on Gloucester; church of St Paternus granted to Gloucester by Gilbert fitz Richard 1111; founded c.1116-7; lost from Gloucester 1136; secular collegiate refounded before 1144; dissolved ?c.1361-2	The Priory Church of Saint Padarn, Llanbadarn Fawr; St Paternus	52°24′33″N 4°03′40″W
Llanddewi-brefi Clas		monks founded 6th century by St David; secular collegiate founded 1287 (1187) by Thomas Beck, Bishop of St David's; dissolved c.1547	St David ____________________; Llandewi-brevi	
Llanllyr Priory		Cistercian nuns founded c.1180 (before 1197) by Rhees ap Gruffydd, Lord Rhys; dissolved 1536; granted to William Sackville and John Dudley 1553; site currently on privately owned land	The Blessed Virgin Mary ____________________; Llanleir Priory; Llanllŷr; Lanfer; Laller; Lanter; Llanweir	52°10′59″N 4°08′01″W
Strata Florida Abbey		Cistercian monks daughter house of Whitland, Carmarthenshire; transferred from earlier foundation of Strata Florida at Yr Hen Fynachlog (see immediately below) founded 1184 by Rhys ap Gruffydd; dissolved 1539; granted to the Stedman family; (Cadw)	The Blessed Virgin Mary	52°16′31″N 3°50′18″W
Yr Hen Fynachlog (Strata Florida, earlier site)		Cistercian monks — from Whitland, Carmarthenshire founded 1 June 1164 by Robert fitzStephen; transferred to new site at Strata Florida (see immediately above) after 1184	The Blessed Virgin Mary ____________________ 'The Old Monastery'	52°15′55″N 3°52′44″W
Yspyty-Ystwyth		Cistercian monks grange and supposed hospice dependent on Strata Florida; founded c.1180(?)	The Blessed Virgin Mary	

=== Conwy ===
Locations of monastic houses in Conwy

Foundation	Image	Communities & provenance	Formal name or dedication & alternative names	On-line references & location
Aberconwy Abbey ^{+}		Cistercian monks daughter house of Strata Florida; (community founded at Rhedynog-felen 24 (27) July 1186); transferred here 1190 (before 1200) by Llywelyn Fawr of Gwynedd, removed from Rhedynog-felen, founded by Llewellvyn ab Iorwerth, becoming benefactor and patron before c.1200; community transferred to new site at Maenan 1283; church now in parochial use	The Abbey Church of Saint Mary and All Saints ____________________; Abaty Aberconwy; Conway Abbey	53°16′50″N 3°49′44″W
Abergele Clas		Celtic monks founded before 856		
Maenan Abbey		Cistercian monks — from Aberconwy (community founded at Rhedynog-felen 24 (27) July 1186); transferred here 1283 after forced move by order of Edward I; dissolved c.1538; granted to Elezeus Wynne (the Wynne family) 1562/3; in ownership of William Frederick; site now occupied by hotel and grounds	The Abbey Church of Saint Mary and All Saints ____________________; Abaty Maenan; Maynan Abbey	53°10′28″N 3°48′45″W
Gwytherin Nunnery		Celtic nuns connected with St Winefride	Witheriac Nunnery	
Ysbyty Ifan Preceptory		Knights Hospitaller founded c.1190; united with Halston, Shropshire 1294; in use 1338 but no longer housed a community; dissolution unknown	Ysbyty Ifan; Dol Gynwal Preceptory	53°01′21″N 3°43′30″W

=== Denbighshire ===
Locations of monastic houses in Denbighshire

Foundation	Image	Communities & provenance	Formal name or dedication & alternative names	On-line references & location
Denbigh Friary		Carmelite Friars founded 1343–50 (or before 1289?); dissolved 1538	St Mary ____________________; Henllan Friary	53°11′16″N 3°24′33″W
Llandrillo Clas		Celtic monks church of St Teilo founded 7th century; under abbot 9th century to c.1150; parochial ? from after 1276		
Llanynys Clas		Celtic monks founded 6th century (SS Mor and Saeran); clas under abbot until 15th century		
Rhuddlan Friary		Dominican Friars (under the visitation of Oxford) founded before 1258; dissolved 1538; granted to Henry ap Harry 1540/1	Rhudland Friary; Rhudlan	
Ruthin Priory		Bonshommes Canons founded 1310 by John de Grey, Lord of Dyffryn; dissolved 1535; granted to William Winlove and John Stevens 1550/1; wall fragment remains to northwest of collegiate church		53°06′57″N 3°18′41″W
Ruthin Whitefriars		Carmelite Friars — (Note: Ruthin Whitefriars — given by W. Dugdale, Monsticon Anglicanum and T. Tanner, Notitia Monastica, citing J. Leland) considered most doubtful (Note: Ruthin Whitefriars — doubtful: Sir John E. Lloyd)		
St Asaph Monastery		Celtic monks founded c.mid-6th century by St Asaph (Hassaph); secular collegiate episcopal diocesan cathedral founded 1143; extant		53°15′26″N 3°26′31″W
Vale of Clwyd Monastery		purportedly founded by St Elerius (Elwy)	Clwyd Valley Monastery	
Valle Crucis Abbey		Cistercian monks — from Strata Marcella founded 28 January 1201 by Madog ap Gruffydd Maelor, Prince of Powys at the instance of the abbots of Whitland, Strata Florida, Strata Marcella and Cwmhir; dissolved 1536/7 and granted to Sir William Pickering granted to Edward Wotton c.1611; (Cadw)	The Abbey Church of the Blessed Virgin Mary, Valle Crucis ____________________; Abaty Glyn y Groes; Abaty Glyn Egwestl; De Valle Crucis Llanegwast	52°59′20″N 3°11′11″W

=== Flintshire ===
Locations of monastic houses in Flintshire

Foundation	Image	Communities & provenance	Formal name or dedication & alternative names	On-line references & location
Basingwerk Abbey		Savignac monks — from Savigny founded 11 July 1131 by Ranulph, Earl of Chester; Cistercian monks orders merged 17 September 1147; dissolved 1535; granted to Henry ap Harry and Peter Mutton 1540/1; briefly refounded under Queen Mary (Cadw)	The Abbey Church of the Blessed Virgin Mary ____________________; Abaty Dinas Basing	53°17′17″N 3°12′27″W
Talacre Abbey		Benedictine nuns founded 1868; transferred to Curzon, Cheshire, 1988		53°20′22″N 3°20′48″W

=== Gwynedd ===
Locations of monastic houses in Gwynedd
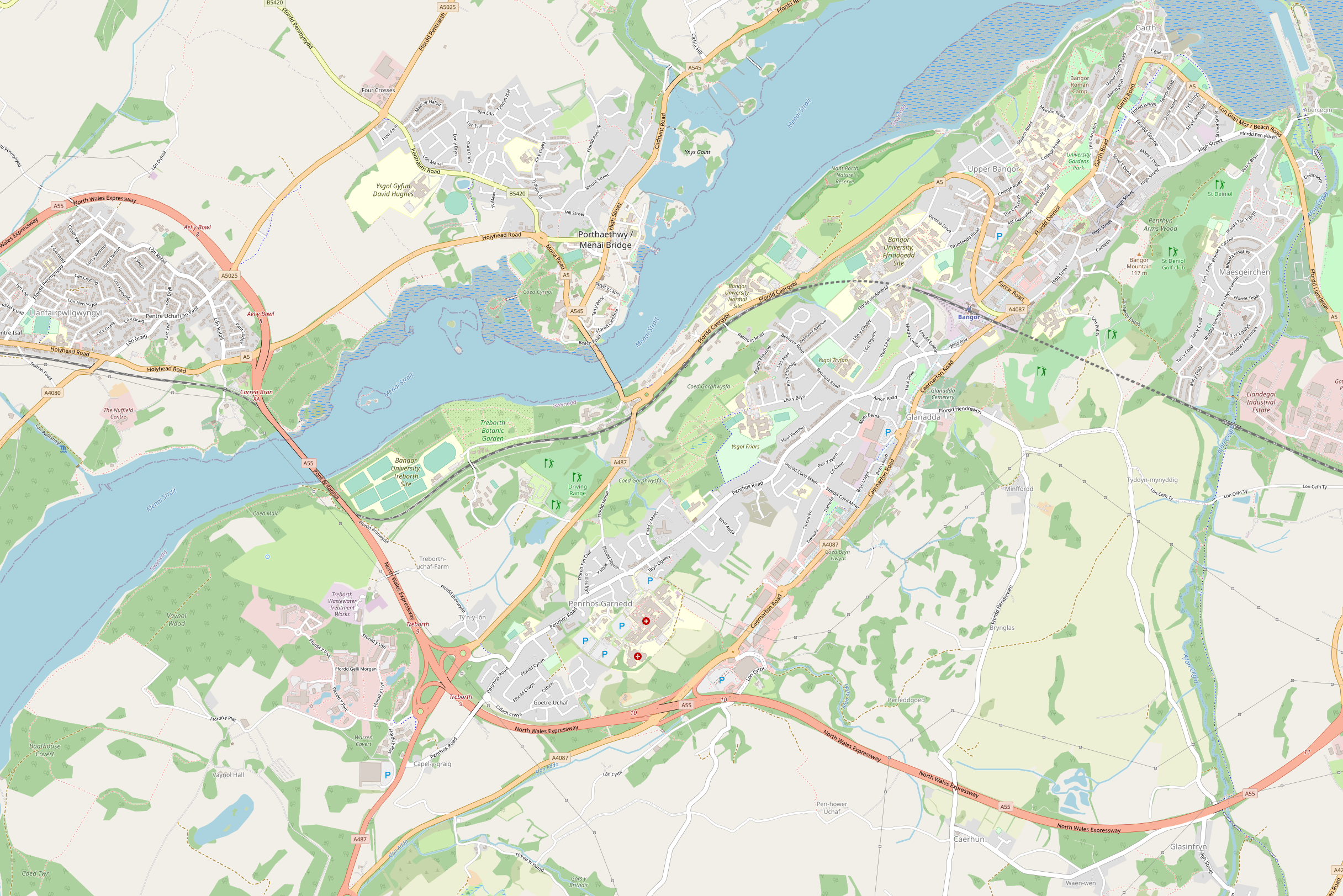
Locations of monastic houses in Bangor

Foundation	Image	Communities & provenance	Formal name or dedication & alternative names	On-line references & location
Aberdaron Clas		Celtic monks — from Bardsey; clas founded 6th century by St Hyrwyn, disciple of St Dubricius; abbey 8th century; secular collegiate to after 1252		52°48′19″N 4°42′42″W
Bangor Blackfriars		Dominican Friars (under the Visitation of Oxford) founded before 1251 by Llywelyn ap Gruffydd; purportedly enlarged/rebuilt 1299; dissolved 1538; granted to Thomas Brown 1553; converted into a Free School 1557		53°13′03″N 4°09′08″W
Bangor Monastery		Celtic monks founded 6th century; secular collegiate episcopal diocesan cathedral founded c.1092; extant	The Cathedral Church of Saint Deniol, Bangor	53°13′35″N 4°07′38″W
Bardsey Abbey		Culdee monks founded c./before 516?; Augustinian Canons Regular founded before 1240 (c.1210) by Llywelyn the Great of Gwynedd; dissolved c.1537; granted to John, Earl of Warwick 1549/50; in ownership of Bardsey Island Trust, with public access	The Abbey of Saint Mary	52°45′52″N 4°47′15″W
Beddgelert Priory		Celtic monks founded 6th/7th century; Augustinian Canons Regular founded c.1198 (c.1200–40) by Llywelyn the Great; granted to the Carthusians at Chertsey, Surrey 1537; dissolved with it 19 June 1538; granted to Lord Radnor by Henry VIII	The Priory Church of Saint Mary, Beddgelert now The Priory and Parish Church of Saint Mary, Beddgelert ____________________; Bethkelert Priory; Bekelert; 'the priory of the Valley St Mary of Snowdon(ia)'	^{&} 53°00′40″N 4°06′06″W
Clynnog Fawr Abbey		Celtic monks founded c.616 by St Beuno; dissolved before 1291; Cistercian monks? refounded 13th century; secular collegiate refounded before 1291; dissolved 1547; parochial church reputedly on site	Clynnog Fawr Monastery; Clynnog-fawr Abbey	53°01′08″N 4°21′52″W
Corwen Monastery		Celtic monks founded 6th–7th century; dissolution unknown		
Cymer Abbey		Cistercian monks daughter house of Cwm Hir; founded 1198/9 by Gruffudd and Maredudd ap Cynan (or Llywelyn ab Iorwerth (Lleweline son of Gervase); dissolved 1536; (Cadw)	The Abbey Church of the Blessed Virgin Mary, Llanelltyd ____________________; Cymmer Abbey; Mynachlog y Faner'; Kinner Abbey	52°45′30″N 3°53′46″W
Rhedynog-felen Abbey		Cistercian monks daughter house of Strata Florida founded 27 (24) July 1186 removed to Aberconwy c.1190 (not later than 1192)	The Blessed Virgin Mary	53°05′36″N 4°17′38″W
St Tudwal's Island Monastery		Celtic monks, Culdees founded 6th century; Augustinian Canons Regular founded before 1417; dissolved 1535(?)	Ynys Tudwal Monastery; Modstedwall Monastery	52°48′19″N 4°27′38″W
Towyn Clas		Celtic monks — from Bardsey founded 6th century by St Cadfan from Bardsey; under an abbot 1147		

=== Monmouthshire ===
Locations of monastic houses in Monmouthshire

Foundation	Image	Communities & provenance	Formal name or dedication & alternative names	On-line references & location
Abergavenny Priory ^{+}		Benedictine monks alien house: dependent on St-Vincent, Le Mans; founded 1087–1100 by Hamelinus de Barham (Hamelin Balon); became denizen: independent from 1415; dissolved 1536; church now in parochial use	The Priory Church of St Mary the Virgin, Abergavenny	51°49′17″N 3°00′56″W
Caerwent Clas		Celtic monks founded c.6th century, patron St Tathan; parochial from after 1066?		51°36′42″N 2°46′05″W
Chepstow Priory ^{+}		Benedictine monks alien house: daughter house of Cormeilles, Normandy (due to which, twin-town with Chepstow) founded before 1071 (1072) by William FitzOsbern, Earl of Hereford; became denizen: independent from c.1442; dissolved 1536; masonry used for building, part of structure collapsed; rebuilt; in use as parochial church	The Priory Church of Saint Mary, Chepstow ____________________; Striguil Priory; Strogull Priory	51°38′34″N 2°40′20″W
Goldcliff Priory		Benedictine monks alien house: cell dependent on Bec Hellouin founded 1113 by Robert de Chandos; became denizen c.1414: destroyed by flood 1424 cell dependent on Tewkesbury, Gloucestershire 1442 at suppression of alien houses	The Priory Church of Saint Mary Magdalene, Goldcliff	51°32′16″N 2°54′19″W
Grace Dieu Abbey ^{#}		Cistercian monks — from Abbey Dore, Herefordshire daughter house of Waverley, Surrey; founded 24 April 1226 by Sir John of Monmouth; apparently ruined in incursions by the Welsh 1233; dissolved 1536; granted to Thomas Herbert and William Bretton 1545	The Blessed Virgin Mary	51°48′50″N 2°47′49″W
Kemeys Commander		Knights Templar manor or camera; Knights Hospitaller member of Garway, Herefordshire	Kemeys Commandery; Kemeys Preceptory	51°44′07″N 2°56′35″W
Llangua Priory		Benedictine monks alien house: dependent on Lyre founded 1183, manor and church granted before 1183; dissolved c.1420; granted to the Carthusians at Sheen, Surrey (London); remains in	dedication unknown ____________________; Llangwyfan Priory	51°55′37″N 2°53′20″W
Llanthony Priory		hermitage founded between 1087 and 1100 by William, knight who became hermit here during the reign of William II); joined by Ersinius, priest 1103, and others later, rebuilding an old church; consecrated and dedicated to John the Baptist 1108; Augustinian Canons Regular founded before 1108 by Hugh de Lacy; became a cell dependent on Llanthony Secunda, Gloucestershire 1481 when monks transferred there due to hardships under the Welsh; dissolved 1538 and granted to Nicholas Arnold; purchased by Col. Sir Mark Wood, who converted buildings into a house; sold 1807 to Walter Savage Landor; (Cadw)	The Priory Church of Saint John the Baptist, Llanthony ____________________; Llanhodenei Priory; Lantony Priory; Llanthony Prima; Llanhodenei	51°56′41″N 3°02′10″W
Magor Grange		Cistercian monks alien house: grange dependent on Gloria Dei; founded 1239; became denizen: grange dependent on Tintern 1247		
Monmouth Priory		Benedictine monks alien house: cell dependent on St-Florent-de-Saumur; founded before 1086, church of St Cadoc and other endowments granted by Withenoc of Monmouth (Wihenoc de Monemue) who built St Mary's Priory; became denizen: independent from 1415; dissolved 1540; granted to Richard Price and Thomas Perry	The Priory Church of the Blessed Virgin Mary and Saint Florent at Monmouth	51°48′47″N 2°42′50″W
Newport Friary		Augustinian Friars (under the Limit of Oxford) founded before 1377; dissolved 1538		51°35′14″N 2°59′39″W
Newport Clas		Celtic monks founded 6th century, purportedly after 520 (located near the separate accommodations where St Woolos (GwynLlyw) and his wife Gwladys retired as hermits in old age)		
St Kynemark Priory		uncertain order founded before 1291 (1270); dissolved c.1535; site currently within a residential housing estate	St Kenmercy; Cynmarch; Kingsmark	51°38′18″N 2°40′24″W
Tintern Abbey		Savignac monks daughter house of L'Aumône; founded 9 May 1131 by Walter fitz Richard de Clare; Cistercian monks orders merged 17 September 1147; dissolved 1539; granted to Henry, Earl of Worcester; (Cadw)	The Abbey Church of the Blessed Virgin Mary, Tintern ____________________; Abaty Tyndyrn	51°41′49″N 2°40′36″W
Usk Priory		Benedictine nuns founded c.1160 (before 1236) by Richard 'Strongbow' de Clare; with regular priests or brethren until after 1330; dissolved 1536; granted to Roger Williams 1544	The Priory Church of Saint Mary, Usk ____________________; Cairusk; Brynbuga	51°42′09″N 2°54′00″W

=== Neath Port Talbot ===
Locations of monastic houses in Neath Port Talbot

Foundation	Image	Communities & provenance	Formal name or dedication & alternative names	On-line references & location
Margam Abbey ^{+}		Celtic monks clas founded ?6th century; Cistercian monks daughter house of Clairvaux; founded 21 November 1147 by Robert, Earl of Gloucester; dissolved 1536; sold to Sir Rice Mansel (Sir Richard Moxell) who demolished much of it and built a mansion on the site; now partly in parochial church use and partly in council ownership; later in ownership of Thomas, Lord Mansel;	The Abbey Church of the Blessed Virgin Mary, Margam ____________________; Morgan Abbey	51°33′46″N 3°43′51″W
Neath Abbey		Savignac monks daughter house of Savigny founded 25 October 1130 by Sir Richard de Granville (Grainville); Cistercian monks 1147; dissolved 1539; granted to Sir Richard Williams alias Cromwell	The Abbey Church of the Holy Trinity and the Blessed Virgin Mary, Neath ____________________; Neth Abbey	51°39′39″N 3°49′35″W

=== Newport ===
Locations of monastic houses in Newport

Foundation	Image	Communities & provenance	Formal name or dedication & alternative names	On-line references & location
Bassaleg Priory		Benedictine monks cell dependent on Glastonbury, Somerset; founded 1116 (1101), church of St Basilius granted to Glastonbury by Robert de Haya; dissolved before 1252, Michael, Abbot of Glaston, let as farm	St Basil ____________________; Basaleg Priory; Basselech; Basele	51°34′42″N 3°03′16″W
Malpas Priory		Cluniac monks alien house: cell of Montacute, Somerset; founded before 1122 by Winibald de Caerleon (Winebald de Baeluns); became denizen: independent from 1407; dissolved 1539; granted to Sir William Herbert c.1547	St Mary ____________________; Malpas Cell	51°36′55″N 3°00′24″W
Newport Friary		Augustinian Friars (under the Limit of Oxford) founded before 1377; dissolved 1538		51°35′14″N 2°59′39″W
Newport Clas		Celtic monks founded 6th century, purportedly after 520 (located near the separate accommodations where St Woolos (GwynLlyw) and his wife Gwladys retired as hermits in old age)		

=== Pembrokeshire ===
Locations of monastic houses in Pembrokeshire
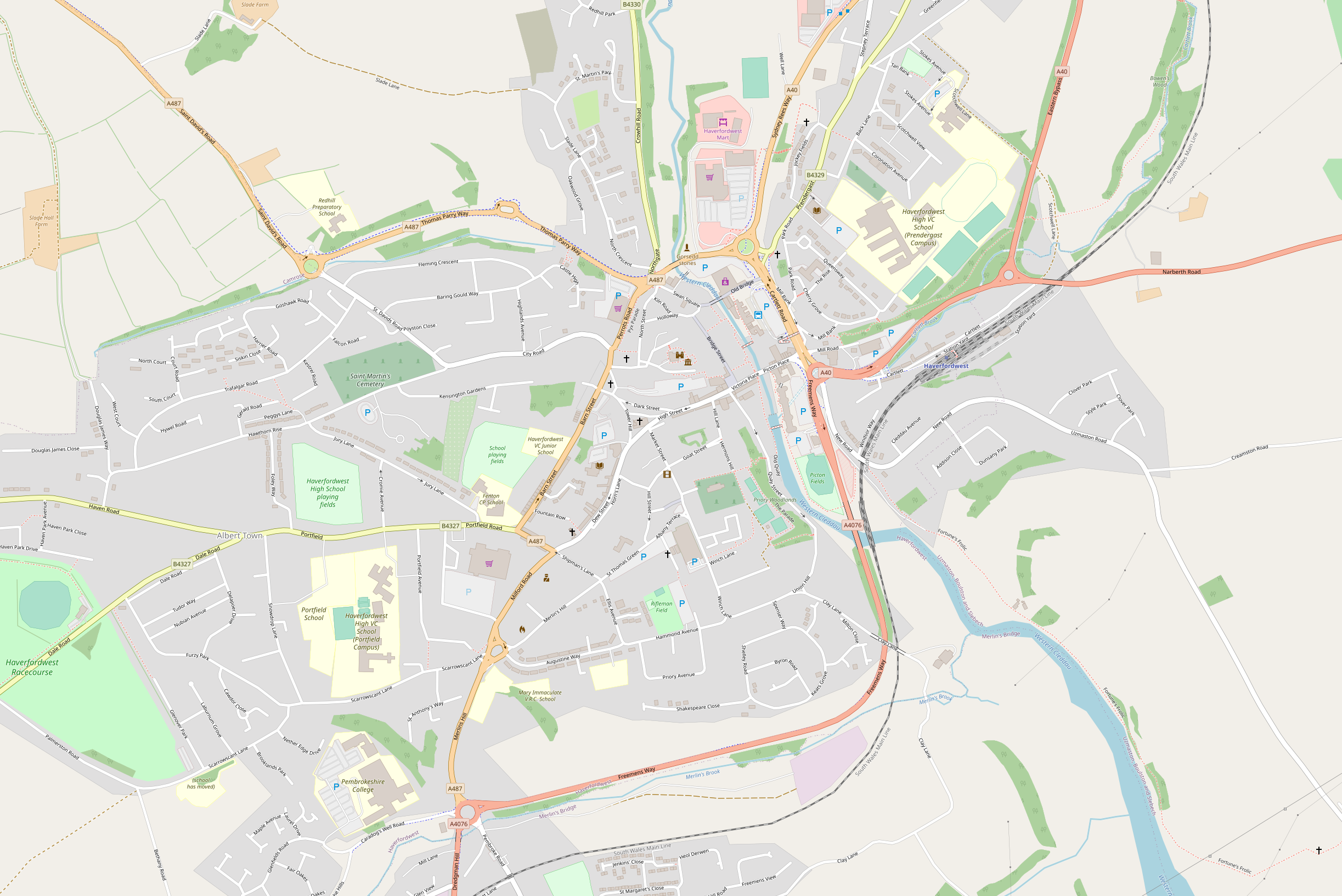
Locations of monastic houses in Haverfordwest
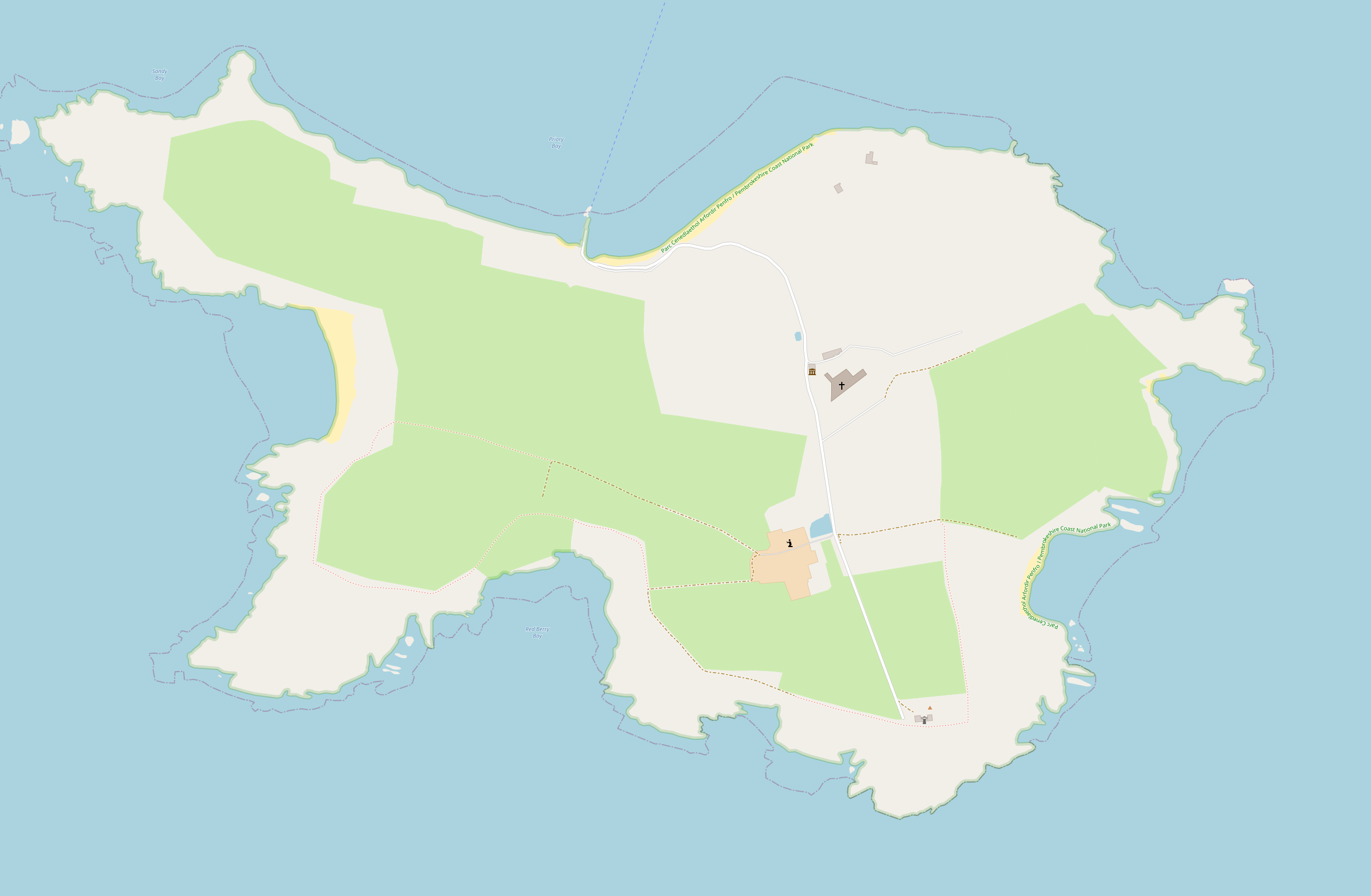
Locations of monastic houses on Caldey Island

Foundation	Image	Communities & provenance	Formal name or dedication & alternative names	On-line references & location
Caldey Island Priory		Celtic monks — from Llantwit Major founded late-5th century? (6th century), settlement possibly ended by raids by the Danes 10th century Benedictine monks — from St Dogmaels refounded after 1113–1115; dissolved 1536	Caldey Cell; Caldy Priory; Ynys Pyr	51°38′04″N 4°41′17″W
Caldey Abbey *		Anglican Benedictine purchased 1906 and built present abbey converted to Catholicism 1913 sold due to financial difficulties 1925; Cistercian monks founded 1926; extant		51°38′16″N 4°41′12″W
Haverfordwest Blackfriars		Dominican Friars (under the Visitation of Oxford) founded before 1246; dissolved 1538	St Saviour	51°48′10″N 4°58′04″W
Haverfordwest Priory		Augustinian Canons Regular founded before 1200 by Robert of Haverford; dissolved 1536; granted to Roger and Thomas Barlow c.1546	The Blessed Virgin Mary and St Thomas the Martyr ____________________; Haverford Priory	51°47′54″N 4°57′52″W
Monkton Priory		Benedictine monks alien house: dependent on St-Martin, Séez; founded 1098 by the Anulph de Montgomery, Earl of Pembroke, church of St Nicholas granted to Séez until 1441; became denizen: granted to St Albans, Hertfordshire 1413; dissolved after 1535; granted to John Vaughan c.1545	St Nicholas ____________________; Pembroke Priory; Pembroke Cell	51°40′32″N 4°55′24″W
Nevern Monastery		Celtic monks founded 5th century by St Brynach; parochial from 1115		
Penally Clas ^{+}		Celtic monks founded 6th century by St Teilo; dissolved c.1100; remains incorporated into Church in Wales parish church of SS Nicholas & Teilo		51°39′35″N 4°43′22″W
Pill Priory		Tironensian monks daughter house of St Dogmaels founded after 1113–1115 (1200) by Adam de Rupe (Adam de Roche); dissolved 1536; granted to Roger and Thomas Barlow c.1541	The Blessed Virgin Mary and St Budoc ____________________; Pille Priory; Pilla Priory; Hubberston Priory	51°43′28″N 5°02′30″W
Ramsey Island Monastery		Celtic monks		
St Dogmaels Abbey		Celtic monks founded 6th century; destroyed 987; clas later; Tironensian monks alien house: daughter house of Tiron, Normandy founded c.1113–15 by Robert fitzMartin; raised to abbey status 1120; dissolved 1536; granted to John Bradshaw (Cadw)	The Blessed Virgin Mary and St Dogmael ____________________; St Dogmells Abbey; Llandudoch Abbey	52°04′50″N 4°40′50″W
Slebech Preceptory		Knights Hospitaller founded 1161–76, reputedly by Wizo and his son (or grandson) Walter; granted to Gloucester by Wizo; dissolved before 1540; granted to Roger and Thomas Barlow	Slebagh Preceptory; Slebach Preceptory	51°47′21″N 4°51′18″W
Templeton		Knights Templar possibly small hostel or hospice; founded before 1185(?); dissolved before 1300; in private hands by the end of the 13th century		
Tenby Whitefriars ?		Carmelite Friars? purportedly founded 1399; (Note: Tenby Whitefriars — Royal Commission on the Ancient and Historical Monuments of Wales: Pembroke (1925), p.398 states lack of grounds to associate 'The Carmelites' with friars or nuns; probably a choristers' school connected with parochial church)		
Treffgarn Abbey		Cistercian monks daughter house of Clairvaux; (community sent to West Wales from Clairvaux 16 September 1140); founded c.1144, temporarily settled here by Bernard, Bishop of St Davids; transferred to Whitland, Carmarthenshire 1151	The Blessed Virgin Mary	

=== Powys ===
Locations of monastic houses in Anglesey
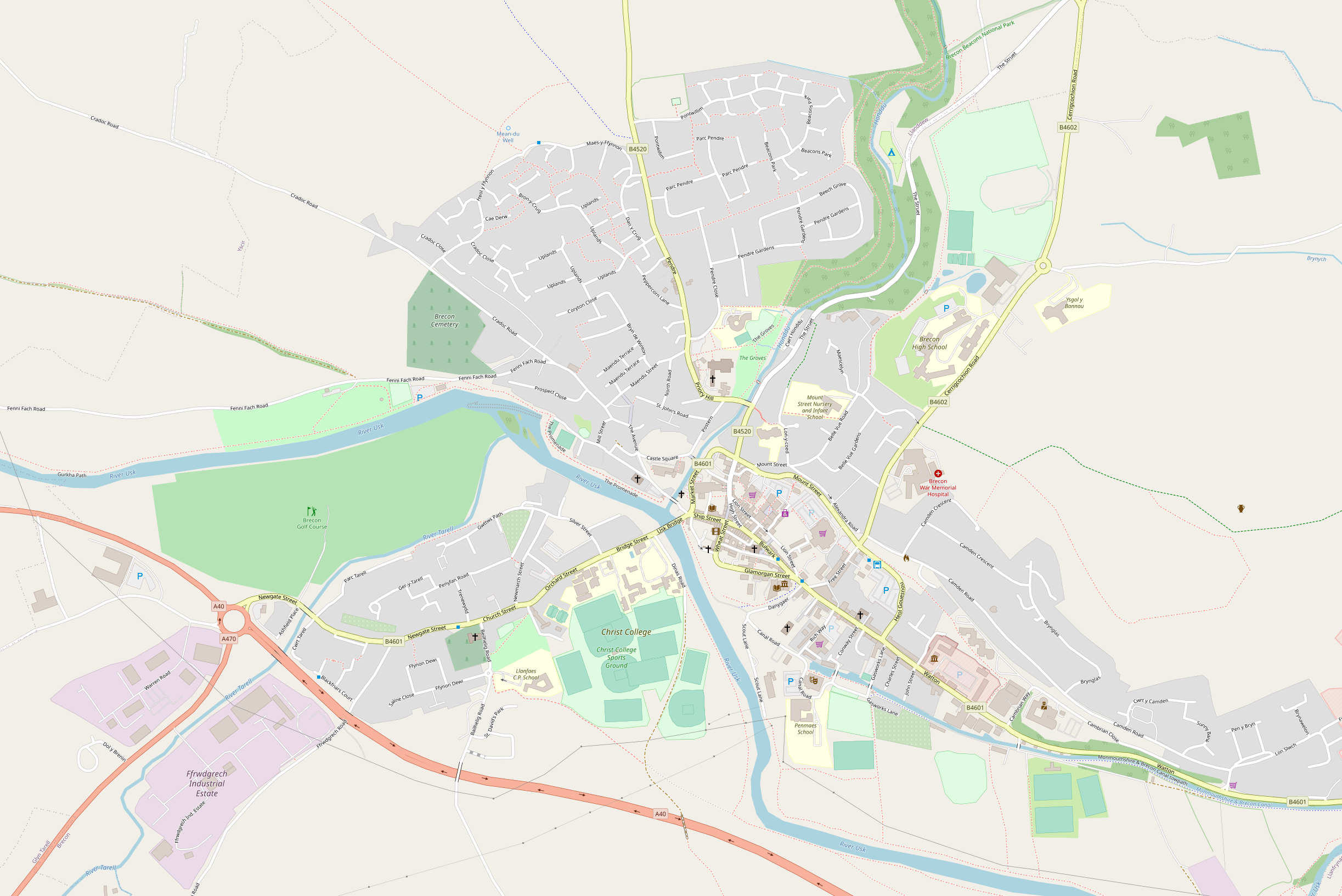
Locations of monastic houses in Brecon

Foundation	Image	Communities & provenance	Formal name or dedication & alternative names	On-line references & location
Brecon Friary ^{+}		Dominican Friars (under the Visitation of Oxford) founded before 1269; dissolved 1538; church later college chapel founded 1541 by Henry VIII		51°56′48″N 3°23′43″W
Brecon Cathedral Priory ^{+}		Benedictine monks dependent on Battle, Sussex; founded c.1110 by Bernard de Newmarch; dissolved 1538; granted to John ap Price (ap Rice) by Henry VIII; conventual church in use as diocesan cathedral founded 1923; extant	The Priory Church of Saint John the Evangelist, Brecon	51°57′04″N 3°23′31″W
Cwmhir Abbey		Cistercian monks daughter house of Whitland; (apparent attempted foundation at Tyfaenor 22 July 1143); founded here 1 August 1176 by Cadwallon ap Madog; dissolved 1537; granted to Walter Henley and John Williams 1545/6	The Abbey Church of the Blessed Virgin Mary, Cwmhir ____________________; Cwmhyr Abbey; Abbey-Cwmhir; Cwm Hir Abbey; Cumhire Abbey	52°19′47″N 3°23′15″W
Glascwm Clas		Celtic monks founded 6th century, believed by St David; parochial from c.1200?	Glascomb	
Glasbury Clas		Celtic monks founded 7th century, patron Cynidr (St Kenider); parochial from c.1088		
Llandinam Clas		Celtic monks founded 7th century by St Llonio; under an abbot until c.1150; parochial from after 1276?		
Llangorse Clas		Celtic monks founded early-7th century; parochial from before c.1100	St Paulinus	
Llanguric Clas		Celtic monks founded early-6th century by St Curig (Cyriac); clas until after 1175?		
Llanllugan Abbey		Cistercian nuns — from Strata Marcella founded 1188 (before 1236) by Maredudd ap Rhobert, Lord of Cydewain; dissolved 1536; granted to Sir Arthur Darcy	The Blessed Virgin Mary ____________________; Llanlugan Abbey	52°36′40″N 3°23′33″W
Llanrhaiadr ym mochnant Clas		Celtic monks founded 6th century by St Dogfan (Doewan); clas to after 1291		
Llansaintfraed in Elvel Priory		Cistercian nuns founded before 1174 by Enoch, first abbot of Strata Marcella; dissolved before 1186(?)	The Blessed Virgin Mary	
Llansilin Clas		Celtic monks foundation unknown; dissolved 13th century		
Meigod Clas		Celtic monks founded 6th century by St Tysilio; clas until 1170 or 1201		
St Harmon Clas		Celtic monks founded 6th century?, patron St Garmon; clas to after 1066?		
Strata Marcella, earlier site		Cistercian monks daughter house of Whitland founded 22 July 1170 by Owain Cyfeiliog (Owen Keveliog); transferred to new site (see immediately below) 10 July 1172 (Note: Strata Marcella — date of transfer to new site suggested by L. Janauschek, Originum Cisterciensium (1877))	The Blessed Virgin Mary	
Strata Marcella Abbey ^{$}		Cistercian monks daughter house of Whitland & Buildwas, Shropshire; (community founded at earlier site (see immediately above) 22 July 1170); transferred here 10 July 1172; dissolved 1536; granted to Rowland Howard and Thomas Dixton	The Blessed Virgin Mary ____________________; Ystrad Marchell; Pola	52°41′11″N 3°06′31″W
Tyfaenor Abbey (?)		Cistercian monks — from Whitland apparent unsuccessful attempted colonization; founded 22 July 1143 by Cadwathelan; trns to Cwmhir 1176	Dyvanner Abbey; Ty-faenor	

=== Rhondda Cynon Taf ===
Locations of monastic houses in Rhondda Cynon Taf

Foundation	Image	Communities & provenance	Formal name or dedication & alternative names	On-line references & location
Pendar Grange		Cistercian monks grange dependent on Margam; founded c.1147; dependent on Llantarnam after 1179		
Milton Camera		Knights' camera		51°32′08″N 3°27′55″W
Penrhys Grange		probably Cistercian monks grange dependent on Llantarnam possibly founded 1130/2 by Robert of Gloucester; dissolved 1538; masonry used in construction of later buildings	St Mary	51°38′40″N 3°25′52″W

=== Swansea ===
Locations of monastic houses in Swansea

Foundation	Image	Communities & provenance	Formal name or dedication & alternative names	On-line references & location
Bishopston Monastery		Benedictine monks dependent on Llandeilo Fawr; founded end of 6th century, patron St Teilo; dissolved 1107?; 13th century church built on site	St Teilo ____________________; Llandeilo Ferwallt	51°35′06″N 4°03′14″W
Llangenith Priory ^{+?}		Benedictine monks alien house: dependent on St-Taurinus, Evreux founded before 1123 by Henry, Earl of Warwick; dissolved c.1414; granted to the Warden and Fellows of All Souls College, Oxford; present parochial church of St Cenydd on site was probably the priory chapel	St Cenydd ____________________; Llan-genydd Priory; Llangennith; Llangenydd	51°35′59″N 4°16′12″W
Llanmadog		Knights Templar founded 1156, granted by Margaret, Countess of Warwick; manor later becoming a member of Garway, Herefordshire		
Llangyfelach Clas		Celtic monks founded 6th century (in the time of St David) (St Cyvelach); parochial from 13th century?		

=== Torfaen ===
Locations of monastic houses in Torfaen

Foundation	Image	Communities & provenance	Formal name or dedication & alternative names	On-line references & location
Llantarnam Abbey		Cistercian monks daughter house of Strata Florida founded 1179 by Hywel ap Iorwerth; community name was changed from Caerleon 1273, possibly indicating relocation to a new site; dissolved 1536 and leased to John Parker; later owned by the Morgan family; house built around cloister; re-built c.1830	The Abbey Church of the Blessed Virgin Mary, Llantarnam ____________________; Llanterna; Vallium; Dewma	51°37′51″N 2°59′45″W

=== Vale of Glamorgan ===
Foundation	Image	Communities & provenance	Formal name or dedication & alternative names	On-line references & location
Barry Island Monastery		Celtic monks cell? founded 6th–7th century		
Llancarfan Monastery		Celtic monks founded early 500s by St Cadoc; parochial from c.1100	Llancarvan Monastery	
Llandough Clas		Celtic monks founded 6th century by Abbot Docguinni (Docgwin); parochial from after 1107		
Llantwit-Major Monastery		Celtic monks monastery and school; founded c.478 (before 540?) by St Illtyd; continued to after 1100; granted to Tewkesbury, Gloucestershire	Llanilltud fawr Monastery	

=== Wrexham ===
Foundation	Image	Communities & provenance	Formal name or dedication & alternative names	On-line references & location
Bangor-is-y-coed Abbey		traditionally founded earlier than 6th century; abbey early 6th century		

== See also ==
- List of abbeys and priories
- List of monastic houses in England
- List of monastic houses in Scotland
- List of monastic houses on the Isle of Man
- List of monastic houses in Ireland
- Dissolution of the monasteries
- List of castles in Wales
- List of museums in Wales
- List of country houses in the United Kingdom
