= List of monastic houses in Shropshire =

Locations of monastic houses in Shropshire
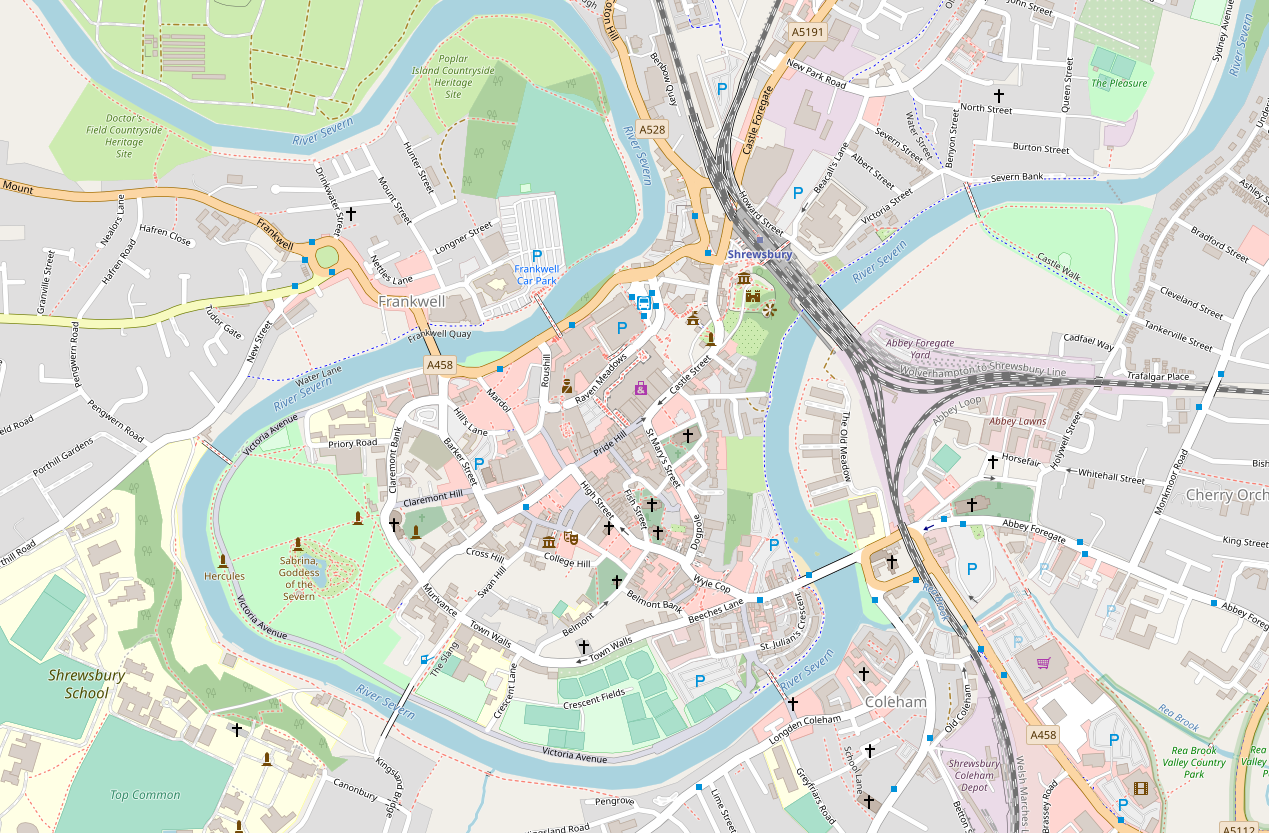
Locations of monastic houses in Shrewsbury

The following is a list of the monastic houses in Shropshire, England.

Alien houses are included, as are smaller establishments such as cells and notable monastic granges (particularly those with resident monks), and also camerae of the military orders of monks (Knights Templar and Knights Hospitaller). Monastic hospitals are included where they had the status or function of an abbey, priory, or preceptor/commandery.

Abbreviations and key

Status of remains
| Symbol | Status |
|---|---|
| None | Ruins |
| * | Current monastic function |
| ^{+} | Current non-monastic ecclesiastic function (including remains incorporated into later structure) |
| ^ | Current non-ecclesiastic function (including remains incorporated into later structure) or redundant intact structure |
| ^{$} | Remains limited to earthworks etc. |
| ^{#} | No identifiable trace of the monastic foundation remains |
| ^{~} | Exact site of monastic foundation unknown |
| ^{≈} | Identification ambiguous or confused |

Locations with names in italics indicate possible duplication (misidentification with another location) or non-existent foundations (either erroneous reference or proposed foundation never implemented) or ecclesiastical establishments with a monastic name but lacking actual monastic connection.

Trusteeship
| EH | English Heritage |
| LT | Landmark Trust |
| NT | National Trust |

| Foundation | Image | Communities & provenance | Formal name or dedication & alternative names | References & location |
|---|---|---|---|---|
| Alberbury Priory | | Augustinian Canons Regular — Arroasian dependent on Lilleshall; founded c.1221-6; Grandmontine monks alien house: dependent on Grandmont; refounded c.1230: confirmed by Fulk fitz Warin of Whittington, 1232; dissolved c.1441; bought by Henry Chichele, Archbishop of Canterbury; granted to All Souls College, Oxford by Henry VI, in use as a chantry chapel; dissolved 1547; conventual church converted into a farmhouse called 'White Abbey Farm' 1578; alterations 1857–8 | St Mary ____________________; White Abbey | 52°43′51″N 2°55′37″W |
| Beth centuryote | | Augustinian Canons Regular dependent on Haughmond; farm and chapel | | |
| Bridgnorth Greyfriars | | Franciscan Friars Minor, Conventual (under the Custody of Worcester) founded 1244; dissolved 1538 | | 52°32′13″N 2°24′58″W |
| Bromfield Priory ^{+} | | secular canons collegiate founded before 1061; Benedictine monks cell dependent on Gloucester, Gloucestershire; founded 1155; dissolved 1540; granted to Charles Fox; church now in parochial use | St Mary, Virgin | 52°23′12″N 2°45′44″W |
| Buildwas Abbey | | Savignac monks — from Savigny dependent on Savigny; founded 8 August 1135; Cistercian monks orders merged 1147; dissolved 1535 (1536) part of monastic buildings incorporated into a private house; (EH) | The Abbey Church of St Mary and St Chad, Buildwas ____________________; Bildewas Abbey | 52°38′07″N 2°31′43″W |
| Chirbury Priory | | Augustinian Canons Regular — from Snead founded c.1190 by Robert de Buthlers, Lord of Montgomery; canons arrived c.1195; dissolved 1536; granted Edward Hampton 1545/6 | The Priory Church of Saint Michael, Chirbury | 52°34′46″N 3°05′28″W |
| Church Preen Priory | | Cluniac monks alien house: dependent on Wenlock; founded after 1150; cell 1384; dissolved before 1539 | St John the Baptist ____________________; Preen Priory | 52°34′44″N 2°40′31″W |
| Donnington Wood Abbey | | Augustinian Canons Regular — Arroasian — from Dorchester, Oxfordshire; (community founded at Lizard c.1143); transferred from Lizard c.1144; dissolved c.1148; transferred to new site at Lilleshall | | 52°39′05″N 2°16′56″W |
| Emstrey | | possible Saxon minster | Eiminstre | |
| Halston Preceptory | | possible Knights Templar (evidence lacking); Knights Hospitaller refounded before 1221 (between 1165 and 1187) by Roger de Powys, Lord of Whittington; dissolved before 1540; granted to William Horne 1562/3 | | 52°52′30″N 2°59′02″W |
| Hatton Grange | | Cistercian monks grange, dependent on Buildwas; founded 1227; dissolved before 1540 | | |
| Haughmond Abbey | | Augustinian Canons Regular priory? founded c.1110 (1130-8) by William fitz Alan of Clun; Augustinian Canons Regular — Arroasian(?) priory; before 1130–5; purportedly raised to abbey status c.1155?; listed under Augustinian general chapter c.1160-80; dissolved 9 September 1539; granted to Edward Littleton (died 1558) 1540/1; (EH) | The Abbey Church of St John the Evangelist, Haughmond ____________________; Haghmon Priory | 52°43′58″N 2°40′47″W |
| Lilleshall Abbey | | Augustinian Canons Regular — Arroasian — from Dorchester, Oxfordshire, via Lizard (community founded at Lizard c.1143); transferred from Donnington Wood c.1148; dissolved 1538; granted to James Leveson 1539/40; (EH) | The Blessed Virgin Mary ____________________; Lilleshull Priory | 52°43′42″N 2°23′52″W |
| Lizard Abbey | | Augustinian Canons Regular — from Dorchester, Oxfordshire founded c.1143; transferred to new site at Donnington Wood c.1144; retained for use as grange | | 52°41′18″N 2°18′55″W |
| Ludlow Austin Friars | | Augustinian Friars (under the Limit of Lincoln) founded 1254; built c.1282; dissolved 1538; granted to George Cotton and William Man | | 52°22′02″N 2°42′41″W |
| Ludlow Whitefriars | | Carmelite Friars founded 1350 (1349) by Lawrence of Ludlow; dissolved 1538; granted to Richard Hacket and Thomas Trentham 1559/60 | | 52°22′15″N 2°43′16″W |
| Lydley Keys Preceptory | | Knights Templar founded c.1155-60; dissolved 1308–12 | Lydley Preceptory | |
| Minsterley | | possible Saxon minster | | |
| Morville Priory | | collegiate church before 1066; Benedictine monks priory cell dependent on Shrewsbury; founded 1138 by the Earl of Shrewsbury, collegiate church granted to Shrewsbury as a cell by Robert, Bishop of Hereford; dissolved 1540; granted to Henry Lord Lisle 1545/6 | St Gregory ____________________; Morfield Priory | 52°32′31″N 2°29′19″W |
| Ratlinghope Priory | | Augustinian Canons Regular priory cell founded before 1200; Augustinian Canons Regular — Victorine priory cell dependent on Wigmore, Herefordshire; before 1209; dissolved 1538; granted to Robert Long 1545/6 | St Giles ____________________; Ratlingcope Priory | 52°34′00″N 2°52′57″W |
| Shrewsbury Abbey ^{+} | | Benedictine monks founded 1083-6 (c.1080) by Roger de Montgomery, Earl of Arundel; dissolved 1540; granted to Edward Watson and Henry Herdson 1541/2; part of church now in parochial use | The Abbey Church of Saint Peter and Saint Paul, Shrewsbury (nave dedicated to The Holy Cross) | 52°42′27″N 2°44′37″W |
| Shrewsbury Austin Friars, earlier site | | Augustinian Friars founded c.1255 by the Stafford family: Henry III granted land to 'poor brethren of Cowlane' (possible Austin Friars) June 1254; transferred to new site (see immediately below) 1290–8 | | |
| Shrewsbury Austin Friars | | Augustinian Friars (under the Limit of Lincoln) community founded at earlier site (see immediately above) c.1255; transferred here 1290–1298; dissolved 1538; granted to Richard Andrews and Nicholas Temple 1543/4 | | 52°42′32″N 2°45′37″W |
| Shrewsbury Blackfriars | | Dominican Friars (under the Visitation of Oxford) founded before 1232 by Lady Genevile; dissolved 1539; granted to Richard Andrews and Nicholas Temple 1543/4 | | 52°42′32″N 2°45′00″W |
| Shrewsbury Greyfriars | | Franciscan Friars Minor, Conventual (under the Custody of Worcester) founded 1245-6 by Hawise, Countess of Powys; dissolved 1538; granted to Richard Andrews and Nicholas Temple 1543/4 | | 52°42′18″N 2°44′56″W |
| Snead Priory | | Augustinian Canons Regular founded c.1190; transferred to Chirbury c.1195 | | 52°30′45″N 3°01′05″W |
| Stanton Long Camera | | Knights Templar camera or grange; founded c.1221 (before 1228); dissolved 1308–12 | | 52°30′22″N 2°38′06″W |
| Stitt Cell | | Augustinian Canons Regular (?)cell dependent on Haughmond — evidence lacking | | 52°34′51″N 2°52′57″W |
| Wenlock Nunnery | | Saxon nuns founded c.680 by Merwald, King of West Mercia (or his daughter St Milburga); ruined; Cluniac house built on site (see immediately below) | | 52°35′50″N 2°33′19″W |
| Wenlock Priory | | possible secular canons — minster founded c.1050: built by Earl Leofric; Cluniac monks alien house: dependent on La Charité: monks invited by Roger de Montgomery, Earl of Shrewsbury, built on site of ruined Saxon nunnery (see immediately above); became denizen: independent from 1395; dissolved 26 January 1540; granted to Augustino de Augustinis 1544/5; (EH) | The Priory Church of Saint Michael and Saint Milburga, Wenlock ____________________; Much Wenlock Priory | 52°35′50″N 2°33′19″W |
| Whitchurch | | possibly Saxon minster at Album Monasterium | | |
| White Ladies Priory | | Augustinian Canonesses founded c.1199(?); dissolved 1538(?): granted to William Whorwood 1539/40; house built on site (EH) | St Leonard ____________________; Brewood White Ladies Priory; Brewood Priory | 52°39′57″N 2°15′30″W |
| Wombridge Priory | | Augustinian Canons Regular transferred from Dodlinch, Somerset before? 1226; founded 1130-5 by William de Hadley; dissolved 1536; granted to James Leveson 1539/40; conventual church continued in parochial use until mid-17th century when ruinous; Lady Chapel in use until destroyed in a storm 1756; new parish church built, rebuilt 19th century, in use as current parish church | The Holy Trinity, St Mary Virgin, and St Thomas Martyr ____________________; Wombride Priory | 52°42′05″N 2°27′31″W |
| Woodhouse Austin Friars | | Augustinian Friars (under the Limit of Lincoln) founded c.1250: granted by the Turberviles (Tubervilles); dissolved August 1538; granted to Thomas Reeves and George Cotton | | 52°23′29″N 2°31′12″W |

== See also ==
- List of monastic houses in England
- List of monastic houses in Wales

== Sources ==
Bibliography

- Binns, Alison (1989) Studies in the History of Medieval Religion 1: Dedications of Monastic Houses in England and Wales 1066–1216, Boydell
- Cobbett, William (1868) List of Abbeys, Priories, Nunneries, Hospitals, And Other Religious Foundations in England and Wales and in Ireland, Confiscated, Seized On, or Alienated by the Protestant "Reformation" Sovereigns and Parliaments
- Knowles, David & Hadcock, R. Neville (1971). Medieval Religious Houses England & Wales. Longman. ISBN 0582112303.
- Morris, Richard (1979) Cathedrals and Abbeys of England and Wales, J. M. Dent & Sons Ltd.
- Thorold, Henry (1986) Collins Guide to Cathedrals, Abbeys and Priories of England and Wales, Collins
- Thorold, Henry (1993) Collins Guide to the Ruined Abbeys of England, Wales and Scotland, Collins
- Wright, Geoffrey N., (2004) Discovering Abbeys and Priories, Shire Publications Ltd.
- English Cathedrals and Abbeys, Illustrated, Odhams Press Ltd.
- Map of Monastic Britain, South Sheet, Ordnance Survey, 2nd edition, 1954
