= Troarn Abbey =

Abbey in Calvados, France

Coordinates: 49°10′54″N 0°10′39″W

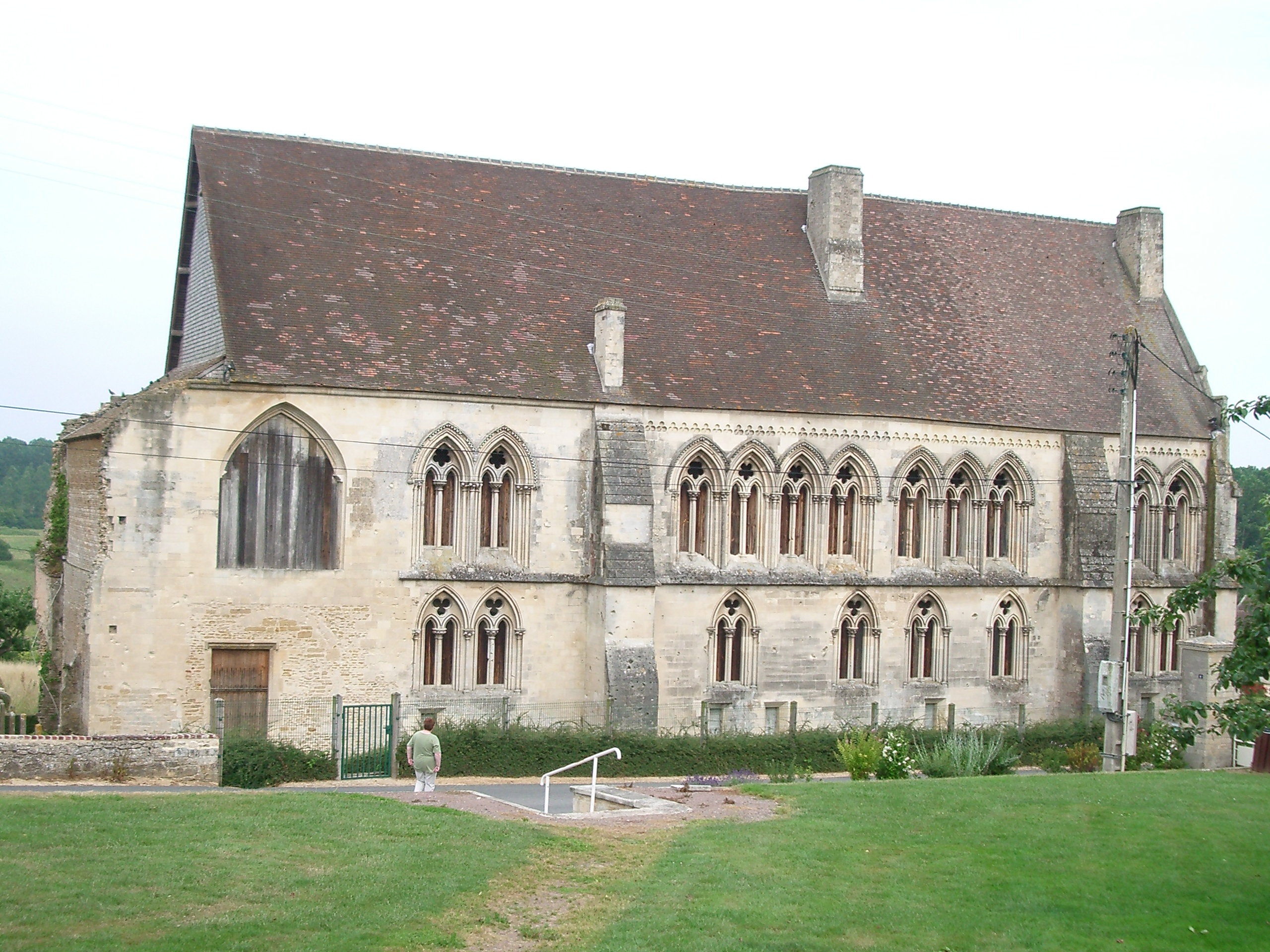
Remains of the abbey

Troarn Abbey or Abbey Saint-Martin de Troarn (French: Abbaye Saint-Martin de Troarn) was a Benedictine abbey in the French town of Troarn, now in the Calvados department of Lower Normandy. It was dedicated to Martin of Tours and founded by Roger I of Montgomery using twelve monks from Fécamp Abbey in 1022, as a satellite of that house. Around 1050 Roger II of Montgommery replaced this establishment with an independent Benedictine monastery. Its first church was dedicated in 1059. Roger II granted the monastery lands around Troarn, including the marshes and a series of parish churches, whilst his wife Mabille of Bellême granted it all the parish churches in Séez and William I of England added everything he had granted Mabille in England.

Between the Norman conquest of England and 1086 it was granted Horsley Priory in Gloucestershire as a satellite of its own; this was held until 1260, when it was exchanged with Bruton Priory in Somerset for lands in Normandy. Around 1100, the abbey received additional estates by charter from William of Évreux and his wife, Helvise of Nevers. Troarn became the second most important abbey in the Diocese of Bayeux after the Abbey of Saint-Étienne in Caen. It housed forty monks by the 13th century, who played a major part in reclaiming the Dives marshes and developing the pastures of the Auge valley and the vines in the countryside around Caen. It was sold by the French Revolutionary government in 1792 and the church and cloister were demolished. It was classed as a historic monument on 30 April 1921.

== Burials ==
- Mabel de Bellême
