= Saint-Sylvestre-de-Cormeilles =

- Commune
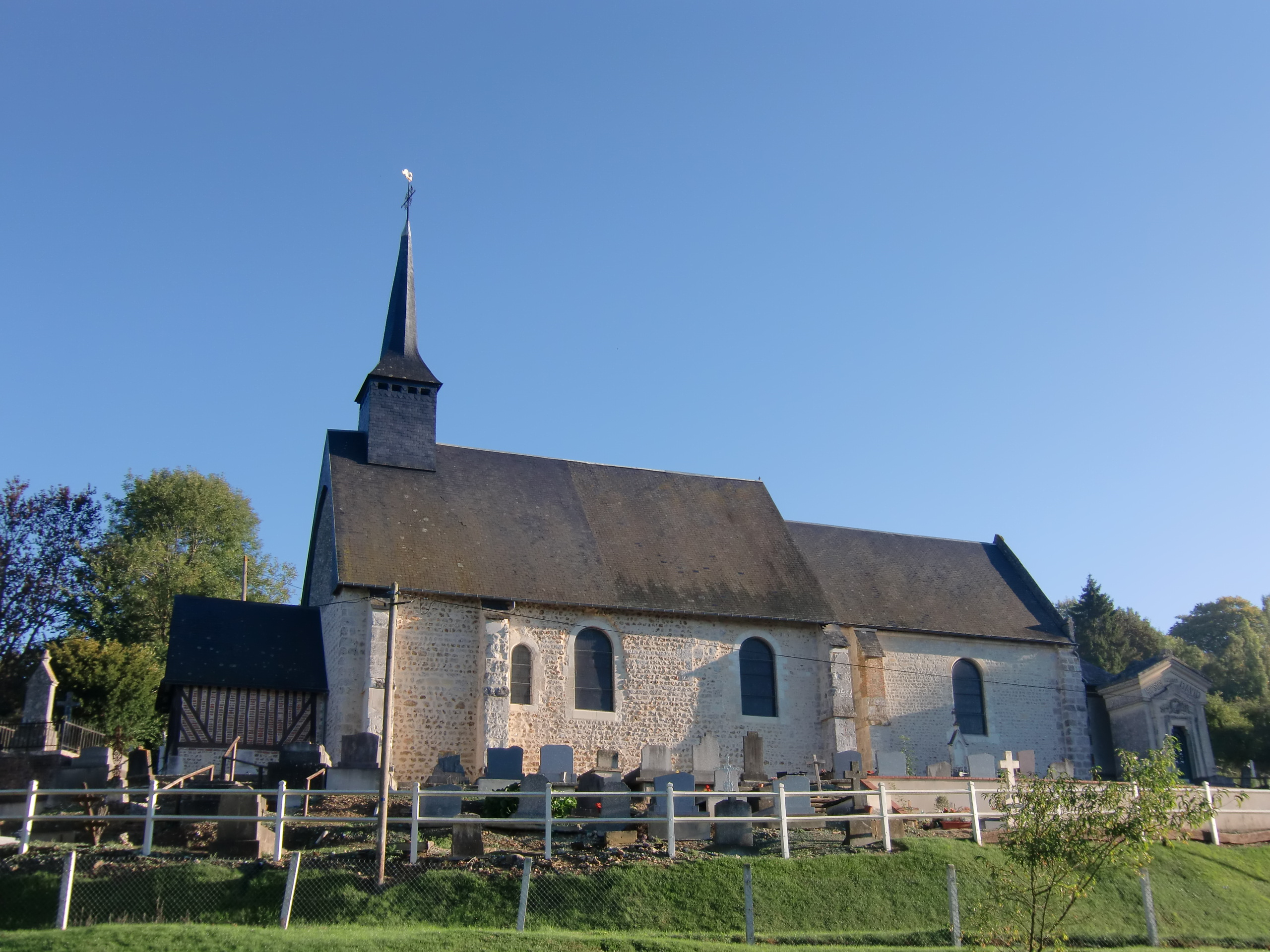
- The church in Saint-Sylvestre-de-Cormeilles
- Location of Saint-Sylvestre-de-Cormeilles
- Location within France Location within Normandy
- Coordinates: 49°14′44″N 0°25′46″E
- Country: France
- Region: Normandy
- Department: Eure
- Arrondissement: Bernay
- Canton: Beuzeville
- Intercommunality: Lieuvin Pays d'Auge

Government
  - Mayor (2020–2026): Jean-Pierre Capon
- Area^{1}: 9.5 km^{2} (3.7 sq mi)
- Elevation: 150 m (490 ft)
- Highest elevation: 164 m (538 ft)
- Lowest elevation: 69 m (226 ft)
- Population (2023): 223
  - Density: 23/km^{2} (61/sq mi)
- Time zone: UTC+01:00 (CET)
  - Summer (DST): UTC+02:00 (CEST)
- INSEE/Postal code: 27605 /27260
- ^{1} French Land Register data, which excludes lakes, ponds, glaciers > 1 km^{2} (0.386 sq mi or 247 acres) and river estuaries.

Saint-Sylvestre-de-Cormeilles (French pronunciation: [sɛ̃ silvɛstʁ də kɔʁmɛj], literally Saint-Sylvestre of Cormeilles) is a commune in the Eure department in Normandy in north-western France.

== Population ==
Historical population
Year	Pop.	±% p.a.
1968	234	—
1975	190	−2.93%
1982	178	−0.93%
1990	194	+1.08%
1999	173	−1.26%
2007	199	+1.77%
2012	216	+1.65%
2017	253	+3.21%
2023	223	−2.08%
Source: INSEE

== See also ==
- Communes of the Eure department
