= Poulton, Gloucestershire =

Village in Gloucestershire, England

Coordinates: 51.709°N 1.854°W

Poulton
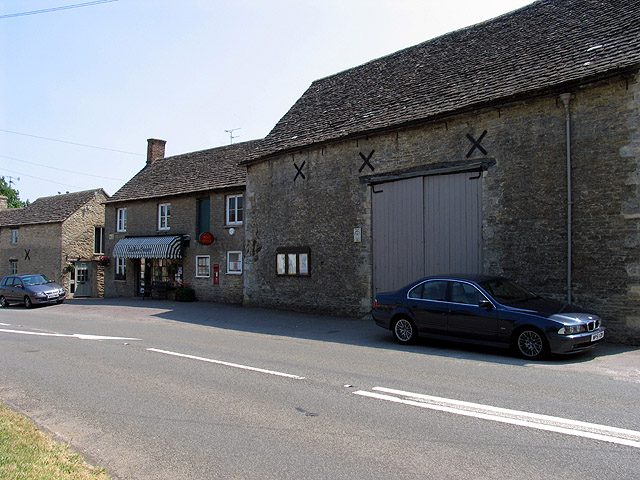

- Location within Gloucestershire
- Population: 408 (2011 Census)
  - London: 90 mi (140 km) E
- Civil parish: Poulton
- District: Cotswold
- Shire county: Gloucestershire
- Region: South West
- Country: England
- Sovereign state: United Kingdom
- Post town: Cirencester
- Postcode district: GL7
- Dialling code: 01285
- Police: Gloucestershire
- Fire: Gloucestershire
- Ambulance: South Western
- UK Parliament: South Cotswolds
- Website: www.poultonvillage.co.uk

Poulton is a village and civil parish in the English county of Gloucestershire, approximately 24 miles (39 km) to the south-east of Gloucester. It lies in the south of the Cotswolds, an Area of Outstanding Natural Beauty. In the 2001 United Kingdom census, the parish had a population of 398, increasing to 408 at the 2011 census.

== History ==
Poulton was listed as Poltone in the Domesday Book of 1086. Historically, the village was part of the county of Wiltshire and for centuries was — physically detached from Wiltshire — an enclave in Gloucestershire. Under the Counties (Detached Parts) Act 1844, Poulton finally became part of Gloucestershire.

There was a parish church at Poulton by at least 1337, when the lord of the manor, Sir Thomas Seymour, endowed it with a chantry. In 1348, Seymour built what became the Priory of St Mary. From 1539, with the Dissolution of the Monasteries, the priory was used as Poulton's parish church. It was demolished in 1873. The current parish church, dedicated to St Michael and All Angels, was built in 1873 by William Butterfield.

== Governance ==
Poulton is part of the Hampton ward of the Cotswold district, currently represented by Councillor Lisa Spivey, a member of the Liberal Democrats. Poulton is part of the constituency of North Cotswolds, currently represented at parliament by Conservative Member of Parliament (MP) Geoffrey Clifton-Brown. It was part of the South West England constituency of the European Parliament prior to Britain leaving the European Union in January 2020.
