= Limebrook Priory =

Priory in Lingen, Herefordshire, England

Coordinates: 52.2885°N 2.9182°W

Limebrook Priory was a priory in Lingen, Herefordshire, England at grid reference SO37386604.

== History ==
=== Origins ===
Situated in Lingen, Herefordshire, Limebrook Priory was founded in or before the reign of Richard I (1189–99), either by Rob de Lingen or one of the Mortimers. It may have originally been Benedictine, but it was tenanted by Augustinian nuns during the time of Bishop Booth (1516–35), and lasted until its suppression in 1539.

=== Remains ===
All that remains is a single ruined building, possibly dating from the 13th century, on an east–west alignment, with walls of local sandstone rubble that were originally dressed. The south wall includes three single-light windows and the remains of a doorway, while part of a second doorway remains in the north wall. Most of that end and the east wall have been destroyed, with only the west end and the south wall remaining, up to 15 feet in height.

There are extensive foundation mounds in the field to the east of the priory. The remains of walls of one building can be traced by footings, while a second range of buildings is visible under turf adjacent to a cottage garden. Between the two ranges is a relatively flat area. An adjacent 16th-century timber-framed cottage incorporates material from the Priory. An unusual curve in its south wall may also indicate an incorporated Priory building.

A hedge-bank of asarabacca grows for some 40 yards on the west slopes near the priory. This was probably introduced by the nuns as it was believed to cure diseases of the ear.

A fishpond located immediately to the south of the ruins may also be associated with the priory.
