= Kinsham Grange =

Possible site of a priory in Herefordshire, England

Coordinates: 52.281°N 2.9089°W

Kinsham Grange may have been a priory near the River Lugg in Herefordshire, England at grid reference SO380652. It now seems likely that an error by John Tanner in 1744 confused this site with one at Great Limber in Lincolnshire and there was never a priory here.
