= Upleadon Preceptory =

Priory in Herefordshire, England

Coordinates: 52.0812°N 2.4889°W

Upleadon Preceptory was a priory in Herefordshire, England at grid reference SO66504270.
