= Quenington Preceptory =

Preceptory in Gloucestershire, England

Coordinates: 51.734291°N 1.786995°W

Quenington Preceptory was a preceptory of the Knights Hospitaller in Quenington, Gloucestershire, England. The manor of Quenington was given by Agnes de Lucy and her daughter Sibilla to the order, who established the preceptory in 1193, adding to it the manor of Wishanger, the gift of Asculf Musard. By 1338 the Hospitallers had also acquired the churches of Lower Guiting, Southrop, Down Ampney and Siddington. The preceptory, which in the interim had taken over the possessions of the preceptory of Clanfield in Oxfordshire as well, was surrendered to the Crown in 1540 as part of the possessions of Clerkenwell Priory.
