= Kingswood Abbey =

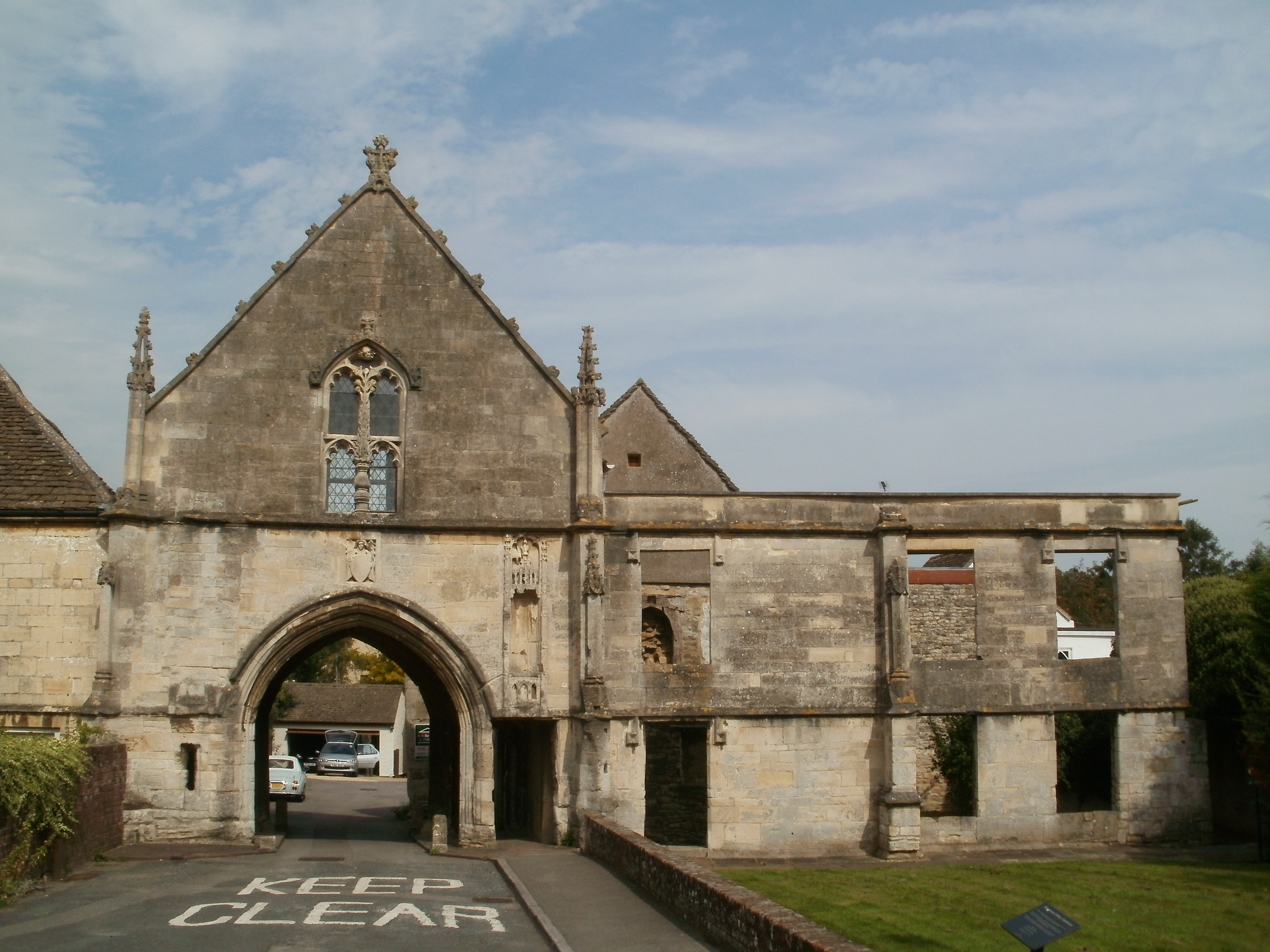
- The gatehouse of the abbey

- Location within Gloucestershire
- 51°37′35″N 2°22′00″W
- Type: Abbey
- Location: Kingswood, Stroud District
- OS grid reference: ST 74705 92035

History
- Built: 1139

Site notes
- Area: Gloucestershire
- Owner: English Heritage

Scheduled monument
- Official name: Kingswood Abbey gate
- Reference no.: 1004872

Listed Building – Grade I
- Official name: Abbey gatehouse and adjoining wall to east
- Designated: 23 June 1952
- Reference no.: 1238022

Kingswood Abbey was a Cistercian abbey, located in the village of Kingswood near Wotton-under-Edge, Gloucestershire, England. The abbey was demolished during the Dissolution of the Monasteries, and all that remains is the gatehouse, a Grade I listed building. Through the gatehouse arch are a few houses and the small village primary school of Kingswood.

== History ==
Kingswood Abbey was founded in 1139 by William of Berkeley, provost of Berkeley, in accordance with the wishes of his late uncle, Roger II of Berkeley, and colonised from the Cistercian house at Tintern, Monmouthshire. The founding family were the feudal barons of Dursley, who intermarried later with the progeny of Robert Fitzharding (d.1170), 1st feudal baron of Berkeley Castle.

In the mid-12th century the abbot and all but a few monks removed, first to Hazleton Abbey and then, for want of water at that site, to Tetbury, Kingswood becoming a grange until the return of the community to "Mireford" in Kingswood, close to the earlier site. According to the taxation of Pope Nicholas IV in 1291, annual spiritualities and temporalities came to £54 1s 6d, and at the time of the Dissolution of the Monasteries the abbey was variously valued at about £245.

The replacement of the old abbot by a royal appointee in 1517 occasioned a riot in which the monks were joined by their neighbours: the displeasure of Edward Stafford, 3rd Duke of Buckingham, effected the restoration of order. Henry VIII leased the monastery estate to the courtier Sir Nicholas Poyntz for a period of 21 years, and in 1559 Elizabeth granted it to Sir John Thynne, the builder of Longleat.

The cellarer's and bursar's accounts that survive for 1240-41 (Cellarer's accounts) and 1241-2 (Bursar's accounts) may well be the earliest accounts of their kind now in existence, but all that survives at the site today is the early 16th-century abbey gatehouse (illustration), which is under the care of English Heritage.

The abbey and its church were so efficiently demolished that their precise location is unknown. The gatehouse is noteworthy for its embellishments, with gable ridge decorations, a pair of niches with statues (only one remains), pinnacles and fine windows with carved mullions. The lodging to the right is merely a facade, but that to the left is still inhabited.

Calcot Manor, a few miles to the northeast, was built as a tithe barn by the monks of the abbey. Forty-eight original charters of Kingswood Abbey, covering the years 1225 to 1444 and preserved in antiquarian collections, last went on sale at Sotheby's in 1945.

== Burials ==
- Elizabeth Berkeley, Countess of Warwick

== Bibliography ==
- Victoria County History, Gloucestershire, Vol.2, 1907, Houses of Cistercian monks: The Abbey of Kingswood, pp. 99–101
- Barkly, H. "The Earlier House of Berkeley" in Transactions of the Bristol and Gloucestershire Archaeological Society, Vol. 8, 1883-84' esp. pp 199–201
- Archives Hub profile: Kingswood Abbey
