= Hazleton Abbey =

Abbey in Gloucestershire, England

Coordinates: 51.858°N 1.886°W

Hazleton Abbey was an abbey at Hazleton Manor Farm, just outside Rodmarton in Gloucestershire, England.

It was formed in the 12th century. Monks from Kingswood Abbey bought the land after King Stephen had confiscated it from Reginald de Waleric. Ownership was disputed and Reginald de Waleric was ordered to found a Cistercian Abbey by the Pope and allowed the monks to return. A shortage of water meant that they later moved to Tetbury. It became crown land after the dissolution of the monasteries.

The former Abbey barn survives.

Hazelton Manor was built on the site in the 16th century.
