= Brimpsfield Priory =

Monastery in Gloucestershire, England

Coordinates: 51.814442°N 2.086222°W

Brimpsfield Priory was a Benedictine monastic foundation in Brimpsfield, Gloucestershire, England, a cell or grange of the Abbey of Saint-Wandrille in Normandy. It was almost certainly founded between 1086 and 1100 by a member of the Giffard family, as lords of Brimpsfield and endowed with some demesne tithes. The advowson of the church was in the hands of the abbey by 1317. The Crown presented to the living during war with France.

As an alien priory it was confiscated by Henry V under the Act of 1414. Henry VI gave it to Eton College in 1441. Edward IV confirmed the gift in 1467 but in 1474 gave it to the dean and chapter of Windsor.

The priory was located adjoining the northern side of the churchyard. According to Rudder, it was thought to have been an elegant building after windows of polished marble were dug up there in the early 18th century.
