= Saint-Pierre-de-Cormeilles =

- Commune
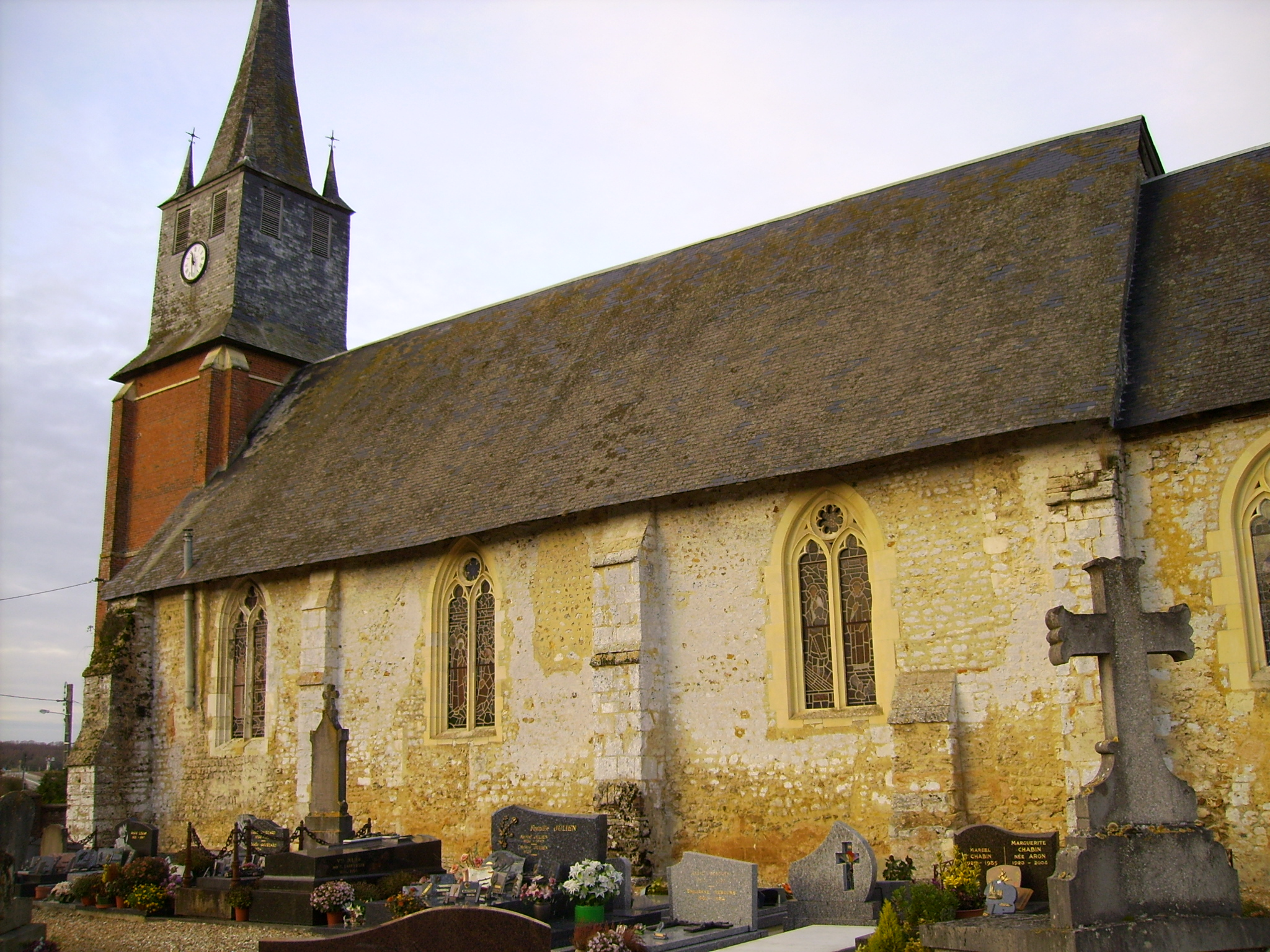
- The church in Saint-Pierre-de-Cormeilles
- Location of Saint-Pierre-de-Cormeilles
- Location within France Location within Normandy
- Coordinates: 49°14′16″N 0°23′06″E
- Country: France
- Region: Normandy
- Department: Eure
- Arrondissement: Bernay
- Canton: Beuzeville

Government
  - Mayor (2020–2026): Jacky Lesaulnier
- Area^{1}: 17.29 km^{2} (6.68 sq mi)
- Elevation: 90 m (300 ft)
- Highest elevation: 168 m (551 ft)
- Lowest elevation: 55 m (180 ft)
- Population (2023): 592
  - Density: 34.2/km^{2} (88.7/sq mi)
- Time zone: UTC+01:00 (CET)
  - Summer (DST): UTC+02:00 (CEST)
- INSEE/Postal code: 27591 /27260
- ^{1} French Land Register data, which excludes lakes, ponds, glaciers > 1 km^{2} (0.386 sq mi or 247 acres) and river estuaries.

Saint-Pierre-de-Cormeilles (French pronunciation: [sɛ̃ pjɛʁ də kɔʁmɛj], literally Saint-Pierre of Cormeilles) is a commune in the Eure department in Normandy in north-western France.

== Population ==
Historical population
Year	Pop.	±% p.a.
1968	560	—
1975	496	−1.72%
1982	478	−0.53%
1990	523	+1.13%
1999	577	+1.10%
2007	596	+0.41%
2012	617	+0.69%
2017	609	−0.26%
2023	592	−0.47%
Source: INSEE

== See also ==
- Communes of the Eure department
