= Sutton Camera =

Priory in Herefordshire, England

Coordinates: 52.1083°N 2.6915°W

Sutton Camera was a priory in Herefordshire, England at grid reference SO52654582.
