= Monkland Priory =

Priory in Monkland, Herefordshire, England

Coordinates: 52.2143°N 2.7899°W

Monkland Priory was a priory in Monkland, Herefordshire, England at grid reference SO46045768.
