= Titley Priory =

Former priory in Herefordshire

Coordinates: 52.2347°N 2.9818°W

Titley Priory was a priory near Titley in Herefordshire, England at grid reference SO32966011.
