= Minchinhampton Priory =

Priory in Gloucestershire, England

Coordinates: 51.7057°N 2.1881°W

Minchinhampton Priory was a priory in Gloucestershire, England.

After the Norman Conquest the manor of Minchinhampton was granted to the Benedictine nuns of Caen Abbey and later to Syon Abbey. John Leland says that there may have been a site for nuns but other authors dispute this.
