= Horsley Priory =

Former priory in Gloucestershire, England

Coordinates: 51.680545°N 2.235755°W

- Interactive map of Horsley Priory

Monastery information
- Order: Benedictine
- Established: before 1086
- Disestablished: before 1380
- Mother house: Troarn Abbey
- Diocese: Diocese of Gloucester

Site
- Location: Horsley, Gloucestershire, England
- Public access: No

Horsley Priory was a medieval, monastic house in Gloucestershire, England.

Goda owned an estate at Horsley, in 1066. It was granted to Troarn Abbey by Roger de Montgomery before 1086. The original grant was said to provide for a prior, a monk, and a parish chaplain to reside at Horsley. From those provisions emerged the cell called Horsley Priory. Troarn Abbey exchanged the priory with Bruton Priory for lands in Normandy in 1260. The priory of Horsley ceased to exist before 1380. Horsley manor was retained by Bruton Priory, until the Dissolution of the Monasteries in 1539. In 1541, Horsley was granted to Thomas Seymour.

== Priors of Horsley ==
- Stephen, 1262, (fn. 28) occurs 1269
- Walter de Horwood, occurs 1271
- Richard de la Grave, 1292
- William, 1298
- William de Milverton, ob. 1329
- Laurence de Haustede, 1329
- Henry de Lisle, 1335 resigned 1357 (fn. 36)
- Richard de Holt, 1357 resigned 1363 (fn. 38)
- William Cary, 1363
