= Poulton Priory =

Priory in Poulton, England

- Location within Gloucestershire

Monastery information
- Full name: Priory of St Mary
- Order: Gilbertine
- Established: 1350
- Disestablished: 1539

People
- Founder: Thomas Seymour

Site
- Location: Poulton, Gloucestershire
- Coordinates: 51.698975°N 1.863894°W

Poulton Priory or the Priory of St Mary was a Gilbertine priory in Poulton, Gloucestershire, England. It was founded as a chantry chapel in 1337 by Sir Thomas Seymour and became a house of Gilbertine canons in 1350. From 1539, with the Dissolution of the Monasteries, the priory was used as the parish church for Poulton. It was demolished in 1873.

A Tudor style mansion was built on the site by Sir Arthur Blomfield for the Marshall family c. 1897. It was later owned by James Joicey and Major Alexander Black-Mitchell. In World War II, it was used as a children's hospital.
