= Wotton under Edge Friary =

Friary in Wotton-under-Edge, England

Coordinates: 51.6384°N 2.3518°W

Wotton under Edge Friary was a friary of the Crutched Friars in Wotton-under-Edge, Gloucestershire, England.

It was founded in 1347.
