= Cormeilles, Eure =

Cormeilles
- Commune
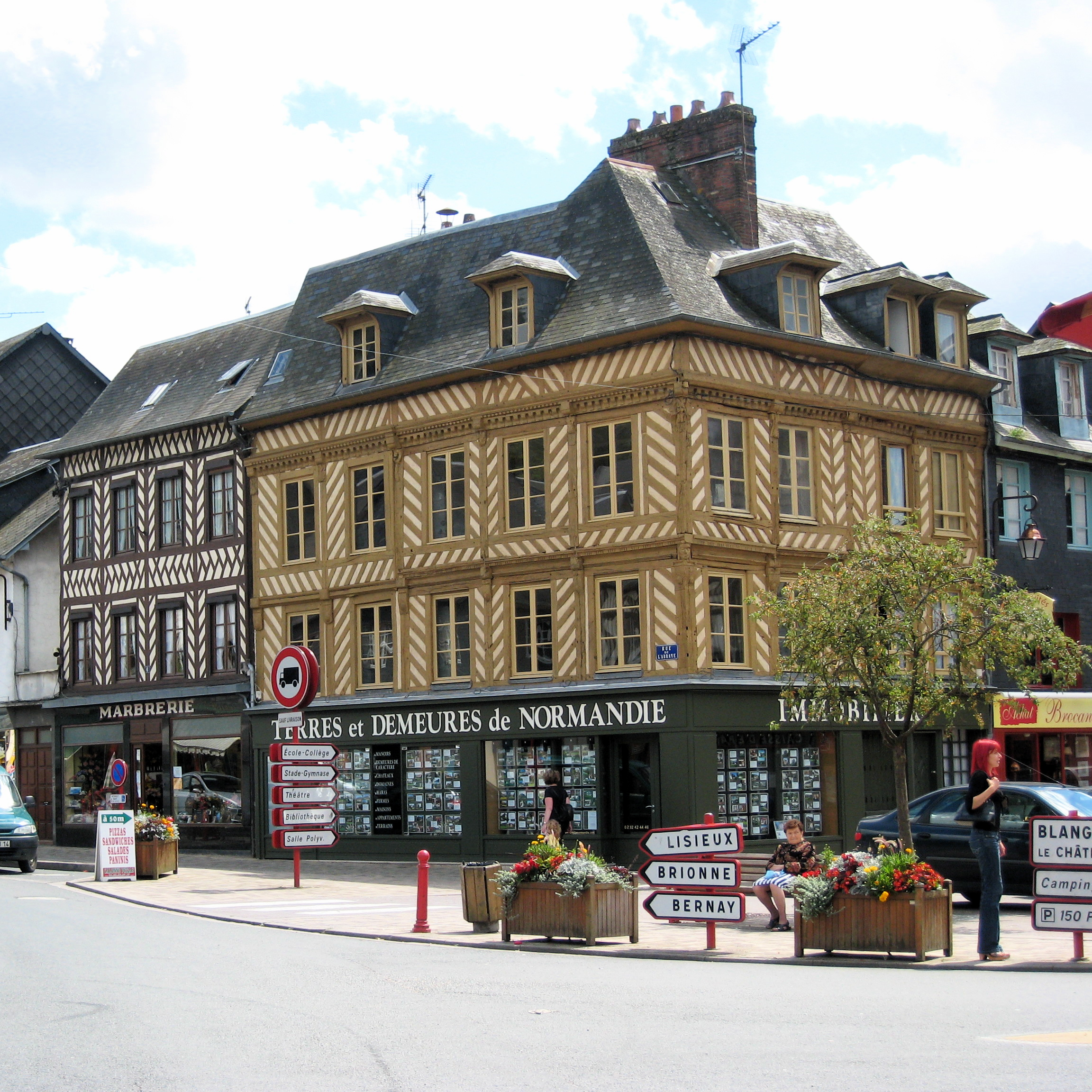
- Main square

- Coat of arms
- Location of Cormeilles
- Location within France Location within Normandy
- Coordinates: 49°14′55″N 0°22′43″E
- Country: France
- Region: Normandy
- Department: Eure
- Arrondissement: Bernay
- Canton: Beuzeville

Government
  - Mayor (2020–2026): Pascal Cauche
- Area^{1}: 3.05 km^{2} (1.18 sq mi)
- Elevation: 67 m (220 ft)
- Highest elevation: 151 m (495 ft)
- Lowest elevation: 59 m (194 ft)
- Population (2023): 1,105
  - Density: 362/km^{2} (938/sq mi)
- Time zone: UTC+01:00 (CET)
  - Summer (DST): UTC+02:00 (CEST)
- INSEE/Postal code: 27170 /27260
- ^{1} French Land Register data, which excludes lakes, ponds, glaciers > 1 km^{2} (0.386 sq mi or 247 acres) and river estuaries.

Cormeilles (French pronunciation: [kɔʁmɛj]) is a commune located in the Eure department in the Normandy region of north-western France.

== Population ==
The inhabitants are called Cormeillais in French.

Historical population
Year	Pop.	±% p.a.
1968	1,143	—
1975	1,140	−0.04%
1982	1,129	−0.14%
1990	1,069	−0.68%
1999	1,191	+1.21%
2007	1,203	+0.13%
2012	1,146	−0.97%
2017	1,161	+0.26%
2023	1,105	−0.82%
Source: INSEE

== Geography ==
Cormeilles is located in the north-western part of the Eure department, on the small river Calonne, which empties into the Touques. Cormeilles is part of the Pays d'Auge.

== Economy ==
The largest distillery of Calvados in Normandy is located in Cormeilles.

== International relations ==
Cormeilles is twinned with Chepstow, and has been since 1975. Cormeilles is also twinned with Decs in Hungary, and has been since 2001.

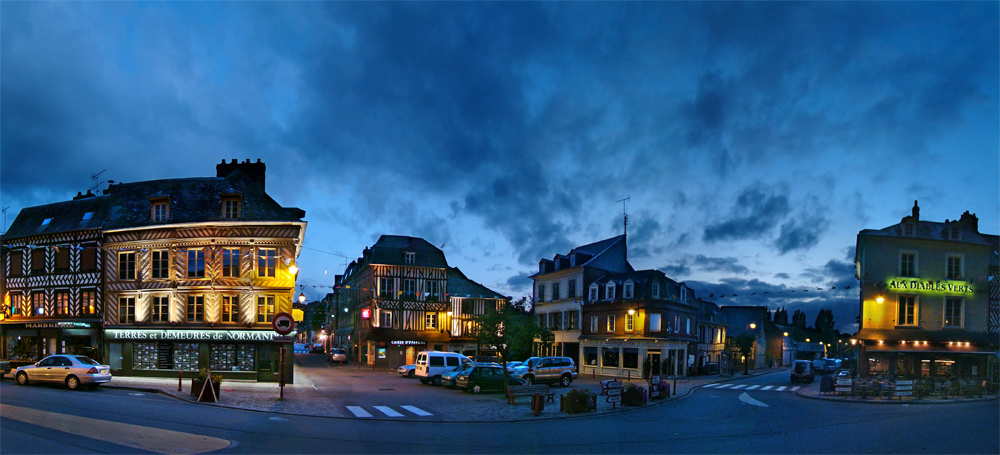

== See also ==
- Communes of the Eure department
